= Bohr–Einstein debates =

Series of public disputes between physicists Niels Bohr and Albert Einstein

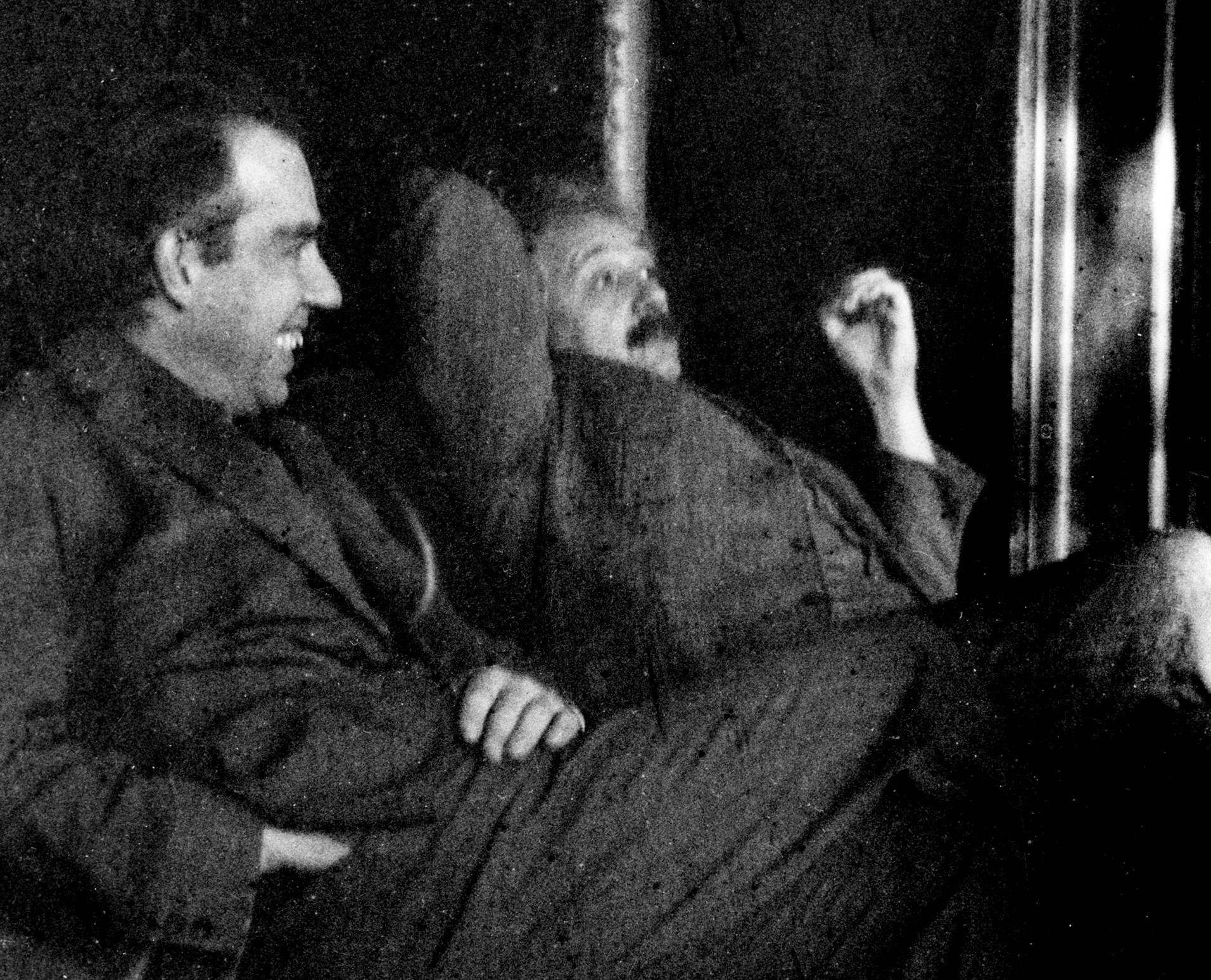
Niels Bohr (left) with Albert Einstein (right) at Paul Ehrenfest's home in Leiden (December 1925)

The Bohr–Einstein debates were a series of public disputes about quantum mechanics between Albert Einstein and Niels Bohr. Their debates are remembered because of their importance to the philosophy of science, insofar as the disagreements—and the outcome of Bohr's version of quantum mechanics becoming the prevalent view—form the root of the modern understanding of physics. Most of Bohr's version of the events held in the Solvay Conference in 1927 and other places was first written by Bohr decades later in an article titled, "Discussions with Einstein on Epistemological Problems in Atomic Physics". Based on the article, the philosophical issue of the debate was whether Bohr's Copenhagen interpretation of quantum mechanics, which centered on his belief of complementarity, was valid in explaining nature.

Despite their differences of opinion and the succeeding discoveries that helped solidify quantum mechanics, Bohr and Einstein maintained a mutual admiration that was to last the rest of their lives. They were friends all their lives and enjoyed using each other as a foil.

== Pre-revolutionary debates ==
Einstein was the first physicist to say that Max Planck's discovery of the energy quanta would require a rewriting of the laws of physics. To support his point, in 1905 Einstein proposed that light sometimes acts as a particle which he called a light quantum (see photon and wave–particle duality). Bohr was one of the most vocal opponents of the photon idea and did not openly embrace it until 1925. The photon appealed to Einstein because he saw it as a physical reality (although a confusing one) behind the numbers presented by Planck mathematically in 1900. Bohr disliked it because it made the choice of mathematical solution arbitrary; Bohr did not like a scientist having to choose between equations. This disagreement was perhaps the first real Bohr-Einstein debate. Einstein had proposed the photon in 1905, and Arthur Compton provided evidence in 1922 with his Compton effect. Bohr, along with Hans Kramers and John C. Slater asserted that conservation of energy only applied to statistical averages in the BKS theory of 1924. However, after the 1925 Bothe–Geiger coincidence experiment, BKS was proved to be wrong and Einstein's position that energy was conserved in individual collisions was shown to be correct.

== The quantum revolution ==
The quantum revolution of the mid-1920s occurred under the direction of both Einstein and Bohr, and their post-revolutionary debates were about making sense of the change. Erwin Schrödinger redeveloped quantum theory in terms of a wave mechanics formulation, leading to the Schrödinger equation. When Schrödinger sent a preprint of his new equation to Einstein, Einstein wrote back hailing his equation as a decisive advance of “true genius.” In parallel, Werner Heisenberg's 1925 Umdeutung paper reinterpreted old quantum theory in terms of matrix-like operators, removing the Newtonian elements of space and time from any underlying reality. A year later, in 1926, Max Born, collaborating with Heisenberg, proposed that mechanics were to be understood as a probability without any causal explanation.

Both Einstein and Schrödinger rejected Born's interpretation, with its renunciation of causality which had been a key feature of science still present in general relativity. In a 1926 letter to Max Born, Einstein wrote:

[...] quantum mechanics is certainly imposing. But an inner voice tells me that it is not yet the real thing. The theory says a lot, but does not really bring us any closer to the secret of the “old one”. I, at any rate, am convinced that He [God] is not playing at dice.

At first, even Heisenberg had heated disputes with Bohr about whether his matrix mechanics were compatible with Schrödinger's wave mechanics. And Bohr was opposed to Heisenberg's uncertainty principle. However, by the fifth Solvay Conference in October 1927, Heisenberg and Born concluded that the revolution was over and nothing further was needed. It was at that last stage that Einstein's skepticism turned to dismay. He believed that much had been accomplished, but the reasons behind the mechanics still needed to be understood.

Einstein's refusal to accept the revolution as complete reflected his desire to see developed a model for the underlying causes from which these apparent random statistical methods resulted. He did not reject the idea that positions in space-time could never be completely known but did not want to allow the uncertainty principle to necessitate a seemingly random, non-deterministic mechanism by which the laws of physics operated. Einstein himself was a statistical thinker but denied that no more needed to be discovered or clarified. Einstein worked the rest of his life to discover a new theory that would make sense of quantum mechanics and return causality to science, what many now call the theory of everything. Bohr, meanwhile, was dismayed by none of the elements that troubled Einstein. He made his own peace with the contradictions by proposing a principle of complementarity that assigns properties only as result of measurements.

== Post-revolution: First stage ==
As mentioned above, Einstein's position underwent significant modifications over the course of the years. In the first stage, Einstein refused to accept quantum indeterminism and sought to demonstrate that the uncertainty principle could be violated, suggesting ingenious thought experiments which should permit the accurate determination of incompatible variables, such as position and velocity, or to explicitly reveal simultaneously the wave and the particle aspects of the same process. (The main source and substance for these thought experiments is solely from Bohr's account twenty years later.) Bohr admits: “As regards the account of the conversations I am of course aware that I am relying only on my own memory, just as I am prepared for the possibility that many features of the development of quantum theory, in which Einstein has played so large a part, may appear to himself in a different light.”

=== Einstein's argument ===
The first serious attack by Einstein on the "orthodox" conception took place during the Fifth Solvay International Conference on "Electrons and Photons" in 1927. Einstein pointed out how it was possible to take advantage of the (universally accepted) laws of conservation of energy and of impulse (momentum) in order to obtain information on the state of a particle in a process of interference which, according to the principle of indeterminacy or that of complementarity, should not be accessible.

Figure A. A monochromatic beam (one for which all the particles have the same impulse) encounters a first screen, diffracts, and the diffracted wave encounters a second screen with two slits, resulting in the formation of an interference figure on the background F. As always, it is assumed that only one particle at a time is able to pass the entire mechanism. From the measure of the recoil of the screen S_{1}, according to Einstein, one can deduce from which slit the particle has passed without destroying the wave aspects of the process.

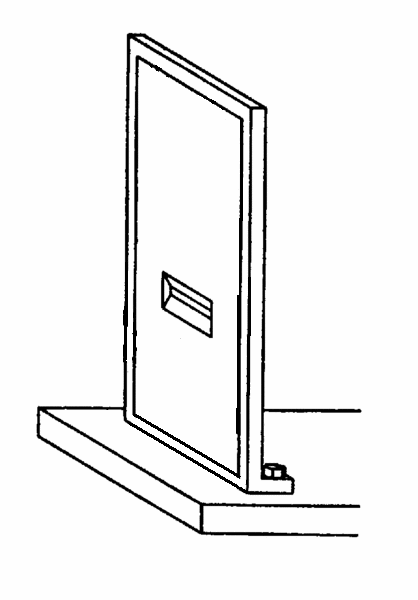
Figure B. Einstein's slit.

In order to follow his argumentation and to evaluate Bohr's response, it is convenient to refer to the experimental apparatus illustrated in figure A. A beam of light perpendicular to the X axis (here aligned vertically) propagates in the direction z and encounters a screen S_{1} with a narrow (relative to the wavelength of the ray) slit. After having passed through the slit, the wave function diffracts with an angular opening that causes it to encounter a second screen S_{2} with two slits. The successive propagation of the wave results in the formation of the interference figure on the final screen F.

At the passage through the two slits of the second screen S_{2}, the wave aspects of the process become essential. In fact, it is precisely the interference between the two terms of the quantum superposition corresponding to states in which the particle is localized in one of the two slits which produces zones of constructive and destructive interference (in which the wave function is nullified). It is also important to note that any experiment designed to evidence the "corpuscular" aspects of the process at the passage of the screen S_{2} (which, in this case, reduces to the determination of which slit the particle has passed through) inevitably destroys the wave aspects, implies the disappearance of the interference figure and the emergence of two concentrated spots of diffraction which confirm our knowledge of the trajectory followed by the particle.

At this point Einstein brings into play the first screen as well and argues as follows: since the incident particles have velocities (practically) perpendicular to the screen S_{1}, and since it is only the interaction with this screen that can cause a deflection from the original direction of propagation, by the law of conservation of impulse which implies that the sum of the impulses of two systems which interact is conserved, if the incident particle is deviated toward the top, the screen will recoil toward the bottom and vice versa. In realistic conditions the mass of the screen is so large that it will remain stationary, but, in principle, it is possible to measure even an infinitesimal recoil. If we imagine taking the measurement of the impulse of the screen in the direction X after every single particle has passed, we can know, from the fact that the screen will be found recoiled toward the top (bottom), whether the particle in question has been deviated toward the bottom or top, and therefore through which slit in S_{2} the particle has passed. But since the determination of the direction of the recoil of the screen after the particle has passed cannot influence the successive development of the process, we will still have an interference figure on the screen F. The interference takes place precisely because the state of the system is the superposition of two states whose wave functions are non-zero only near one of the two slits. On the other hand, if every particle passes through only the slit b or the slit c, then the set of systems is the statistical mixture of the two states, which means that interference is not possible. If Einstein is correct, then there is a violation of the principle of indeterminacy.

This thought experiment was begun in a simpler form during the general discussion portion of the actual proceedings during the 1927 Solvay conference. In those official proceedings, Bohr's reply is recorded as: “I feel myself in a very difficult position because I don’t understand precisely the point that Einstein is trying to make.” Einstein had explained, “it could happen that the same elementary process produces an action in two or several places on the screen. But the interpretation, according to which psi squared expresses the probability that this particular particle is found at a given point, assumes an entirely peculiar mechanism of action at a distance.” It is clear from this that Einstein was referring to separability (in particular, and most importantly local causality, i.e. locality), not indeterminacy. In fact, Paul Ehrenfest wrote a letter to Bohr stating that the 1927 thought experiments of Einstein had nothing to do with the uncertainty principle, as Einstein had already accepted these “and for a long time never doubted.”

=== Bohr's response ===
Bohr evidently misunderstood Einstein's argument about the quantum mechanical violation of relativistic causality (locality) and instead focused on the consistency of quantum indeterminacy. Bohr's response was to illustrate Einstein's idea more clearly using the diagram in Figure C. (Figure C shows a fixed screen S_{1} that is bolted down. Then try to imagine one that can slide up or down along a rod instead of a fixed bolt.) Bohr observes that extremely precise knowledge of any (potential) vertical motion of the screen is an essential presupposition in Einstein's argument. In fact, if its velocity in the direction X before the passage of the particle is not known with a precision substantially greater than that induced by the recoil (that is, if it were already moving vertically with an unknown and greater velocity than that which it derives as a consequence of the contact with the particle), then the determination of its motion after the passage of the particle would not give the information we seek. However, Bohr continues, an extremely precise determination of the velocity of the screen, when one applies the principle of indeterminacy, implies an inevitable imprecision of its position in the direction X. Before the process even begins, the screen would therefore occupy an indeterminate position at least to a certain extent (defined by the formalism). Now consider, for example, the point d in figure A, where the interference is destructive. Any displacement of the first screen would make the lengths of the two paths, a–b–d and a–c–d, different from those indicated in the figure. If the difference between the two paths varies by half a wavelength, at point d there will be constructive rather than destructive interference. The ideal experiment must average over all the possible positions of the screen S_{1}, and, for every position, there corresponds, for a certain fixed point F, a different type of interference, from the perfectly destructive to the perfectly constructive. The effect of this averaging is that the pattern of interference on the screen F will be uniformly grey. Once more, our attempt to evidence the corpuscular aspects in S_{2} has destroyed the possibility of interference in F, which depends crucially on the wave aspects.

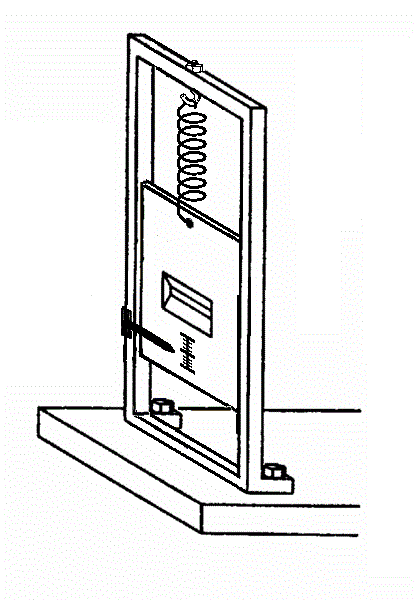
Figure C. In order to realize Einstein's proposal, it is necessary to replace the first screen in Figure A (S_{1}) with a diaphragm that can move vertically, such as this proposed by Bohr.

As Bohr recognized, for the understanding of this phenomenon "it is decisive that, contrary to genuine instruments of measurement, these bodies along with the particles would constitute, in the case under examination, the system to which the quantum-mechanical formalism must apply. With respect to the precision of the conditions under which one can correctly apply the formalism, it is essential to include the entire experimental apparatus. In fact, the introduction of any new apparatus, such as a mirror, in the path of a particle could introduce new effects of interference which influence essentially the predictions about the results which will be registered at the end." Further along, Bohr attempts to resolve this ambiguity concerning which parts of the system should be considered macroscopic and which not:

In particular, it must be very clear that...the unambiguous use of spatiotemporal concepts in the description of atomic phenomena must be limited to the registration of observations which refer to images on a photographic lens or to analogous practically irreversible effects of amplification such as the formation of a drop of water around an ion in a dark room.

Bohr's argument about the impossibility of using the apparatus proposed by Einstein to violate the principle of indeterminacy depends crucially on the fact that a macroscopic system (the screen S_{1}) obeys quantum laws. On the other hand, Bohr consistently held that, in order to illustrate the microscopic aspects of reality, it is necessary to set off a process of amplification, which involves macroscopic apparatuses, whose fundamental characteristic is that of obeying classical laws and which can be described in classical terms. This ambiguity would later come back in the form of what is still called today the measurement problem.

However, Bohr in his article refuting the EPR paper, states “there is no question of a mechanical disturbance of the system under investigation.” Heisenberg quotes Bohr as saying, “I find all such assertions as ‘observation introduces uncertainty into the phenomenon’ inaccurate and misleading.” Manjit Kumar's book on the Bohr–Einstein debates finds these assertions by Bohr contrary to his arguments. Others, such as the physicist Leon Rosenfeld, did find Bohr's argument convincing.

=== Uncertainty principle applied to time and energy ===
Figure D. A wave extended longitudinally passes through a slit which remains open only for a brief interval of time. Beyond the slit, there is a spatially limited wave in the direction of propagation.

In many textbook examples and popular discussions of quantum mechanics, the principle of indeterminacy is explained by reference to the pair of variables position and velocity (or momentum). The wave nature of physical processes implies that there must exist another relation of indeterminacy: that between time and energy. In order to comprehend this relation, it is convenient to refer to the experiment illustrated in Figure D, which results in the propagation of a wave which is limited in spatial extension. Assume that, as illustrated in the figure, a ray which is extremely extended longitudinally is propagated toward a screen with a slit furnished with a shutter which remains open only for a very brief interval of time $\Delta t$. Beyond the slit, there will be a wave of limited spatial extension which continues to propagate toward the right.

A perfectly monochromatic wave (such as a musical note which cannot be divided into harmonics) has infinite spatial extent. In order to have a wave which is limited in spatial extension (which is technically called a wave packet), several waves of different frequencies must be superimposed and distributed continuously within a certain interval of frequencies around an average value, such as $\nu_0$. It then happens that at a certain instant, there exists a spatial region (which moves over time) in which the contributions of the various fields of the superposition add up constructively. Nonetheless, according to a precise mathematical theorem, as we move far away from this region, the phases of the various fields, at any specified point, are distributed causally and destructive interference is produced. The region in which the wave has non-zero amplitude is therefore spatially limited. It is easy to demonstrate that, if the wave has a spatial extension equal to $\Delta x$ (which means, in our example, that the shutter has remained open for a time $\Delta t = \Delta x/v$ where v is the velocity of the wave), then the wave contains (or is a superposition of) various monochromatic waves whose frequencies cover an interval $\Delta \nu$ which satisfies the relation:

$$\Delta \nu \ge \frac{1}{\Delta t}.$$

Remembering that in the Planck relation, frequency and energy are proportional:

$$E = h\nu \,$$

it follows immediately from the preceding inequality that the particle associated with the wave should possess an energy which is not perfectly defined (since different frequencies are involved in the superposition) and consequently there is indeterminacy in energy:

$$\Delta E = h\,\Delta\nu \ge \frac{h}{\Delta t}.$$

From this it follows immediately that:

$$\Delta E \, \Delta t \ge h$$

which is the relation of indeterminacy between time and energy.

=== Einstein's second criticism ===
Einstein's thought experiment of 1930 as designed by Bohr. Einstein's box was supposed to prove the violation of the indeterminacy relation between time and energy.

At the sixth Congress of Solvay in 1930, the indeterminacy relation just discussed was Einstein's target of criticism. His idea contemplates the existence of an experimental apparatus which was subsequently designed by Bohr in such a way as to emphasize the essential elements and the key points which he would use in his response.

Einstein considers a box (called Einstein's box, or Einstein's light box; see figure) containing electromagnetic radiation and a clock which controls the opening of a shutter which covers a hole made in one of the walls of the box. The shutter uncovers the hole for a time $\Delta t$ which can be chosen arbitrarily. During the opening, we are to suppose that a photon, from among those inside the box, escapes through the hole. In this way a wave of limited spatial extension has been created, following the explanation given above. In order to challenge the indeterminacy relation between time and energy, it is necessary to find a way to determine with adequate precision the energy that the photon has brought with it. At this point, Einstein turns to mass–energy equivalence of special relativity: $E=mc^2$. From this it follows that knowledge of the mass of an object provides a precise indication about its energy. The argument is therefore very simple: if one weighs the box before and after the opening of the shutter and if a certain amount of energy has escaped from the box, the box will be lighter. The variation in mass multiplied by $c^2$ will provide precise knowledge of the energy emitted. Moreover, the clock will indicate the precise time at which the event of the particle's emission took place. Since, in principle, the mass of the box can be determined to an arbitrary degree of accuracy, the energy emitted can be determined with a precision $\Delta E$ as accurate as one desires. Therefore, the product $\Delta E \Delta t$ can be rendered less than what is implied by the principle of indeterminacy.

George Gamow's make-believe experimental apparatus for validating the thought experiment at the Niels Bohr Institute in Copenhagen

The idea is particularly acute and the argument seemed unassailable. It's important to consider the impact of all of these exchanges on the people involved at the time. Leon Rosenfeld, who had participated in the Congress, described the event several years later:

It was a real shock for Bohr...who, at first, could not think of a solution. For the entire evening he was extremely agitated, and he continued passing from one scientist to another, seeking to persuade them that it could not be the case, that it would have been the end of physics if Einstein were right; but he couldn't come up with any way to resolve the paradox. I will never forget the image of the two antagonists as they left the club: Einstein, with his tall and commanding figure, who walked tranquilly, with a mildly ironic smile, and Bohr who trotted along beside him, full of excitement...The morning after saw the triumph of Bohr.

=== Bohr's triumph ===
The triumph of Bohr consisted in his demonstrating, once again, that Einstein's subtle argument was not conclusive, but even more so in the way that he arrived at this conclusion by appealing precisely to one of the great ideas of Einstein: the principle of equivalence between gravitational mass and inertial mass, together with the time dilation of special relativity, and a consequence of these—the gravitational redshift. Bohr showed that, in order for Einstein's experiment to function, the box would have to be suspended on a spring in the middle of a gravitational field. In order to obtain a measurement of the weight of the box, a pointer would have to be attached to the box which corresponded with the index on a scale. After the release of a photon, a mass $m$ could be added to the box to restore it to its original position and this would allow us to determine the energy $E = mc^2$ that was lost when the photon left. The box is immersed in a gravitational field of strength $g$, and the gravitational redshift affects the speed of the clock, yielding uncertainty $\Delta t$ in the time $t$ required for the pointer to return to its original position. Bohr gave the following calculation establishing the uncertainty relation $\Delta E \Delta t \ge h$.

Let the uncertainty in the mass $m$ be denoted by $\Delta m$. Let the error in the position of the pointer be $\Delta q$. Adding the load $m$ to the box imparts a momentum $p$ that we can measure with an accuracy $\Delta p$, where $\Delta p \Delta q$ ≈ $h$. Clearly $\Delta p \le tg\Delta m$, and therefore $tg\Delta m\Delta q \ge h$. By the redshift formula (which follows from the principle of equivalence and the time dilation), the uncertainty in the time $t$ is $\Delta t = c^{-2} gt\Delta q$, and $\Delta E = c^2\Delta m$, and so $\Delta E \Delta t = c^2\Delta m \Delta t \ge h$. We have therefore proven the claimed $\Delta E\Delta t \ge h$.

More recent analyses of the photon box debate questions Bohr's understanding of Einstein's thought experiment, referring instead to a prelude to the EPR paper, focusing on inseparability rather than indeterminism being at issue.

== Post-revolution: Second stage ==
The second phase of Einstein's "debate" with Bohr and the orthodox interpretation is characterized by an acceptance of the fact that it is, as a practical matter, impossible to simultaneously determine the values of certain incompatible quantities, but the rejection that this implies that these quantities do not actually have precise values. Einstein rejects the probabilistic interpretation of Born and insists that quantum probabilities are epistemic and not ontological in nature. As a consequence, the theory must be incomplete in some way. He recognizes the great value of the theory, but suggests that it "does not tell the whole story", and, while providing an appropriate description at a certain level, it gives no information on the more fundamental underlying level:

I have the greatest consideration for the goals which are pursued by the physicists of the latest generation which go under the name of quantum mechanics, and I believe that this theory represents a profound level of truth, but I also believe that the restriction to laws of a statistical nature will turn out to be transitory....Without doubt quantum mechanics has grasped an important fragment of the truth and will be a paragon for all future fundamental theories, for the fact that it must be deducible as a limiting case from such foundations, just as electrostatics is deducible from Maxwell's equations of the electromagnetic field or as thermodynamics is deducible from statistical mechanics.

These thoughts of Einstein would set off a line of research into hidden variable theories, such as the Bohm interpretation, in an attempt to complete the edifice of quantum theory. If quantum mechanics can be made complete in Einstein's sense, it cannot be done locally; this fact was demonstrated by John Stewart Bell with the formulation of Bell's inequality in 1964. Although, the Bell inequality ruled out local hidden variable theories, Bohm's theory was not ruled out. A 2007 experiment ruled out a large class of non-Bohmian non-local hidden variable theories, though not Bohmian mechanics itself.

== Post-revolution: Third stage ==
=== The argument of EPR ===
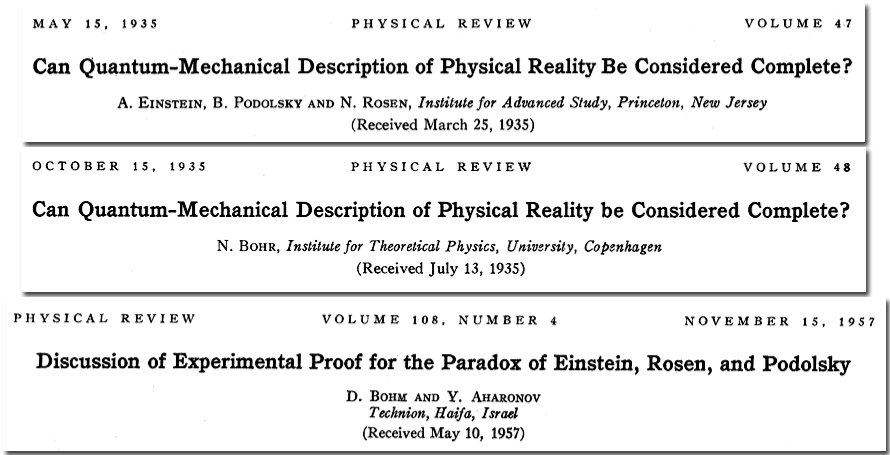
Title sections of historical papers on EPR

In 1935 Einstein, Boris Podolsky and Nathan Rosen developed an argument, published in the magazine Physical Review with the title Can Quantum-Mechanical Description of Physical Reality Be Considered Complete?, based on an entangled state of two systems. Before coming to this argument, it is necessary to formulate another hypothesis that comes out of Einstein's work in relativity: the principle of locality. The elements of physical reality which are objectively possessed cannot be influenced instantaneously at a distance.

David Bohm picked up the EPR argument in 1951. In his textbook Quantum Theory, he reformulated it in terms of an entangled state of two particles, which can be summarized as follows:

1) Consider a system of two photons which at time t are located, respectively, in the spatially distant regions A and B and which are also in the entangled state of polarization $\left|\Psi\right\rang$ described below:

$$\left|\Psi,t\right\rang = \frac1{\sqrt{2}}\left|1,V\right\rang \left|2,V\right\rang + \frac1{\sqrt{2}}\left|1,H\right\rang \left|2,H\right\rang.$$

2) At time t the photon in region A is tested for vertical polarization. Suppose that the result of the measurement is that the photon passes through the filter. According to the reduction of the wave packet, the result is that, at time t + dt, the system becomes

$$\left|\Psi,t+dt\right\rang = \left|1,V\right\rang \left|2,V\right\rang.$$

3) At this point, the observer in A who carried out the first measurement on photon 1, without doing anything else that could disturb the system or the other photon ("assumption (R)", below), can predict with certainty that photon 2 will pass a test of vertical polarization. It follows that photon 2 possesses an element of physical reality: that of having a vertical polarization.

4) According to the assumption of locality, it cannot have been the action carried out in A which created this element of reality for photon 2. Therefore, we must conclude that the photon possessed the property of being able to pass the vertical polarization test before and independently of the measurement of photon 1.

5) At time t, the observer in A could have decided to carry out a test of polarization at 45°, obtaining a certain result, for example, that the photon passes the test. In that case, he could have concluded that photon 2 turned out to be polarized at 45°. Alternatively, if the photon did not pass the test, he could have concluded that photon 2 turned out to be polarized at 135°. Combining one of these alternatives with the conclusion reached in 4, it seems that photon 2, before the measurement took place, possessed both the property of being able to pass with certainty a test of vertical polarization and the property of being able to pass with certainty a test of polarization at either 45° or 135°. These properties are incompatible according to the formalism.

6) Since natural and obvious requirements have forced the conclusion that photon 2 simultaneously possesses incompatible properties, this means that, even if it is not possible to determine these properties simultaneously and with arbitrary precision, they are nevertheless possessed objectively by the system. But quantum mechanics denies this possibility and it is therefore an incomplete theory.

=== Bohr's response ===
Bohr's response to this argument was published, five months later than the original publication of EPR, in the same magazine Physical Review and with exactly the same title as the original. The crucial point of Bohr's answer is distilled in a passage which he later had republished in Paul Arthur Schilpp's book Albert Einstein, scientist-philosopher in honor of the seventieth birthday of Einstein. Bohr attacks assumption (R) of EPR by stating:

The statement of the criterion in question is ambiguous with regard to the expression "without disturbing the system in any way". Naturally, in this case no mechanical disturbance of the system under examination can take place in the crucial stage of the process of measurement. But even in this stage there arises the essential problem of an influence on the precise conditions which define the possible types of prediction which regard the subsequent behaviour of the system...their arguments do not justify their conclusion that the quantum description turns out to be essentially incomplete...This description can be characterized as a rational use of the possibilities of an unambiguous interpretation of the process of measurement compatible with the finite and uncontrollable interaction between the object and the instrument of measurement in the context of quantum theory.

Bohr's presentation of his argument was hard to follow for many of the scientists (although his views were generally accepted). Rosenfeld, who had worked closely with Bohr for many years, later explains Bohr's argument in a way that is perhaps more accessible:

In the case of the two particles, it is true that the measurement carried out on the first particle does not cause any direct physical disturbance of the second; but the measurement decisively affects the nature of verifiable predictions we will be able to make about this second particle. (...) [A]s long as we do not carry out any measurement (...) we have no control at all over this correlation [between the two particles]. If we really want the system to be subject to study and communication, we must carry out some measurement. If we now observe the position of the first particle, the correlation between the positions of the particles can be used to give us information about where the second particle is, but we have no way of making use of the correlation between the pulses of the particles (...). If we observe the momentum of the first particle, it is just the opposite. We retain control over the momentum correlation, but lose it over the position correlation. The two different measurements define two complementary phenomena that can never be reconciled into a single description of the given two-particle system.

=== Confirmatory experiments ===
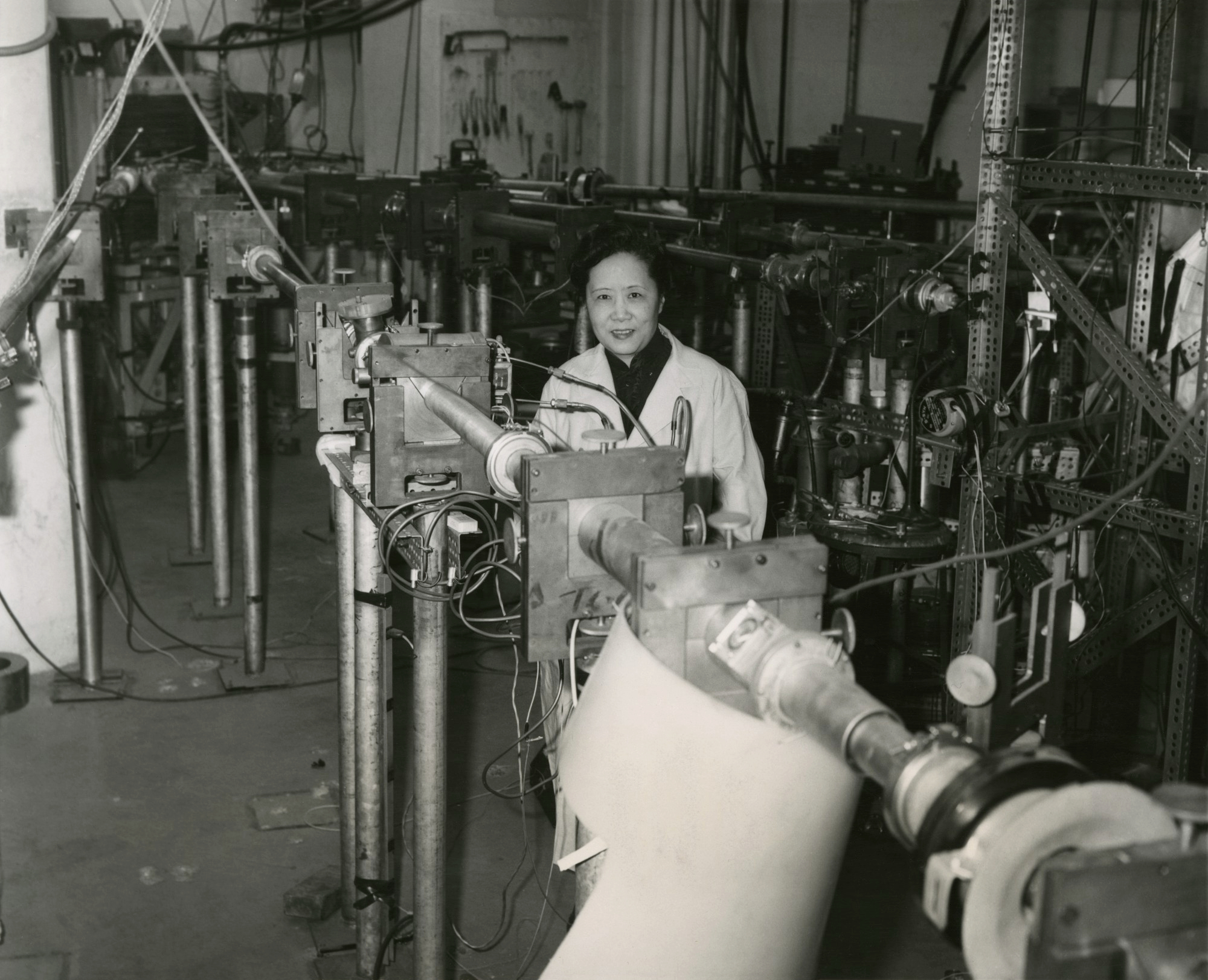
Chien-Shiung Wu

Years after the exposition of Einstein via his EPR experiment, many physicists started performing experiments to show that Einstein's view of a spooky action in a distance is indeed consistent with the laws of physics. The first experiment to definitively prove that this was the case was in 1949, when physicists Chien-Shiung Wu and her colleague Irving Shaknov showcased this theory in real time using photons. Their work was published in the new year of the succeeding decade.

Later in 1975, Alain Aspect proposed in an article, an experiment meticulous enough to be irrefutable: Proposed experiment to test the non-separability of quantum mechanics. This led Aspect, together with his assistant Gérard Roger, and Jean Dalibard and Philippe Grangier (two young physics students at the time) to set up several increasingly complex experiments between 1980 and 1982 that further established quantum entanglement. Finally in 1998, the Geneva experiment tested the correlation between two detectors set 30 kilometres apart, virtually across the whole city, using the Swiss optical fibre telecommunication network. The distance gave the necessary time to commute the angles of the polarizers. It was therefore possible to have a completely random electrical shunting. Furthermore, the two distant polarizers were entirely independent. The measurements were recorded on each side, and compared after each experiment by dating each measurement using an atomic clock. The experiment once again verified entanglement under the strictest and most ideal conditions possible. If Aspect's experiment implied that a hypothetical coordination signal travel twice as fast as c, Geneva's reached 10 million times c.

== Post-revolution: Fourth stage ==
In his last writing on the topic, Einstein further refined his position, making it completely clear that what really disturbed him about the quantum theory was the problem of the total renunciation of all minimal standards of realism, even at the microscopic level, that the acceptance of the completeness of the theory implied. Since the early days of quantum theory the assumption of locality and Lorentz invariance guided his thoughts and led to his determination that if we demand strict locality then hidden variables are naturally implied apropos EPR. Bell, starting from this EPR logic (which is widely misunderstood or forgotten) showed that local hidden variables imply a conflict with experiment. In an interview in the 1970s, Bell summarized his view of the decades long debates:

Bohr was inconsistent, unclear, willfully obscure and right. Einstein was consistent, clear, down-to-earth and wrong.

Ultimately what was at stake for Einstein was the assumption that physical reality be universally local. Although the majority of experts in the field agree that Einstein was wrong, the current understanding is still not complete (see Interpretation of quantum mechanics).

== See also ==
- Bell test experiments
- Bell's theorem
- Complementarity
- Copenhagen interpretation
- Double-slit experiment
- Einstein's thought experiments
- Invariant set postulate
- Quantum eraser
- Schrödinger's cat
- Uncertainty principle
- Wheeler's delayed choice experiment
- Superdeterminism
