= List of things named after Niels Bohr =

Niels Bohr (1885–1962), Danish physicist who made foundational contributions to understanding atomic structure and quantum theory, is the eponym of the topics listed below.

== Physics and Chemistry ==
- Bohr magneton
- Bohr model
  - Bohr model of the chemical bond
  - Bohr orbital
  - Bohr radius
  - Bohr's frequency condition
- Bohrium, the chemical element with atomic number 107
- Bohr–Van Leeuwen theorem
- Bohr–Kramers–Slater theory
- Bohr–Einstein debates
- Sommerfeld–Bohr theory
  - Bohr–Sommerfeld quantization
- Bohr's complementarity principle
- Bohr's correspondence principle

== Psychophysics ==
- Bohr's law

== Astronomy ==
- An asteroid, 3948 Bohr, named after him
- Bohr (crater), a lunar crater

== Other ==
- Niels Bohr Institute in Copenhagen
- Niels Bohr International Gold Medal
- Neil's Bahr, a popular comic and science-fiction based bar in Houston, Texas
- At the CERN site in Meyrin, close to Geneva, there is a street called Route Bohr and an auditorium called Salle Bohr in honour of Niels Bohr
- Niels Bohr Library & Archives of American Institute of Physics
- Cenotaph for Niels Bohr, a conceptual architecture project
- UNESCO Niels Bohr Medal
