= Bothe–Geiger coincidence experiment =

Experiment in quantum physics

In the history of quantum mechanics, the Bothe–Geiger coincidence experiment was conducted by Walther Bothe and Hans Geiger from 1924 to 1925. The experiment explored x-ray scattering from electrons to determine the nature of the conservation of energy at microscopic scales, which was contested at that time. The experiment confirmed existence of photons, the conservation of energy and the Compton scattering theory.

At that time, quantum mechanics was still under development in what was known as the old quantum theory. Under this framework, the BKS theory by Niels Bohr, Hendrik Kramers, and John C. Slater proposed the possibility that energy conservation is only true for large statistical ensembles and could be violated for small quantum systems. BKS theory also argued against the quantum nature of light. The Bothe–Geiger experiments helped disprove BKS theory, marking an end to old quantum theory, and inspiring the re-interpretation of the theory in terms of matrix mechanics by Werner Heisenberg.

The experiment used for the first time a coincidence method, thanks to the coincidence circuit developed by Bothe, who received the Nobel Prize in Physics in 1954 for this development and successive experiments using this method.

== Motivation ==
Compton effect. Incident photon (with wavelength λ) hits an electron in a target. This produces a scattered photon (with wavelength λ' > λ) and a recoil electron.

In 1923, Arthur Compton had shown experimentally that x-rays were scattered elastically by free electrons, in accordance to the conservation of energy. The scattered photon had a lower frequency than the incoming photon, according to the Planck–Einstein relation for the energy E = ℏω (ℏ is the reduced Planck constant, and ω is the angular frequency), while the remaining energy was transmitted to the recoil electron.

This discovery started a debate between those that believed that the energy was always conserved, like Compton, Albert Einstein and Wolfgang Pauli, and those who believed it was only statistically valid. Bohr, Kramers and Slater published their BKS theory in February 1924 in Zeitschrift für Physik, arguing against energy conservation in individual atomic scattering events. They also considered that light could be treated classically without the need of the light quanta hypothesis of Einstein.

After finishing his doctoral degree under the supervision of Max Planck in 1913, Walther Bothe joined the radioactivity group in the Physikalisch-Technische Reichsanstalt in Charlottenburg, Berlin, to work with Hans Geiger, at that time head of the lab. Bothe studied Compton scattering with x-rays using a cloud chamber filled with hydrogen.

Shortly after the publication of the BKS theory, Bothe and Geiger announced in the same journal an experiment proposal to test BKS theory.

Werner Heisenberg remained agnostic with respect to BKS theory. In a letter to Arnold Sommerfeld, he wrote:

For the rest I believe more and more that the question "photons or correspondence principle" is a question of semantics. All effects in quantum theory must after all have a classical counterpart, for the classical theory is almost correct; thus all effects must have two names, a classical and a quantum [name]. Which one prefers is really a matter of taste. Perhaps the Bohr radiation theory is a very happy description of this dualism; I am anxiously awaiting the results of the Bothe–Geiger experiment.

== Experiment ==
According to Compton scattering, if an incident photon hits an electron, the recoil electron and the scattered photon would fly in opposite directions in the direction perpendicular to the trajectory of the incident photon.

For the experiment, a collimated x-ray beam was directed to a scattering material in a gap between two counters. The electron counter and a photon counter were placed in the line perpendicular to the beam, on opposite sides. Due to the minimal energy of the recoil electron, the electron detection essentially occurs at their scattering site. Thus the scattering volume must be situated within the electron counter. The whole setup was enclosed in a glass sphere filled with hydrogen at atmospheric pressure.

In Bothe–Geiger experiment, Geiger needle counters covered with thin platinum foil were used to detect scattered photons. A fraction of the photons produced a measurable electric current due to the photoelectric effect. The count detections were recorded photographically using silver bromide film, by the means of a string electrometers. The efficiency of the coincidence counting was of the order of 1 for 10 events. Bothe and Geiger observed 66 coincidences in 5 hours, of which 46 were attributed to false counts, with a statistical fluctuation of 1 in 400000.

The measurements and data treatment took over a year. The overall experiment produced more than three kilometers of the just 1.5-centimeter-wide film that had to be analyzed manually. According to Bothe, the "film consumption, however, was so enormous that our laboratory with the film strips strung up for drying sometimes resembled an industrial laundry".

Any delay between the detection of the photon and the electron would be a hint of a violation of the conservation of energy. However, a simultaneous detection indicated a confirmation of Compton's theory.

== Results, reception and legacy ==
In April 1925, Bothe and Geiger reported that the photon and electron counters responded simultaneously, with a time resolution of 1 millisecond. Their result confirmed the quantum nature of light and was the first evidence against BKS theory. They argued: "Our results are not in accord with Bohr's interpretation of the Compton effect ... it is recommended therefore to retain until further notice the picture of Compton and [Peter] Debye. ... One must therefore probably assume that the light quantum concept possesses a high degree of validity as assumed in that theory."

Published in September of the same year, an experiment carried in parallel by Compton and Alfred W. Simon using a different technique, reached similar conclusions. The Compton–Simon experiment used cloud chamber techniques to track two different types of tracks: tracks of the recoil electron and tracks of the photoelectrons. Compton and Simon confirmed the relative angles between the tracks predicted by Compton scattering. Compton and Simon wrote: "the results do not appear to be reconcilable with the view of the statistical production of recoil and photo-electrons by Bohr, Kramers and Slater. They are, on the other hand, in direct support of the view that energy and momentum are conserved during the interaction between radiation and individual electrons."

The Bothe–Geiger experiment and the Compton–Simon experiment marked an end to the BKS theory. Kramers was skeptic at the beginning. In a letter to Bohr, Kramers said: "I can unfortunately not survey how convincing the experiments of Bothe and Geiger actually are for the case of the Compton effect". However, Bohr finished by accepting the results; in a letter to Ralph H. Fowler he wrote: "there is nothing else to do than to give our revolutionary efforts as honourable a funeral as possible".

Compton congratulated Bothe and Geiger for their results. Max von Laue said that "Physics was saved from being led astray". Science philosopher Karl Popper catalogued the result as an experimentum crucis.

In 1925, after the experiment, Bothe succeeded Geiger as the director of the lab.

The same year, Heisenberg would start to develop a new reinterpretation of quantum mechanics in his Umdeutung paper in 1925. In his 1927 paper on the uncertainty principle, he opposes the statistical interpretation of quantum mechanics, citing the Bothe–Geiger paper. Heisenberg wrote to Pauli: "I argue with Bohr over the extent to which the relation p_{1}q_{1} ~ h has its origin in the wave – or the discontinuity aspect of quantum mechanics. Bohr emphasizes that in the gamma-ray microscope the diffraction of the waves is essential; I emphasize that the theory of light quanta and even the Geiger–Bothe experiments are essential."

Almost a decade later, Robert S. Shankland performed an experiment that allegedly showed some inconsistencies with photon scattering, resurfacing the idea of BKS theory. However, it was later (1950) disproved by Robert Hofstadter and John A. Mcintyre with an experiment similar to the Bothe–Geiger experiment reducing the time resolution to 15 nanoseconds.

Further experiments were carried out by Bothe using his coincidence method. Geiger and Walther Müller further developed the Geiger–Müller tubes, that were used by Bothe and Werner Kolhörster experiment in 1929 to show that fast electrons detected in cloud chambers came from cosmic rays. In 1954, the Nobel Prize in Physics was split in two: half for Max Born for "his fundamental research in quantum mechanics, especially for his statistical interpretation of the wavefunction" and the other half for Bothe for "the coincidence method and his discoveries made therewith". Geiger had already died in 1945, so he was not eligible for a share of the prize.
