= Correspondence principle =

Physics principle formulated by Niels Bohr

In physics, a correspondence principle is any one of several premises or assertions about the relationship between classical and quantum mechanics. The physicist Niels Bohr coined the term in 1920 during the early development of quantum theory; he used it to explain how quantized classical orbitals connect to quantum radiation. Modern sources often use the term for the idea that the behavior of systems described by quantum theory reproduces classical physics in the limit of large quantum numbers: for large orbits and for large energies, quantum calculations must agree with classical calculations. A "generalized" correspondence principle refers to the requirement for a broad set of connections between any old and new theory.

== History ==
Max Planck was the first to introduce the idea of quanta of energy, while studying black-body radiation in 1900. In 1906, he was also the first to write that quantum theory should replicate classical mechanics at some limit, particularly if the Planck constant h were taken to be infinitesimal. With this idea, he showed that Planck's law for thermal radiation leads to the Rayleigh–Jeans law, the classical prediction (valid for large wavelength).

Niels Bohr used a similar idea, while developing his model of the atom. In 1913, he provided the first postulates of what is now known as old quantum theory. Using these postulates he obtained that for the hydrogen atom, the energy spectrum approaches the classical continuum for large n (a quantum number that encodes the energy of the orbit). Bohr coined the term "correspondence principle" during a lecture in 1920.

Arnold Sommerfeld refined Bohr's theory leading to the Bohr–Sommerfeld quantization condition. Sommerfeld referred to the correspondence principle as Bohr's magic wand (German: Bohrs Zauberstab), in 1921.

=== Bohr's correspondence principle ===
The seeds of Bohr's correspondence principle appeared from two sources. First Sommerfeld and Max Born developed a "quantization procedure" based on the action angle variables of classical Hamiltonian mechanics. This gave a mathematical foundation for stationary states of the Bohr–Sommerfeld model of the atom. The second seed was Albert Einstein's quantum derivation of Planck's law in 1916. Einstein developed the statistical mechanics for Bohr-model atoms interacting with electromagnetic radiation, leading to absorption and two kinds of emission, spontaneous and stimulated emission. But for Bohr the important result was the use of classical analogies and the Bohr atomic model to fix inconsistencies in Planck's derivation of the blackbody radiation formula.

Bohr used the word "correspondence" in italics in lectures and writing before calling it a correspondence principle. He viewed this as a correspondence between quantum motion and radiation, not between classical and quantum theories. He writes in 1920 that there exists "a far-reaching correspondence between the various types of possible transitions between the stationary states on the one hand and the various harmonic components of the motion on the other hand."

Bohr's first article containing the definition of the correspondence principle was in 1923, in a summary paper entitled (in the English translation) "On the application of quantum theory to atomic structure". In his chapter II, "The process of radiation", he defines his correspondence principle as a condition connecting harmonic components of the electron moment to the possible occurrence of a radiative transition. In modern terms, this condition is a selection rule, saying that a given quantum jump is possible if and only if a particular type of motion exists in the corresponding classical model.

Following his definition of the correspondence principle, Bohr describes two applications. First he shows that the frequency of emitted radiation is related to an integral which can be well approximated by a sum when the quantum numbers inside the integral are large compared with their differences. Similarly he shows a relationship for the intensities of spectral lines and thus the rates at which quantum jumps occur. These asymptotic relationships are expressed by Bohr as consequences of his general correspondence principle. However, historically each of these applications have been called "the correspondence principle".

The PhD dissertation of Hans Kramers working in Bohr's group in Copenhagen applied Bohr's correspondence principle to account for all of the known facts of the spectroscopic Stark effect, including some spectral components not known at the time of Kramers work. Sommerfeld had been skeptical of the correspondence principle as it did not seem to be a consequence of a fundamental theory; Kramers' work convinced him that the principle had heuristic utility nevertheless. Other physicists picked up the concept, including work by John Van Vleck and by Kramers and Heisenberg on dispersion theory. The principle became a cornerstone of the semi-classical Bohr-Sommerfeld atomic theory; Bohr's 1922 Nobel prize was partly awarded for his work with the correspondence principle.

Despite the successes, the physical theories based on the principle faced increasing challenges in the early 1920s. Theoretical calculations by Van Vleck and by Kramers of the ionization potential of Helium disagreed significantly with experimental values. Bohr, Kramers, and John C. Slater responded with a new theoretical approach now called the BKS theory based on the correspondence principle but disavowing conservation of energy. Einstein and Wolfgang Pauli criticized the new approach, and the Bothe–Geiger coincidence experiment showed that energy was conserved in quantum collisions.

With the existing theories in conflict with observations, two new quantum mechanics concepts arose. First, Heisenberg's 1925 Umdeutung paper on matrix mechanics was inspired by the correspondence principle, although he did not cite Bohr. Further development in collaboration with Pascual Jordan and Max Born resulted in a mathematical model without connection to the principle. Second, Schrodinger's wave mechanics in the following year similarly did not use the principle. Both pictures were later shown to be equivalent and accurate enough to replace old quantum theory. These approaches have no atomic orbits: the correspondence is more of an analogy than a principle.

=== Dirac's correspondence ===
Paul Dirac developed significant portions of the new quantum theory in the second half of the 1920s. While he did not apply Bohr's correspondence principle, he developed a different, more formal classical–quantum correspondence. Dirac connected the structures of classical mechanics known as Poisson brackets to analogous structures of quantum mechanics known as commutators:
$$\{A, B\} \longmapsto \frac{1}{i \hbar} [\hat{A}, \hat{B}].$$
By this correspondence, now called canonical quantization, Dirac showed how the mathematical form of classical mechanics could be recast as a basis for the new mathematics of quantum mechanics.

Dirac developed these connections by studying the work of Heisenberg and Kramers on dispersion, work that was directly built on Bohr's correspondence principle; the Dirac approach provides a mathematically sound path towards Bohr's goal of a connection between classical and quantum mechanics. While Dirac did not call this correspondence a "principle", physics textbooks refer to his connections a "correspondence principle".

=== The classical limit of wave mechanics ===
The outstanding success of classical mechanics in the description of natural phenomena up to the 20th century means that quantum mechanics must do as well in similar circumstances.

Judged by the test of experience, the laws of classical physics have brilliantly justified themselves in all processes of motion… It must therefore be laid down as an unconditionally necessary postulate, that the new mechanics … must in all these problems reach the same results as the classical mechanics.

— Max Born, 1933

One way to quantitatively define this concept is to require quantum mechanical theories to produce classical mechanics results as the quantum of action goes to zero, $\hbar \rightarrow 0$. This transition can be accomplished in two different ways.

First, the particle can be approximated by a wave packet, and the indefinite spread of the packet with time can be ignored. In 1927, Paul Ehrenfest proved his namesake theorem that showed that Newton's laws of motion hold on average in quantum mechanics: the quantum statistical expectation value of the position and momentum obey Newton's laws.

Second, the individual particle view can be replaced with a statistical mixture of classical particles with a density matching the quantum probability density. This approach led to the concept of semiclassical physics, beginning with the development of WKB approximation used in descriptions of quantum tunneling for example.

== Modern view ==
While Bohr viewed "correspondence" as a principle aiding his description of quantum phenomena, fundamental differences between the mathematical structure of quantum and of classical mechanics prevents correspondence in many cases. Rather than a principle, "there may be in some situations an approximate correspondence between classical and quantum concepts," physicist Asher Peres put it. Since quantum mechanics operates in a discrete space and classical mechanics in a continuous one, any correspondence will be necessarily fuzzy and elusive.

Introductory quantum mechanics textbooks suggest that quantum mechanics goes over to classical theory in the limit of high quantum numbers or in a limit where the Planck constant in the quantum formula is reduced to zero, $\hbar \rightarrow 0$. However such correspondence is not always possible. For example, classical systems can exhibit chaotic orbits which diverge but quantum states are unitary and maintain a fixed overlap.

=== Generalized correspondence principle ===
The term "generalized correspondence principle" has been used in the study of the history of science to mean the reduction of a new scientific theory to an earlier scientific theory in appropriate circumstances. This requires that the new theory explain all the phenomena under circumstances for which the preceding theory was known to be valid; it also means that new theory will retain large parts of the older theory. The generalized principle applies correspondence across aspects of a complete theory, not just a single formula as in the classical limit correspondence. For example, Albert Einstein in his 1905 work on relativity noted that classical mechanics relied on Galilean relativity while electromagnetism did not, and yet both work well. He produced a new theory that combined them in a way that reduced to these separate theories in approximations. Ironically the singular failure of this "generalized correspondence principle" concept of scientific theories is the replacement of classical mechanics with quantum mechanics.

== See also ==
- Quantum decoherence
- Classical limit
- Classical probability density
- Leggett–Garg inequality
