= Bethe–Slater curve =

Bethe–Slater curve: elements above the horizontal axis are ferromagnetic, and those below are antiferromagnetic

The Bethe–Slater curve is a heuristic explanation for why certain metals are ferromagnetic and others are antiferromagnetic. It assumes a Heisenberg model of magnetism, and explains the differences in exchange energy of transition metals as due to the ratio of the interatomic distance a to the radius r of the 3d electron shell. When the magnetically important 3d electrons of adjacent atoms are relatively close to each other, the exchange interaction, $J_{ex}$, is negative, but when they are further away, the exchange interaction becomes positive, before slowly dropping off.

The idea of relating exchange energy to inter-atomic distance was first proposed by John C. Slater in 1930, and illustrated as a curve on a graph in a review by Sommerfeld and Bethe in 1933.

For a pair of atoms, the exchange interaction w_{ij} (responsible for the energy E) is calculated as:

$w_{ij}= - 2 J_{ex} S_i \cdot S_j$

where: $J_{ex}$ = exchange integral; S = electron spins; i and j = indices of the two atoms.

The Slater curve does produce realistic results, predicting Iron, Cobalt and Nickel to be the elements with ferromagnetic ordering. The curve is of practical use as a simple way of estimating $J_{ex}$ based on the average atomic separation. However, more recent evaluations with realistic calculations of the exchange interactions show significantly more complex physics when treating the interactions of different atomic orbitals in an atom separately, rather than as a single unit.
