= Rose Mooney-Slater =

American physicist (1902–1981)

- Born: Rose Camille LeDieu; October 23, 1902; New Orleans, Louisiana, U.S.
- Died: November 21, 1981 (aged 79)
- Education: Newcomb College (B.S., M.S.); University of Chicago (PhD.)
- Spouses: Carroll Edgerton Mooney; John C. Slater (m. 1954; died 1976)
- Scientific career
- Fields: X-ray crystallography
- Workplaces: Newcomb College; Metallurgical Laboratory; National Bureau of Standards; Massachusetts Institute of Technology; University of Florida

Rose Camille LeDieu Mooney-Slater (23 October 1902 – 21 November 1981) was a professor of physics at the Newcomb College of the Tulane University and the first female X-ray crystallographer in the United States.

== Life ==
Rose Camille LeDieu was born and raised in New Orleans, Louisiana. Mooney-Slater received a B.S. and M.S. in physics from the Newcomb College of the Tulane University in 1926 and 1929, respectively. In 1932, she received a Ph.D. in physics from the University of Chicago.

In 1933, she became a professor of physics at the Newcomb College. She became a Guggenheim Fellow in 1939. In 1941, she was appointed the head of the physics department at Newcomb College. From 1943 to 1944, she worked as a research physicist and crystallographer on the Manhattan Project in the Metallurgical Lab at the University of Chicago. From 1952 to 1956, she worked as a physicist at the National Bureau of Standards. From 1956 to 1981, she served as a research physicist at MIT. From 1966 to 1974, she taught physics at the University of Florida. In 1954 she married fellow physicist John C. Slater. Mooney-Slater died on 21 November 1981.

== Awards ==
She was a Guggenheim Fellow and a fellow of the American Physical Society.
