= Old quantum theory =

Predecessor to modern quantum mechanics (1900–1925)

The old quantum theory is a collection of results from the years 1900–1925, which predate modern quantum mechanics. The theory was never complete or self-consistent, but was instead a set of heuristic corrections to classical mechanics. The theory has come to be understood as the semi-classical approximation to modern quantum mechanics. The main and final accomplishments of the old quantum theory were the determination of the modern form of the periodic table by Edmund Stoner and the Pauli exclusion principle, both of which were premised on Arnold Sommerfeld's enhancements to the Bohr model of the atom.

The main tool of the old quantum theory was the Bohr–Sommerfeld quantization condition, a procedure for selection of certain allowed states of a classical system: the system can then only exist in one of the allowed states and not in any other state.

== History ==
The old quantum theory was instigated by the 1900 work of Max Planck on the emission and absorption of light in a black body with his discovery of Planck's law introducing his quantum of action, and began in earnest after the work of Albert Einstein on the specific heats of solids in 1907 brought him to the attention of Walther Nernst. Einstein solid, followed by the Debye model in 1912, applied quantum principles to the motion of atoms, explaining the specific heat anomaly.

In 1910, Arthur Erich Haas further developed J. J. Thomson's atomic model in a paper that outlined a treatment of the hydrogen atom involving quantization of electronic orbitals, thus anticipating the Bohr model (1913) by three years.

John William Nicholson is noted as the first to create an atomic model that quantized angular momentum as $h/(2\pi)$. Niels Bohr quoted him in his 1913 paper of the Bohr model of the atom.

In 1913, Bohr displayed rudiments of the later defined correspondence principle and used it to formulate a model of the hydrogen atom which explained the line spectrum. In the next few years Arnold Sommerfeld extended the quantum rule to arbitrary integrable systems making use of the principle of adiabatic invariance of the quantum numbers introduced by Hendrik Lorentz and Einstein. Sommerfeld made a crucial contribution by quantizing the z-component of the angular momentum, which in the old quantum era was called "space quantization" (German: Richtungsquantelung). This model, which became known as the Bohr–Sommerfeld model, allowed the orbits of the electron to be ellipses instead of circles, and introduced the concept of quantum degeneracy. The theory would have correctly explained the Zeeman effect, except for the issue of electron spin. Sommerfeld's model was much closer to the modern quantum mechanical picture than Bohr's.

Throughout the 1910s and well into the 1920s, many problems were attacked using the old quantum theory with mixed results. Molecular rotation and vibration spectra were understood and the electron's spin was discovered, leading to the confusion of half-integer quantum numbers. Planck introduced the zero point energy and Sommerfeld semiclassically quantized the relativistic hydrogen atom. Hendrik Kramers explained the Stark effect. Satyendra Nath Bose and Einstein developed the Bose–Einstein statistics for bosons. Einstein also refined the quantization condition in 1917.

=== End of old theory ===
In 1924, Bohr, Kramers and John C. Slater promoted what was known as the BKS theory which considered systems as quantum mechanical but the electromagnetic field as a classical field. However the theory was rejected by the Bothe–Geiger coincidence experiment.

The Sommerfeld extensions of the 1913 solar system Bohr model of the hydrogen atom showing the addition of elliptical orbits to explain spectral fine structure. The circular n=3 corresponds to a higher energy orbital. n=3 has multiple orbits because of azimuthal quantum number.

Kramers prescriptions for calculating transition probabilities between quantum states in terms of Fourier components of the motion, were extended in collaboration with Werner Heisenberg to a semiclassical matrix-like description of atomic transition probabilities. Heisenberg went on to reformulate all of quantum theory in his 1925 Umdeutung paper, in terms these transition rules, later creating matrix mechanics with Max Born and Pascual Jordan.

In parallel in 1924, Louis de Broglie introduced the wave theory of matter, which was extended to a semiclassical equation for matter waves by Einstein a short time later. In 1926 Erwin Schrödinger found a completely quantum mechanical wave-equation, which reproduced all the successes of the old quantum theory without ambiguities and inconsistencies. The Schrödinger equation developed separately from matrix mechanics until Schrödinger and others proved that the two methods predicted the same experimental consequences. Paul Dirac later proved in 1926 that both methods can be obtained from a more general method called transformation theory.

The mathematical formalism of modern quantum mechanics was developed by Dirac and John von Neumann.

=== Other developments ===
In the 1950s Joseph Keller updated Bohr–Sommerfeld quantization using Einstein's interpretation of 1917, now known as Einstein–Brillouin–Keller method. In 1971, Martin Gutzwiller took into account that this method only works for integrable systems and derived a semiclassical way of quantizing chaotic systems from path integrals.

== Basic principles ==
The basic idea of the old quantum theory is that the motion in an atomic system is quantized, or discrete. The system obeys classical mechanics except that not every motion is allowed, only those motions which obey the quantization condition:

$$\oint_{H(p,q)=E} p_i \, dq_i = n_i h$$

where the $p_i$ are the momenta of the system and the $q_i$ are the corresponding coordinates. The quantum numbers $n_i$ are integers and the integral is taken over one period of the motion at constant energy (as described by the Hamiltonian). The integral is an area in phase space, which is a quantity called the action and is quantized in units of the (unreduced) Planck constant. For this reason, the Planck constant was often called the quantum of action.

In order for the old quantum condition to make sense, the classical motion must be separable, meaning that there are separate coordinates $q_i$ in terms of which the motion is periodic. The periods of the different motions do not have to be the same, they can even be incommensurate, but there must be a set of coordinates where the motion decomposes in a multi-periodic way.

The motivation for the old quantum condition was the correspondence principle, complemented by the physical observation that the quantities which are quantized must be adiabatic invariants. Given Planck's quantization rule for the harmonic oscillator, either condition determines the correct classical quantity to quantize in a general system up to an additive constant.

This quantization condition is often known as the Wilson–Sommerfeld rule, proposed independently by William Wilson and Arnold Sommerfeld.

== Examples ==
=== Thermal properties of the harmonic oscillator ===
The simplest system in the old quantum theory is the harmonic oscillator, whose Hamiltonian is:

$$H= {p^2 \over 2m} + {m\omega^2 q^2\over 2}.$$

The old quantum theory yields a recipe for the quantization of the energy levels of the harmonic oscillator, which, when combined with the Boltzmann probability distribution of thermodynamics, yields the correct expression for the stored energy and specific heat of a quantum oscillator both at low and at ordinary temperatures. Applied as a model for the specific heat of solids, this resolved a discrepancy in pre-quantum thermodynamics that had troubled 19th-century scientists. Let us now describe this.

The level sets of H are the orbits, and the quantum condition is that the area enclosed by an orbit in phase space is an integer. It follows that the energy is quantized according to the Planck rule:

$$E= n\hbar \omega,
\,$$

a result which was known well before, and used to formulate the old quantum condition. This result differs by $\tfrac{1}{2}\hbar \omega$ from the results found with the help of quantum mechanics. This constant is neglected in the derivation of the old quantum theory, and its value cannot be determined using it.

The thermal properties of a quantized oscillator may be found by averaging the energy in each of the discrete states assuming that they are occupied with a Boltzmann weight:

$$U = {\sum_n \hbar\omega n e^{-\beta n\hbar\omega} \over \sum_n e^{-\beta n \hbar\omega}} = {\hbar \omega e^{-\beta\hbar\omega} \over 1 - e^{-\beta\hbar\omega}},\;\;\;{\rm where}\;\;\beta = \frac{1}{kT},$$

kT is Boltzmann constant times the absolute temperature, which is the temperature as measured in more natural units of energy. The quantity $\beta$ is more fundamental in thermodynamics than the temperature, because it is the thermodynamic potential associated to the energy.

From this expression, it is easy to see that for large values of $\beta$, for very low temperatures, the average energy U in the harmonic oscillator approaches zero very quickly, exponentially fast. The reason is that kT is the typical energy of random motion at temperature T, and when this is smaller than $\hbar\omega$, there is not enough energy to give the oscillator even one quantum of energy. So the oscillator stays in its ground state, storing next to no energy at all.

This means that at very cold temperatures, the change in energy with respect to beta, or equivalently the change in energy with respect to temperature, is also exponentially small. The change in energy with respect to temperature is the specific heat, so the specific heat is exponentially small at low temperatures, going to zero like

$$\exp(-\hbar\omega/kT)$$

At small values of $\beta$, at high temperatures, the average energy U is equal to $1/\beta = kT$. This reproduces the equipartition theorem of classical thermodynamics: every harmonic oscillator at temperature T has energy kT on average. This means that the specific heat of an oscillator is constant in classical mechanics and equal to k. For a collection of atoms connected by springs, a reasonable model of a solid, the total specific heat is equal to the total number of oscillators times k. There are overall three oscillators for each atom, corresponding to the three possible directions of independent oscillations in three dimensions. So the specific heat of a classical solid is always 3k per atom, or in chemistry units, 3R per mole of atoms.

Monatomic solids at room temperatures have approximately the same specific heat of 3k per atom, but at low temperatures they don't. The specific heat is smaller at colder temperatures, and it goes to zero at absolute zero. This is true for all material systems, and this observation is called the third law of thermodynamics. Classical mechanics cannot explain the third law, because in classical mechanics the specific heat is independent of the temperature.

This contradiction between classical mechanics and the specific heat of cold materials was noted by James Clerk Maxwell in the 19th century, and remained a deep puzzle for those who advocated an atomic theory of matter. Einstein resolved this problem in 1906 by proposing that atomic motion is quantized. This was the first application of quantum theory to mechanical systems. A short while later, Peter Debye gave a quantitative theory of solid specific heats in terms of quantized oscillators with various frequencies (see Einstein solid and Debye model).

=== One-dimensional potential: U = 0 ===
One-dimensional problems are easy to solve. At any energy E, the value of the momentum p is found from the conservation equation:

$$\sqrt{2m(E - U(q))}=\sqrt{2mE} = p = \text{const.}$$

which is integrated over all values of q between the classical turning points, the places where the momentum vanishes. The integral is easiest for a particle in a box of length L, where the quantum condition is:

$$2\int_0^L p \, dq = nh$$

which gives the allowed momenta:

$$p= {nh \over 2L}$$

and the energy levels

$$E_n= {p^2 \over 2m} = {n^2 h^2 \over 8mL^2}$$

=== One-dimensional potential: U = Fx ===
Another easy case to solve with the old quantum theory is a linear potential on the positive halfline, the constant confining force F binding a particle to an impenetrable wall. This case is much more difficult in the full quantum mechanical treatment, and unlike the other examples, the semiclassical answer here is not exact but approximate, becoming more accurate at large quantum numbers.

$$2 \int_0^{\frac{E}{F}} \sqrt{2m(E - Fx)}\ dx= n h$$

so that the quantum condition is

$${4\over 3} \sqrt{2m}{ E^{3/2}\over F } = n h$$

which determines the energy levels,

$$E_n = \left({3nhF\over 4\sqrt{2m}} \right)^{2/3}$$

In the specific case F=mg, the particle is confined by the gravitational potential of the earth and the "wall" here is the surface of the earth.

=== One-dimensional potential: U = 1/2kx^{2} ===
This case is also easy to solve, and the semiclassical answer here agrees with the quantum one to within the ground-state energy. Its quantization-condition integral is

$$2 \int_{-\sqrt{\frac{2E}{k}}}^{\sqrt{\frac{2E}{k}}} \sqrt{2m\left(E - \frac12 k x^2\right)}\ dx = n h$$

with solution

$$E = n \frac{h}{2\pi} \sqrt{\frac{k}{m}} = n\hbar\omega$$

for oscillation angular frequency $\omega$, as before.

=== Rotator ===
Another simple system is the rotator. A rotator consists of a mass M at the end of a massless rigid rod of length R and in two dimensions has the Lagrangian:

$$L = {MR^2 \over 2} \dot\theta^2$$

which determines that the angular momentum J conjugate to $\theta$, the polar angle, $J = MR^2 \dot\theta$. The old quantum condition requires that J multiplied by the period of $\theta$ is an integer multiple of the Planck constant:

$$2\pi J = n h$$

the angular momentum to be an integer multiple of $\hbar$. In the Bohr model, this restriction imposed on circular orbits was enough to determine the energy levels.

In three dimensions, a rigid rotator can be described by two angles — $\theta$ and $\phi$, where $\theta$ is the inclination relative to an arbitrarily chosen z-axis while $\phi$ is the rotator angle in the projection to the x–y plane. The kinetic energy is again the only contribution to the Lagrangian:

$$L = {MR^2\over 2} \dot\theta^2 + {MR^2\over 2} (\sin(\theta)\dot\phi)^2$$

And the conjugate momenta are $p_\theta = \dot\theta$ and $p_\phi=\sin(\theta)^2 \dot\phi$. The equation of motion for $\phi$ is trivial: $p_\phi$ is a constant:

$$p_\phi = l_\phi$$

which is the z-component of the angular momentum. The quantum condition demands that the integral of the constant $l_\phi$ as $\phi$ varies from 0 to $2\pi$ is an integer multiple of h:

$$l_\phi = m \hbar$$

And m is called the magnetic quantum number, because the z component of the angular momentum is the magnetic moment of the rotator along the z direction in the case where the particle at the end of the rotator is charged.

Since the three-dimensional rotator is rotating about an axis, the total angular momentum should be restricted in the same way as the two-dimensional rotator. The two quantum conditions restrict the total angular momentum and the z-component of the angular momentum to be the integers l,m. This condition is reproduced in modern quantum mechanics, but in the era of the old quantum theory it led to a paradox: how can the orientation of the angular momentum relative to the arbitrarily chosen z-axis be quantized? This seems to pick out a direction in space.

This phenomenon, the quantization of angular momentum about an axis, was given the name space quantization, because it seemed incompatible with rotational invariance. In modern quantum mechanics, the angular momentum is quantized the same way, but the discrete states of definite angular momentum in any one orientation are quantum superpositions of the states in other orientations, so that the process of quantization does not pick out a preferred axis. For this reason, the name "space quantization" fell out of favor, and the same phenomenon is now called the quantization of angular momentum.

=== Hydrogen atom ===
The angular part of the hydrogen atom is just the rotator, and gives the quantum numbers l and m. The only remaining variable is the radial coordinate, which executes a periodic one-dimensional potential motion, which can be solved.

For a fixed value of the total angular momentum L, the Hamiltonian for a classical Kepler problem is (the unit of mass and unit of energy redefined to absorb two constants):

$$H= { p_r^2 \over 2 } + {l^2 \over 2 r^2 } - {1\over r}.$$

Fixing the energy to be (a negative) constant and solving for the radial momentum $p_r$, the quantum condition integral is:

$$\oint \sqrt{2E - {l^2\over r^2} + { 2\over r}}\ dr=  k h$$

which can be solved with the method of residues, and gives a new quantum number $k$ which determines the energy in combination with $l$. The energy is:

$$E= -{1 \over 2 (k + l)^2}$$

and it only depends on the sum of k and l, which is the principal quantum number n. Since k is positive, the allowed values of l for any given n are no bigger than n. The energies reproduce those in the Bohr model, except with the correct quantum mechanical multiplicities, with some ambiguity at the extreme values.

== De Broglie waves ==
In 1905, Einstein noted that the entropy of the quantized electromagnetic field oscillators in a box is, for short wavelength, equal to the entropy of a gas of point particles in the same box. The number of point particles is equal to the number of quanta. Einstein concluded that the quanta could be treated as if they were localizable objects (see page 139/140), particles of light. Today we call them photons (a name coined by Gilbert N. Lewis in a letter to Nature.)

Einstein's theoretical argument was based on thermodynamics, on counting the number of states, and so was not completely convincing. Nevertheless, he concluded that light had attributes of both waves and particles, more precisely that an electromagnetic standing wave with frequency $\omega$ with the quantized energy:

$$E = n\hbar\omega
\,$$

should be thought of as consisting of n photons each with an energy $\hbar\omega$. Einstein could not describe how the photons were related to the wave.

The photons have momentum as well as energy, and the momentum had to be $\hbar k$ where $k$ is the wavenumber of the electromagnetic wave. This is required by relativity, because the momentum and energy form a four-vector, as do the frequency and wave-number.

In 1924, as a PhD candidate, Louis de Broglie proposed a new interpretation of the quantum condition. He suggested that all matter, electrons as well as photons, are described by waves obeying the relations.

$$p = \hbar k$$

or, expressed in terms of wavelength $\lambda$ instead,

$$p = {h \over \lambda}$$

He then noted that the quantum condition:

$$\int p \, dx = \hbar \int k \, dx = 2\pi\hbar n$$

counts the change in phase for the wave as it travels along the classical orbit, and requires that it be an integer multiple of $2\pi$. Expressed in wavelengths, the number of wavelengths along a classical orbit must be an integer. This is the condition for constructive interference, and it explained the reason for quantized orbits—the matter waves make standing waves only at discrete frequencies, at discrete energies.

For example, for a particle confined in a box, a standing wave must fit an integer number of wavelengths between twice the distance between the walls. The condition becomes:

$$n\lambda = 2L$$

so that the quantized momenta are:

$$p = \frac{nh}{2L}$$

reproducing the old quantum energy levels.

This development was given a more mathematical form by Einstein, who noted that the phase function for the waves, $\theta(J,x)$, in a mechanical system should be identified with the solution to the Hamilton–Jacobi equation, an equation which William Rowan Hamilton believed to be a short-wavelength limit of a sort of wave mechanics in the 19th century. Schrödinger then found the proper wave equation which matched the Hamilton–Jacobi equation for the phase; this is now known as the Schrödinger equation.

== Kramers transition matrix ==
The old quantum theory was formulated only for special mechanical systems which could be separated into action angle variables which were periodic. It did not deal with the emission and absorption of radiation. Nevertheless, Hendrik Kramers was able to find heuristics for describing how emission and absorption should be calculated.

Kramers suggested that the orbits of a quantum system should be Fourier analyzed, decomposed into harmonics at multiples of the orbit frequency:

$$X_n(t) = \sum_{k=-\infty}^{\infty} e^{ik\omega t} X_{n;k}$$

The index n describes the quantum numbers of the orbit, it would be n–l–m in the Sommerfeld model. The frequency $\omega$ is the angular frequency of the orbit $2\pi/T_n$ while k is an index for the Fourier mode. Bohr had suggested that the k-th harmonic of the classical motion correspond to the transition from level n to level n−k.

Kramers proposed that the transition between states were analogous to classical emission of radiation, which happens at frequencies at multiples of the orbit frequencies. The rate of emission of radiation is proportional to $|X_k|^2$, as it would be in classical mechanics. The description was approximate, since the Fourier components did not have frequencies that exactly match the energy spacings between levels.

This idea led to the development of matrix mechanics.

== Limitations ==
The old quantum theory had some limitations:

- The old quantum theory provides no means to calculate the intensities of the spectral lines.
- It fails to explain the anomalous Zeeman effect (that is, where the spin of the electron cannot be neglected).
- It cannot quantize "chaotic" systems, i.e. dynamical systems in which trajectories are neither closed nor periodic and whose analytical form does not exist. This presents a problem for systems as simple as a 2-electron atom which is classically chaotic analogously to the famous gravitational three-body problem.

However it can be used to describe atoms with more than one electron (e.g. Helium) and the Zeeman effect. It was later proposed that the old quantum theory is in fact the semi-classical approximation to the canonical quantum mechanics but its limitations are still under investigation.

== See also ==
- Bohr model
- Bohr–Sommerfeld model
- BKS theory
