= George F. Koster =

American physicist (1927–2012)

George Fred Koster (1927–2012) was an American physicist.

== Biography ==
Foster served in the United States Navy during World War II. He completed his doctoral dissertation in 1951, titled The Effects of Configuration Interaction on the Hyperfine Structure, advised by Bernard Taub Feld at the Massachusetts Institute of Technology, and later joined the MIT faculty. While teaching at MIT, Foster was elected a fellow of the American Physical Society in 1962.

Foster was married to Frances J. Grigg until her death in 2010. The couple raised three children. Foster died in Brookline, Massachusetts, in May 2012, aged 85.
