= Coincidence method =

Particle physics experimental design developed 1924

In particle physics, the coincidence method (or coincidence technique) is an experimental design through which particle detectors register two or more simultaneous measurements of a particular event through different interaction channels. Detection can be made by sensing the primary particle and/or through the detection of secondary reaction products. Such a method is used to increase the sensitivity of an experiment to a specific particle interaction, reducing conflation with background interactions by creating more degrees of freedom by which the particle in question may interact. The first notable use of the coincidence method was conducted in 1924 by the Bothe–Geiger coincidence experiment.

The higher the rate of interactions or reaction products that can be measured in coincidence, the harder it is to justify such an event occurred from background flux and the higher the experiment's efficiency. As an example, the Cowan and Reines’ neutrino experiment (1956) used a design that featured a four-fold coincidence technique. Particle detectors that rely on measurements of coincidence are often referred to as q-fold, where q is the number of channel measurements which must be triggered to affirm the desired interaction took place. Anti-coincidence counters or "vetos" are often used to filter common backgrounds, such as cosmic rays, from interacting with the primary detection medium. For instance, such a veto is used in the gamma ray observatory COS-B. Detectors relying on coincidence designs are limited by random, chance coincidence events.

== Background ==
Coincidence designs are an essential technique for increasing confidence in signals and reducing random background within a wide range of particle detectors. Common backgrounds include radioactive decay products (beta, alpha, and gamma radiation) and cosmic rays (protons, air showers). Such backgrounds can produce random interactions within a particle detector that may be hard to differentiate from the target particle. If the particle in question is able to trigger multiple channels that are correlated in time or space, it can be determined more likely that the particle is not a background trigger. "Chance" coincidence events may occur, in which all channels are triggered by particles which are not under investigation yet happen to interact with each channel at the same time. In this case, measurements of this chance event may be difficult to separate from measurements of the target events.

A coincidence design must contain two or more measured channels for detecting a particle interaction which can be correlated with each other or the interaction in question over time, space, and/or the properties/products of the interaction. For some experimental setup with q coincidence channels (q-fold coincidence), the rate at which true correlated coincidence events can be measured $R_{q}$ is given by:

$$R_{q} = q\tau^{q-1}\prod_{1}^{q} N_{q}$$

where $N_{q}$ is the count rate of each channel and $\tau$ is the time between counts. The higher the time resolution of the coincidence detector, the easier it is to discriminate between "chance" coincidences and true signals.

The rate at which coincidence events are measured $R_{\rm coincidence}$ compared to the rate at which all suspected signal triggers are measured $R_{\rm suspected}$ defines the efficiency of the detector $\epsilon$:

$$\epsilon = \frac{R_{\rm coincidence}}{R_{\rm suspected}}$$

in which case $R_{\rm coincidence}$ can also be defined by the product of all q channels of coincidence times the raw count of particles available for detection $N$:

$$R_{\rm coincidence} = N\prod_{1}^{q}\epsilon_{q}$$

Therefore, the ability of a detector to successfully confirm signals in coincidence is directly proportional to its efficiency.

== History and notable experiments ==
The use of coincidence detectors in particle physics experiments opened doors to similar methods in nuclear physics, astroparticle physics, and other related fields. A wide variety of operational particle detectors today contain some identifiable form of coincidence or anti-coincidence design.

=== Geiger, Bothe, and the Geiger-Müller counter ===
Diagram of the Compton effect. Geiger and Bothe were looking to characterize the physics of energy transfer within discrete systems of particles. This aspect made the Compton effect a desirable phenomenon of study.

In 1924, physicists Walther Bothe and Hans Geiger used the coincidence method to probe the Compton scattering of gamma rays and x-rays, a phenomenon whose quantum mechanical nature (see particle-wave duality) with regard to energy conservation was ambiguous at the time. The Bothe–Geiger experiment was the first significant coincidence experiment to test the transfer of energy between the incoming photon and the electron in this process. The experiment utilized two Geiger counters: one to detect the initial recoiling election and one to simultaneously detect a secondary electron recoil caused by the photonic product of the first recoil. This setup included a coincidence circuit which measured the process to $\tau$ = 1 ms and with an accuracy of 0.1 ms. In 1954, Bothe won the Nobel Prize in Physics for this work.

=== Conan and Reines' neutrino experiment ===
In 1956, it was known that in order to balance the spin states of a beta decay process, a neutrino of spin 1/2 had to be a product of the reaction $n^{0} \rightarrow \nu + p^{+} + \beta^{-}$, where $n^{0}$ is a neutron, $\nu$ is the neutrino, $p^{+}$ is a proton, and $\beta^{-}$ is a beta particle. In an attempt to build on the theoretical concept of a neutrino by providing empirical evidence for its existence, physicists Clyde L. Cowan and Frederik Reines constructed an experiment outside of a nuclear reactor expected to emit neutrinos. Cowan and Reines decided to construct a four-fold coincidence experiment, for while the proximity to a nuclear reactor provided ample flux of neutrinos, it also created intense backgrounds (neutrons, gamma rays, etc.).

The experiment utilized multiple interaction channels through which the presence of a neutrino (or in this experiment, an antineutrino) could be detected. The antineutrinos would enter a tank of water doped with cadmium chloride and interact with a water molecule's proton. This reaction ($p^{+} + \nu_{-} \rightarrow n^{0} + \beta^{+}$, where $\beta^{+}$ represents a positron and $\nu_{-}$ represents an antineutrino) released positrons which interacted with one of two adjacent tanks of liquid scintillator. The resulting photons could then be measured by photomultiplier tubes installed on the scintillator tanks. While this interaction occurs, the neutron product from the original reaction follows a random walk through the cadmium-doped water until it is absorbed in a cadmium atom. This process then produces more gamma rays, which are subsequently detected. The overall system therefore includes two pairs of simultaneously recorded events, the correlation of which in time provides strong evidence for an interaction involving a neutrino.

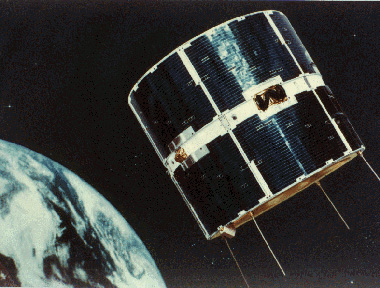
The COS-B gamma ray observatory.

=== COS-B gamma-ray telescope ===
The invention of the coincidence method enlightened new techniques for measuring high-energy cosmic rays. On such experiment, COS-B, launched in 1975 and featured an anti-coincidence veto for charged particles, as well as three scintillation detectors to measure electron cascades caused by incoming gamma radiation. Therefore, gamma ray interactions could be measured with three-fold coincidence, after having passed a charged particle veto (see Anti-Coincidence).

=== Other experiments using coincidence methods ===
- AGS
- AMS
- CHANDLER
- CRESST
- XENON

== Anti-coincidence ==
The anti-coincidence method, similarly to the coincidence method, helps discriminate background interactions from target signals. However, anti-coincidence designs are used to actively reject non-signal particles rather than affirm signal particles. For instance, anti-coincidence counters can be used to shield charged particles when an experiment is explicitly searching for neutral particles, as in the SuperKamiokande neutrino experiment. These charged particles are often cosmic rays.

Anti-coincidence detectors work by flagging or rejecting any events that trigger one channel of the detector, but not another. For a given rate of coincident particle interactions, $R_{\rm coincident}$,

$R_{\rm coincident} = R_{\rm suspected} - R_{\rm uncorrelated}$

where $R_{\rm suspected}$ is the rate of suspected target interactions and $R_{\rm uncorrelated}$ is the rate of all detected, but uncorrelated events across multiple channels. This shows that all uncorrelated events, measured using the anti-coincidence technique, can be removed from the whole of possible interactions to retrieve those affirmable coincident interactions. For any q-fold design, $R_{suspected}$ would include all coincident and all uncorrelated events.
