= Coincidence circuit =

In physics and electrical engineering, a coincidence circuit or coincidence gate is an electronic device with one output and two (or more) inputs. The output activates only when the circuit receives signals within a time window accepted as at the same time and in parallel at both inputs. Coincidence circuits are widely used in particle detectors and in other areas of science and technology.

Walther Bothe shared the Nobel Prize for Physics in 1954 "...for his discovery of the method of coincidence and the discoveries subsequently made by it." Bruno Rossi invented the electronic coincidence circuit for implementing the coincidence method.

== History ==
=== Bothe and Geiger, 1924-1925 ===
In his Nobel Prize lecture, Bothe described how he had implemented the coincidence method in an experiment on Compton scattering in 1924. The experiment aimed to check whether Compton scattering produces a recoil electron simultaneously with the scattered gamma ray. Bothe used two point discharge counters connected to separate fibre electrometers and recorded the fibre deflections on a moving photographic film. On the film record he could discern coincident discharges with a time resolution of approximately 1 millisecond.

=== Bothe and Kohlhörster, 1929 ===
In 1929, Walther Bothe and Werner Kolhörster published the description of a coincidence experiment with tubular discharge counters that Hans Geiger and Walther Müller had invented in 1928. The Bothe-Kohlhörster experiment showed penetrating charged particles in cosmic rays. They used the same mechanical-photographic method for recording simultaneous discharges which, in this experiment, signalled the passage of a charged cosmic ray particle through both counters and through thick wall of lead and iron that surrounded the counters. Their paper, entitled Das Wesen der Höhenstrahlung", was published in the Zeitschrift für Physik v.56, p.751 (1929).

=== Rossi, 1930 ===
Bruno Rossi, at the age of 24, was in his first job as assistant in the Physics Institute of the University of Florence when he read the Bothe-Kohlhörster paper. It inspired him to begin his own research on cosmic rays. He fabricated Geiger tubes according to the published recipe, and he invented the first practical electronic coincident circuit. It employed several triode vacuum tubes, and could register coincident pulses from any number of counters with a tenfold improvement in time resolution over the mechanical method of Bothe. Rossi described his invention in a paper entitled "Method of Registering Multiple Simultaneous Impulses of Several Geiger Counters", published in Nature v.125, p.636 (1930). The Rossi coincidence circuit was rapidly adopted by experimenters around the world. It was the first practical AND circuit, precursor of the AND logic circuits of electronic computers.

To detect the voltage pulse produced by the coincidence circuit when a coincidence event occurred, Rossi first used earphones and counted the ‘clicks’, and soon an electro-mechanical register to count the coincidence pulses automatically. Rossi used a triple-coincidence version of his circuit with various configurations of Geiger counters in a series of experiments during the period from 1930 to 1943 that laid an essential part of the foundations of cosmic-ray and particle physics.

About the same time, and independently of Rossi, Bothe devised a less practical electronic coincidence device. It used a single pentode vacuum tube and could register only twofold coincidences.

== Probability ==
The main idea of 'coincidence detection' in signal processing is that if a detector detects a signal pulse in the midst of random noise pulses inherent in the detector, there is a certain probability, $P$, that the detected pulse is actually a noise pulse. But if two detectors detect the signal pulse simultaneously, the probability that it is a noise pulse in the detectors is $P^2$. Suppose $P=0.1$. Then $P^2=0.01$. Thus the chance of a false detection is reduced by the use of coincidence detection.

== See also ==
- Coincidence detection in neurobiology
