= John C. Slater =

American physicist (1900–1976)

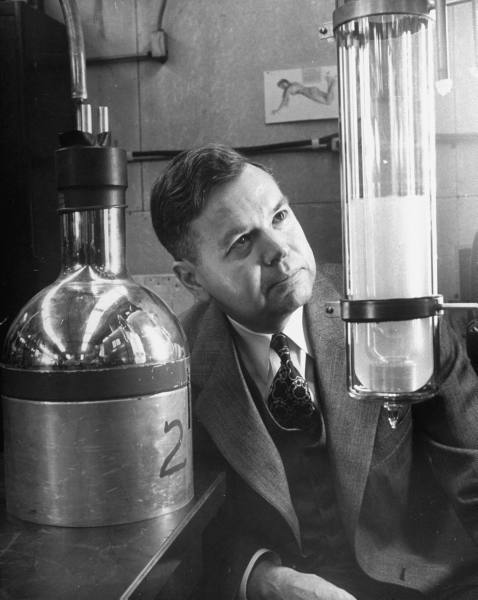
- Slater (1949) by Alfred Eisenstaedt
- Born: John Clarke Slater; December 22, 1900; Oak Park, Illinois, U.S.
- Died: July 25, 1976 (aged 75); Sanibel Island, Florida, U.S.
- Education: University of Rochester (BS); Harvard University (PhD)
- Known for: Slater-type orbitals; Slater determinants; Slater's rules; Slater–Condon rules; Slater–Pauling rule; Slater integrals; Slater–Koster model; Bethe–Slater curve; Bohr–Kramers–Slater theory; Slater–Kirkwood approximation; Muffin-tin approximation; Slater perturbation theory
- Awards: Josiah Willard Gibbs Lectureship (1945); Richtmyer Memorial Award (1951); Irving Langmuir Award (1967); National Medal of Science (1970)
- Scientific career
- Fields: Physics
- Workplaces: University of Cambridge; University of Copenhagen; Harvard University; MIT; Bell Laboratories; Brookhaven National Laboratory; University of Florida
- Thesis: The Compressibility of the Alkali-Halides (1923)
- Doctoral advisor: Percy Williams Bridgman
- Doctoral students: Marvin Chodorow; David S. Saxon; William Shockley; Nathan Rosen; Fernando J. Corbató; Donald Merrifield

John Clarke Slater (December 22, 1900 – July 25, 1976) was an American physicist who advanced the theory of the electronic structure of atoms, molecules and solids. He also made major contributions to microwave electronics. He received a B.S. in physics from the University of Rochester in 1920 and a Ph.D. in physics from Harvard University in 1923, then did post-doctoral work at the universities of Cambridge (briefly) and Copenhagen. On his return to the U.S. he joined the physics department at Harvard.

In 1930, Karl Compton, the president of the Massachusetts Institute of Technology, appointed Slater as chairman of MIT's department of physics. He recast the undergraduate physics curriculum, wrote 14 books between 1933 and 1968, and built a department of international prestige. During World War II, his work on microwave transmission, done partly at the Bell Laboratories and in association with the MIT Radiation Laboratory, was significant in the development of radar.

In 1950, Slater founded the Solid State and Molecular Theory Group (SSMTG) within the physics department. The following year, he resigned the chairmanship of the department and spent a year at the Brookhaven National Laboratory of the Atomic Energy Commission. He was appointed Institute Professor of Physics and continued to direct work in the SSMTG until he retired from MIT in 1965, at the mandatory retirement age of 65.

He then joined the Quantum Theory Project of the University of Florida as research professor, where the retirement age allowed him to work for another five years. The SSMTG has been regarded as the precursor of the MIT Center for Materials Science and Engineering (CMSE). His scientific autobiography and three interviews present his views on research, education and the role of science in society.

Slater was nominated for the Nobel Prize, in both physics and chemistry, multiple times, and received the National Medal of Science in 1970. In 1964, Slater and his then-92-year-old father, who had headed the Department of English at the University of Rochester many years earlier, were awarded honorary degrees by that university. Slater's name is part of the terms Bohr–Kramers–Slater theory, Slater determinant and Slater orbital.

== Early life and education ==
Slater's father, John Rothwell Slater, was born in Virginia. He had been an undergraduate at Harvard and had become head of the English Department at the University of Rochester, which would also be Slater's undergraduate alma mater. Slater's youthful interests were with things mechanical, chemical, and electrical. When Slater entered the University of Rochester in 1917, he took physics courses, as a senior assisted in the physics laboratory and did his first independent research for a special honors thesis, a measurement of the dependence on pressure of the intensities of the Balmer lines of hydrogen.

He was accepted into Harvard graduate school, with the choice of a fellowship or assistantship. He chose the assistantship, during which he worked for Percy W. Bridgman. He followed Bridgman's courses in fundamental physics and was introduced into the then-new quantum physics with the courses of E. C. Kemble. He completed the work for the Ph.D. in three years by publishing his (1924) paper Compressibility of the Alkali Halides, which embodied the thesis work he had done under Bridgman. His heart was in theory, and his first publication was not his doctor's thesis, but a note (1924) to Nature on Radiation and Atoms.

After receiving his Ph.D., Slater held a Hamard Sheldon Fellowship for study in Europe. He spent a period in Cambridge, England, before going to Copenhagen. He did not have a happy time working with Bohr, whom he found domineering, and regretted that his name was attached to the ill-fated Bohr–Kramers–Slater (BKS) theory. Slater already had the idea that it was the photon that carried radiation energy. As he relates:

Bohr was very nice, he invited me to Christmas dinner, I told him about my [photon] ideas, he felt these were fine, “But, you see, they’re much too definite." Now we cannot have this exact conservation. We must not think too specifically about the photons. We don’t have photons like that.” In other words, he wanted to make the whole thing just as vague as he could. Kramers was always Bohr‘s “yes-man” and wanted to do exactly the same thing. He said “This is a fine idea, if we will modify it in such and such ways.” That was the last I saw of it.

Bohr and Kramers wrote the paper, they invited me to sign it, the letter to Nature was the first paragraph out of the paper, they invited me to sign it, take it or leave it. This was my experience with Mr. Bohr and Mr. Kramers. Since then, it has developed in a very interesting way, namely, that I was right and they were wrong. They didn’t realize this until Mr. Bothe came along with his experiment showing that the photons were really there. So I completely failed to make connection with Bohr. I could have made connections with Kramers if it hadn’t been for Bohr, but Kramers was completely playing Bohr’s game.

— John C. Slater as related to Thomas Kuhn,

On the plus side, Slater's name was now well known by association with Bohr. On returning to America, Slater joined the Harvard Physics Department.

== Professional career ==
=== Chairing the Department of Physics at MIT ===
When he became president of MIT, Karl Compton "courted" Slater to chair the physics department. "Administration (of the Department) took up a good deal of time, more time than he (Slater) would have preferred. John was a good chairman." The following items from the successive issues of the annual MIT President's Report trace the growth and visibility of the Department under Slater's leadership, before World War II, and the ability of the department to contribute to defense during the war. The first two quotations are from chapters written by Compton in the successive reports. The other quotations come from the sections about the department, that Slater wrote. These include statements affecting policies in physics education and research at large, and show his deep commitment to both.

- 1930: "The selection of Dr. John C. Slater as head of the (Physics) Department will strengthen ... undergraduate and graduate work ... the limitation of space has retarded the development of graduate work ... the total number of undergraduates being 53 and ... graduate students 16." (p. 21)
- 1931: "This has been the first year of the Department in charge of its new Head, Professor John C. Slater ... the subjects actively (researched include) Spectroscopy, Applied Optics, Discharge of Electricity in Gases, Magneto-Optical Phenomena, Studies of Dielectrics, and various aspects of modern and classical theoretical physics." (p. 42)
- 1932: In the list of papers published by MIT faculty, items 293 to 340 are listed under Department of Physics. (p. 206–208)
- 1933: "The George Eastman Research Laboratory, into which the Department moved at the beginning of the year, provides for the first time a suitable home for research in Physics at the Institute". Slater states that outside recognition is shown by holders of six National, an International, and a Rockefeller Research Fellowship choosing to come to the department. Slater describes the dedication of the Laboratory, the hosting of meetings of the International Astronomical Union, the American Physical Society, and a Spectroscopic conference, and ends: "In general the year has been one of settling down to work under satisfactory conditions, after the more difficult transition of the preceding year." (p. 96–98)
- 1934: "A number of advances in undergraduate teaching have been made or planned." Among the "most conspicuous events" in the department, "we acted as host" to meetings of the National Academy of Sciences, the American Association for the Advancement of Science, the American Physical Society, and a national Spectroscopic Conference, where "the main topic was relation to biology and related fields." Advances in research have been "taking advantage of the unusual facilities" in the department, and include the work of Warren on structure of liquids, Mueller on dielectric properties, Stockbarger on crystal physics, Harrison on automating spectroscopic measurement, Wulff on hyperfine structure, Boyce on spectra of nebulae, Van der Graaff on high voltage and nuclear research, and Stratton and Morse on ellipsoidal wave functions. (p. 104–106)
- 1935: Considerable attention is given to major improvements in undergraduate teaching. The extensive comments on research mention the arrival of Robley Evans and his work on a field new to the department—radioactivity, with special attention to nuclear medicine. (p. 102–103)
- 1936: "The most important development of the year in the Department has been the growing recognition of the significance of applied physics. There has been a tendency in the past among physicists to take interest only in the direct line of development of their science, and to neglect its applications." Slater develops this theme at length, and describes actions within the undergraduate, graduate and faculty work of the department and at the national level to develop Applied Physics. The description of the flourishing basic research refers to ten different areas, including the upsurge in work on radioactivity. (p. 131–134).
- 1937 to 1941: These continue in the same vein. But world affairs begin to impact. The 1941 report ends: "The X-ray branch had as a guest Professor Rose C. L. Mooney of Newcomb College, who was prevented by the war from carrying on research in Europe under a Guggenheim Fellowship ... As the year ends, the National Defense effort is beginning to claim the services of a number of staff members. Presumably the coming year will see a large intensification of the effort, though it is hoped that the interference with the regular research and teaching will not be too severe." (p. 129)
- 1942: This told a very different story. The defense effort had begun to "involve a considerable number of personnel, as well as a good deal of administrative work. With the opening of the Radiation Laboratory of the National Defense Research Committee at the Institute, a number of members of the Department's staff have become associated with that laboratory" followed by a list of over 10 senior faculty who had, and several more gone to other defense projects. (p. 110–111)
- 1943 to 1945: Slater took leave of absence as chair, to work on topics of importance in radar. The American Mathematical Society selected him as the Josiah Willards Gibbs lecturer for 1945.
- 1946: Slater had returned as chair. He starts his report: "The year of reconversion from war to peace has been one of the very greatest activity. ... Physics during the war achieved an importance which has probably never before been attained by any other science. The Institute, as the leading technical institution of the country and probably the world, should properly have a physics department unequaled anywhere." He lists plans to meet this objective, that proliferate his administrative responsibilities. (p. 133–143)
  Setting up interdepartmental laboratories, by restructuring existing laboratories using, as a model, the conversion of the Radiation Laboratory into the Research Laboratory of Electronics (RLE) by Julius Stratton and Albert Hill.
  Financing student assistantships and helping shape the role of government financing on an unprecedented scale.
  Overseeing Robley Evans' Radioactivity Center (containing a cyclotron) and Van de Graaff's High Voltage Laboratory.
  Recruiting physicists familiar with the Manhattan Project to build the Laboratory for Nuclear Science and Engineering. This was directed by Jerrold Zacharias. Its first members included Bruno Rossi and Victor Weisskopf.
  Setting up the Acoustics Laboratory, directed by Richard Bolt, and the Spectroscopy Laboratory directed by the chemist Richard Lord.
- 1947: With the hiring of staff and building of laboratories well in hand, Slater begins: "The year in the Physics Department, as in the rest of the Institute, was one of starting the large-scale teaching of returned veterans and other students whose academic careers had been interrupted by the war." He goes on to discuss the needs of students, in the entire Institute, for Physics courses and laboratories, with particular mention of the upsurge in electronics and nuclear science, and he reports briefly on the developments following from his previous report. (p. 139–141)
- 1948: Slater begins "The current year is the first since the war in which the department has approached normal operation. No new major projects or changes of policy have been introduced." But the department that he has built is vastly different from what it was when he started. Sixteen master's degrees and 47 doctor's degrees were granted. Twenty-five Ph.D. recipients got academic appointments in MIT and other universities. Research flourished, and many scientists visited from European universities and elsewhere in the U.S. (p. 141–143)
- 1949: The new-styled "normalcy" continued. "The approach to a steady postwar state continued with few unusual occurrences." The graduate curriculum has been revised and cryogenics enhanced. The continued growth of staff, research grants, industrial contacts and volume of publication are treated as matters of continuity, recognizing at the end, that: "The administrative load of the department has grown so much (it became) wise to appoint an executive officer". Nathaniel Frank, who had worked with John Slater for nearly two decades accepted the post. (p. 149–153)
- 1950: The future of the department had been set. There were "few unexpected changes". And with the continued growth, "almost every research project in the Department has concerned itself with undergraduate research". (p. 189–191)
- 1951: Jay Stratton writes: "Professor John C. Slater resigned as Head of the Department of Physics and has been appointed Harry B. Higgins Professor of the Solid State, the first appointment which will carry the title Institute Professor. Professor Slater has been granted a leave of absence for the coming year to carry on research at Brookhaven National Laboratory." (p. 30)

Throughout his chairmanship, Slater taught, wrote books, produced ideas of major scientific importance, and interacted with colleagues throughout the local, national and international scientific communities. At the personal level, Morse states: "Through most of (the 1930s) he looked more like an undergraduate than a department head ... he could render his guests weak with laughter simply by counting ... in Danish." Much later, S. B. Trickey wrote: "While I got to know him reasonably well, I was never able to call J. C. Slater by his given name. His seeming aloofness turned out more to be shyness."

== Research ==
=== Atoms, molecules and solids: research preceding World War II ===
Returning in time to 1920, Slater had gone to Harvard to work for a Ph.D. with Percy Bridgman, who studied the behaviour of substances under very high pressures. Slater measured the compressibility of common salt and ten other alkali halides—compounds of lithium, sodium, potassium and rubidium, with fluorine, chlorine and bromine. He described the results as "exactly in accord with Bohr's recent views of the relation between electron structure and the periodic table". This brought Slater's observation concerning the mechanical properties of ionic crystals into line with the theory that Bohr had based on the spectroscopy of gaseous elements. He wrote the alkali halide paper in 1923, having "by the summer of 1922" been "thoroughly indoctrinated ... with quantum theory", in part by the courses of Edwin Kemble following a fascination with Bohr's work during his undergraduate days. In 1924, Slater went to Europe on a Harvard Sheldon Fellowship. After a brief stay at the University of Cambridge, he went on to the University of Copenhagen, where "he explained to Bohr and Kramers his idea (that was) a sort of forerunner of the duality principle, (hence) the celebrated paper" on the work that others dubbed the Bohr–Kramers–Slater (BKS) theory. "Slater suddenly became an internationally known name." Interest in this "old-quantum-theory" paper subsided with the arrival of full quantum mechanics, but Philp M.Harvard University Morse's biography states that "in recent years it has been recognized that the correct ideas in the article are those of Slater". Slater discusses his early life through the trip to Europe in a transcribed interview.

Slater joined the Harvard faculty on his return from Europe in 1925, then moved to MIT in 1930. His research papers covered many topics. A year by year selection, up to his switch to work relating to radar includes:

- 1924: the theoretical part of his Ph.D. work, the Bohr–Kramers–Slater (BKS) theory,
- 1925: widths of spectral lines; ideas that came very close to the electron spins principle,
- 1926 and 1927: explicit attention to electron spin, and to the Schrödinger equation;
- 1928: the Hartree self-consistent field, the Rydberg formula,
- 1929: the determinantal expression for an antisymmetric wave function,
- 1930: Slater-type orbitals (STOs) and atomic shielding constants,
- 1931: linear combination of atomic orbitals, van der Waals forces (with Jack Kirkwood, as a chemistry research associate).
- 1932 to 1935: atomic orbitals, metallic conduction, application of the Thomas–Fermi method to metals,
- 1936: ferromagnetism, (with Erik Rudberg, later chairman of the Nobel Prize committee for Physics) inelastic scattering, and (with his Ph.D. student William Shockley and close to his own Ph.D. topic), optical properties of alkali halides
- 1937 and 1938: augmented plane waves, superconductivity, ferromagnetism, electrodynamics,
- 1939 he published "only" a book: the definitive Introduction to Chemical Physics,
- 1940 the Grüneisen constant, and the Curie point,
- 1941 phase transition analogous to ferromagnetism in potassium dihydrogen phosphate.

In his memoir, Morse wrote: "In addition to other notable papers ... on ... Hartree's self-consistent field, the quantum mechanical derivation of the Rydberg constant, and the best values of atomic shielding constants, he wrote a seminal paper on directing valency" (what became known, later, as linear combination of atomic orbitals). In further comments, John Van Vleck pays particular attention to (1) the 1925 study of the spectra of hydrogen and ionized helium, that J. V. V. considers one sentence short of proposing electron spin (which would have led to sharing a Nobel prize), and (2) what J. V. V. regards as Slater's greatest paper, that introduced the mathematical object now called the Slater determinant. "These were some of the achievements (that led to his) election to the National Academy ... at ... thirty-one. He played a key role in lifting American theoretical physics to high international standing." Slater's doctoral students, during this time, included Nathan Rosen Ph.D. in 1932 for a theoretical study of the hydrogen molecule, and William Shockley Ph.D. 1936 for an energy band structure of sodium chloride, who later received a Nobel Prize for the discovery of the transistor.

=== Research during the war and the return to peace-time activities ===
Slater, in his experimental and theoretical work on the magnetron (key elements paralleled his prior work with self-consistent fields for atoms) and on other topics at the Radiation Laboratory and at the Bell Laboratories did "more than any other person to provide the understanding requisite to progress in the microwave field", in the words of Mervin Kelley, then head of Bell Labs, quoted by Morse.

Slater' publications during the war and the post-war recovery include a book and papers on microwave transmission and microwave electronics, linear accelerators, cryogenics, and, with Francis Bitter and several other colleagues, superconductors, These publications credit the many other scientists, mathematicians and engineers who participated. Among these, George H. Vineyard received his Ph.D. with Slater in 1943 for a study of space charge in the cavity magnetron. Later, he became director of the Brookhaven National Laboratory and President of the American Physical Society. The work of the Radiation Laboratory paralleled research at the Telecommunications Research Establishment in England, and the groups maintained a productive liaison.

=== The Solid State and Molecular Theory Group ===
==== Activities ====
In the words of Robert Nesbet: "Slater founded the SSMTG with the idea of bringing together a younger generation of students and PostDocs with a common interest in the electronic structure and properties of atoms, molecules and solids. This was in part to serve as a balance for electronic physics to survive the overwhelming growth of nuclear physics following the war."

George F. Koster soon completed his Ph.D., joined the faculty, and became the senior member of the group. He wrote: "During the fifteen-year life of the group some sixty persons were members and thirty-four took doctoral degrees with theses connected with its work. In my report I have been unable to separate the work of Slater from that of the group as a whole. He was part of every aspect of the group's research efforts."

Nesbet continued: "Every morning in SSMTG began with a coffee session, chaired by Professor Slater, with the junior members seated around a long table ... Every member of the group was expected to contribute a summary of his own work and ideas to the Quarterly Progress Report". The SMMTG QPRs had a wide distribution to university and industrial research libraries, and to individual laboratories. They were quoted widely for scientific and biographical content, in journal articles and government reports and libraries are starting to put them online.

To begin the work of the group, Slater "distilled his experience with the Hartree self-consistent field method" into (1) a simplification that became known as the Xα method, and (2) a relationship between a feature of this method and a magnetic property of the system. These required computations that were excessive for "pencil and paper" work. Slater was quick to avail the SSMTG of the electronic computers that were being developed. An early paper on augmented plane waves used an IBM card programmed calculator. The Whirlwind was used heavily, then the IBM 704 in the MIT Computation Center and then the IBM 709 in the Cooperative Computing Laboratory (see below).

Solid-state work progressed more rapidly at first in the SSMTG, with contributions over the first few years by George F. Koster, John Wood, Arthur Freeman and Leonard Mattheis. Molecular and atomic calculations also flourished in the hands of Fernando J. Corbató, Lee Allen and Alvin Meckler. This initial work followed lines largely set by Slater. Michael Barnett came in 1958. He and John Wood were given faculty appointments. Robert Nesbet, Brian Sutcliffe, Malcolm Harrison and Levente Szasz brought in a variety of further approaches to molecular and atomic problems. Jens Dahl, Alfred Switendick, Jules Moskowitz, Donald Merrifield and Russell Pitzer did further work on molecules, and Fred Quelle on solids.

Slater rarely included his name on the papers of SSMTG members who worked with him. Major pieces of work which he did coauthor dealt with applications of (1) group theory in band structure calculations and (2) equivalent features of linear combination of atomic orbitals (LCAO), tight binding and Bloch electron approximations, to interpolate results for the energy levels of solids, obtained by more accurate methods.

==== People ====
A partial list of members of the SSMTG (Ph.D. students, post-doctoral members, research staff and faculty, in some cases successively, labeled †, ‡, ৳, ¶), together with references that report their SSMTG and later activities, follows.

- Leland C. Allen †‡, ab initio molecular calculations, electronegativity, Professor of Chemistry Emeritus, Princeton University (2011).
- Michael P Barnett ৳¶, molecular integrals, software, phototypesetting, cognition, later in industry, Columbia U. and CUNY.
- Louis Burnelle‡, molecular calculations, later professor of chemistry, New York University.
- Earl Callen †
- Fernando J. Corbató †, began the molecular calculations in the SSMTG; later a pioneer of time-sharing and recipient of the Turing Award.
- George Coulouris ৳, worked with MPB, later professor of computer science at Queen Mary College of the University of London.
- Imre Csizmadia ‡, molecular calculations (LiH), later Professor of Chemistry, U. Toronto, ab initio calculations, drug design.
- Jens Dahl ‡, molecular calculations, later professor of chemistry, Technical University of Denmark, wrote quantum chemistry text.
- Donald E. Ellis ৳†, molecular calculations, later Professor of Physics and Astronomy at Northwestern University, "real" materials.
- Arthur Freeman †‡, orthogonalized plane wave calculations, later professor of physics and astronomy at Northwestern University
- Robert P. Futrelle ৳, programming methods, later Professor of Computer and Information Science at Northeastern University.
- Leon Gunther †‡ lattice vibrations in alkali halides, later Professor of Physics at Tufts University, focus on condensed matter theory in many areas, including superconductivity and seminal papers on nanoscopic physics & quantum tunneling of magnetization.
- Malcolm Harrison ‡, (died 2007) co-developer of POLYATOM, later professor of computer science, New York University.
- Frank Herman, band structure calculations, went into RCA then IBM Research Laboratories, wrote and edited major surveys.
- David Howarth ‡, solid state, later professor of computer science, Imperial College, University of London.
- John Iliffe ৳, computer scientist.
- San-Ichiro Ishigura ‡, later Professor, Ochinamizu University
- Arnold Karo ‡, electronic structure of small molecules, later at Lawrence Livermore Laboratory.
- C.W. Kern ‡, molecular calculations, later Professor of Chemistry, Ohio State U., published extensively.
- Ryoichi Kikuchi ‡
- Walter H. Kleiner, solid state physics, continued at Lincoln Laboratory.
- George F. Koster †¶, became Chairman of the Physics Graduate Committee at MIT and wrote two books on solid state physics.
- Leonard F. Mattheiss †, augmented plane wave calculations, later at Bell Labs, published about 100 papers.
- Roy McWeeny ‡, valence theory, later held chairs at several British Universities and, since 1982, at the University of Pisa, Italy.
- Alvin Meckler, first major molecular calculation on Whirlwind (oxygen), later National Security Agency,
- Donald Merrifield †, molecular calculations (methane), later President of Loyola University, Los Angeles.
- Jules Moskowitz ‡, molecular calculations (benzene), later chairman, Department of Chemistry, NYU, published 100 papers.
- Robert K. Nesbet ‡, molecular calculations, later at IBM Almaden Research Laboratories, published over 200 papers.
- Robert H. Parmenter, later professor of physics, U. Arizona, crystal properties and superconductivity.
- Russell M. Pitzer ‡, molecular calculations (ethane), later Chairman of Chemistry Department, Ohio State U, over 100 papers.
- George W. Pratt Jr. †‡later Professor of Electrical Engineering and CMSE, MIT, solid state electronics.
- F.W. Quelle Jr. augmented plane waves, later laser optics.
- Melvin M. Saffren †
- Robert Schrieffer wrote Bachelor's thesis on multiplets in heavy atoms, later shared Nobel Prize for BCS theory of superconductivity.
- Edward Schultz
- Harold Schweinler
- Hermann Statz ‡, ferromagnetism, later director of research at Raytheon and recipient of 2004 IEEE Microwave Pioneer Award,
- Levente Szasz, atomic structure, became professor of physics at Fordham University, published two books,
- Brian T. Sutcliffe ‡, co-developer of POLYATOM, later professor of chemistry, University of York.
- Richard E. Watson ‡៛, electronic properties of metal atoms, later at Brookhaven, published over 200 papers.
- E.B. White †
- John Wood †¶, augmented plane waves using Hartree–Fock methods, at Los Alamos National Laboratory (died 1986), published extensively.

Distinguished visitors included Frank Boys, Alex Dalgarno, Ugo Fano, Anders Fröman, Inga Fischer-Hjalmars, Douglas Hartree, Werner Heisenberg, Per-Olov Löwdin, Chaim Pekeris, Ivar Waller and Peter Wohlfarth.

=== Slater's further activities at MIT during this time ===
In the 1962 President's Report, Jay Stratton wrote (p. 17): "A faculty committee under the chairmanship of Professor John C. Slater has taken primary responsibility for planning the facilities in the new Center for Materials. These include a new Cooperative Computing Laboratory completed this year and equipped with an I.B.M. 709 Computer".

The name Center for Materials Science and Engineering (CMSE) was adopted soon afterward. It embodied the ethos of interdepartmental research and teaching that Slater had espoused throughout his career. The first director was R. A. Smith, previously head of the physics division of the Royal Radar Establishment in England. He, Slater and Charles Townes, the provost, had been in close acquaintance since the early years of World War II, working on overlapping topics.

The center was set up, in accordance with Slater's plans. It "supported research and teaching in Metallurgy and Materials Science, Electrical Engineering, Physics, Chemistry and Chemical Engineering", and preserved MIT as a focus for work in solid state physics. By 1967, two years after Slater left, the MIT Physics Department "had a very, very small commitment to condensed matter physics" because it was so "heavily into high energy physics". But in the same year, the CMSE staff included 55 professors and 179 graduate students. The Center continues to flourish in the 21st century.

The Cooperative Computing Laboratory (CCL) was used, in its first year by some 400 faculty, students and staff. These included (1) members of the SSMTG and the CCL running quantum mechanical calculations and non-numeric applications directed by Slater, Koster, Wood and Barnett, (2) the computer-aided design team of Ross, Coons and Mann, (3) members of the Laboratory for Nuclear Science, (4) Charney and Phillips in theoretical meteorology, and (5) Simpson and Madden in geophysics (from 1964 President's report, p. 336–337).

== Personal life and death ==
In 1926, he had married Helen Frankenfeld. Their three children (Louise Chapin, John Frederick, and Clarke Rothwell) all followed academic careers. Slater was divorced and in 1954 married Rose Mooney, a physicist and crystallographer, who moved to Florida with him in 1965.

At the University of Florida (Gainesville), where the retirement age was 70, Slater was able to enjoy another five years of active research and publication as a research professor in the Quantum Theory Project (QTP). In 1975, in his scientific autobiography, he wrote: "The Florida Physics Department was a congenial one, with main emphasis on solid state physics, statistical physics and related fields. It reminded me of the MIT department in the days when I had been department head there. It was a far cry from the MIT Physics Department which I was leaving; by then it had been literally captured by the nuclear theorists." Slater published to the end of his life: his final journal paper, published with John Connolly in 1976, was on a novel approach to molecular orbital theory.

Slater died in Sanibel Island, Florida, in 1976.

== As an educator and advisor ==
Slater's concern for others is illustrated by a dialog that Richard Feynman relates. It took place at the end of Feynman's undergraduate days at MIT, when he wanted to stay on to do a Ph.D. "When I went to Professor Slater and told him of my intentions he said: 'We will not have you here'. I said: 'What?' Slater said: 'Why do you think you should go to graduate school at MIT?' 'Because it is the best school for science in the country' ... 'That is why you should go to some other school. You should find out how the rest of the world is.' So I went to Princeton. ... Slater was right. And I often advise my students the same way. Learn what the rest of the world is like. The variety is worthwhile."

== Summary ==
From the memoir by Philip Morse: "He contributed significantly to the start of the quantum revolution in physics; he was one of the very few American-trained physicists to do so. He was exceptional in that he persisted in exploring atomic, molecular and solid state physics, while many of his peers were coerced by war, or tempted by novelty, to divert to nuclear mysteries."

To paraphrase John Connolly, it can be said that the contributions of John C. Slater and his students in the SSMTG and the Quantum Theory Project laid the foundations of the density functional theory approximation in quantum theory.

Slater's papers were bequeathed to the American Philosophical Society by his widow, Rose Mooney Slater, in 1980 and 1982. In August 2003, Alfred Switendick donated a collection of Quarterly Reports of the MIT Solid State and Molecular Theory Group (SSMTG), dating from 1951 to 1965.

== Awards and honors ==
- Elected to the American Academy of Arts and Sciences (1927)
- Elected to the United States National Academy of Sciences (1932)
- Elected to the American Philosophical Society (1940)
- Irving Langmuir Award (1967)
- Golden Plate Award of the American Academy of Achievement (1969)
- National Medal of Science (1970)

== Books ==
- Slater, J. C.; N. H. Frank (1933). Introduction to Theoretical Physics. New York: McGraw-Hill. ISBN 978-0-07-058090-9.
- Slater, J. C.; N. H. Frank (1947). Mechanics. New York: McGraw-Hill. ISBN 978-0-313-24064-5.
- Slater, J. C.; N. H. Frank (1947). Electromagnetism. New York: McGraw-Hill.
- Slater, J. C. (1950). Microwave Electronics. New York: Van Nostrand.
- Slater, J. C. (1951); Quantum Theory of Matter (1st ed.) New York: McGraw-Hill File:Quantum theory of matter, by John C. Slater, 1951.pdf
- Slater, J. C. (1955). Modern Physics. New York: McGraw-Hill.
- Slater, J. C. (1939). Introduction to Chemical Physics. New York: Dover. ISBN 978-0-486-62562-1.
- Slater, J. C. (1959). Microwave Transmission. New York: Dover.
- Slater, J. C. (1960). Quantum Theory of Atomic Structure. New York: McGraw-Hill.
- Slater, J. C. (1968). Quantum Theory of Matter (2nd ed.). New York: McGraw-Hill. ISBN 978-0-88275-553-3.
- Slater, J. C. (1963–74). Quantum Theory of Molecules and Solids, Vol. 1: Electronic Structure of Molecules. New York: McGraw-Hill.
- Slater, J. C. (1963–74). Quantum Theory of Molecules and Solids, Vol. 2: Symmetry and Energy Bands in Crystals. New York: McGraw-Hill.
- Slater, J. C. (1963–74). Quantum Theory of Molecules and Solids, Vol. 3: Insulators, Semiconductors, and Metals. New York: McGraw-Hill.
- Slater, J. C. (1963–74). Quantum Theory of Molecules and Solids, Vol. 4: The Self-Consistent Field for Molecules and Solids. New York: McGraw-Hill.
- Slater, J. C. (1975). Solid-State and Molecular Theory: A Scientific Biography. New York: Wiley. ISBN 978-0-471-79681-7.
- Slater, J. C. (1979). The Calculation of Molecular Orbitals. New York: Wiley. ISBN 978-0-471-03181-9.
