= BKS theory =

Theory in quantum mechanics

In the history of quantum mechanics, the Bohr–Kramers–Slater (BKS) theory was perhaps the final attempt at understanding the interaction of matter and electromagnetic radiation on the basis of the so-called old quantum theory, in which quantum phenomena are treated by imposing quantum restrictions on classically describable behaviour. It was advanced in 1924, and sticks to a classical wave description of the electromagnetic field. It was perhaps more a research program than a full physical theory, the ideas that are developed not being worked out in a quantitative way. The purpose of BKS theory was to disprove Einstein's hypothesis of the light quantum.

One aspect, the idea of modelling atomic behaviour under incident electromagnetic radiation using "virtual oscillators" at the absorption and emission frequencies, rather than the (different) apparent frequencies of the Bohr orbits, significantly led Max Born, Werner Heisenberg and Hendrik Kramers to explore mathematics that strongly inspired the subsequent development of matrix mechanics, the first form of modern quantum mechanics. The provocativeness of the theory also generated great discussion and renewed attention to the difficulties in the foundations of the old quantum theory. However, physically the most provocative element of the theory, that momentum and energy would not necessarily be conserved in each interaction but only overall, statistically, was soon shown to be in conflict with experiment.

Walther Bothe won the Nobel Prize in Physics in 1954 for the Bothe–Geiger coincidence experiment that experimentally disproved BKS theory.

== Origins ==
When Albert Einstein introduced the light quantum (photon) in 1905, there was much resistance from the scientific community. However, when in 1923, the Compton effect showed the results could be explained by assuming the light beam behaves as light-quanta and that energy and momentum are conserved, Niels Bohr was still resistant against quantized light, even repudiating it in his 1922 Nobel Prize lecture. So Bohr found a way of using Einstein's approach without also using the light-quantum hypothesis by reinterpreting the principles of energy and momentum conservation as statistical principles. Thus, it was in 1924 that Bohr, Hendrik Kramers and John C. Slater published a provocative description of the interaction of matter and electromagnetic interaction, historically known as the BKS paper that combined quantum transitions and electromagnetic waves with energy and momentum being conserved only on average.

The initial idea of the BKS theory originated with Slater, who proposed to Bohr and Kramers the following elements of a theory of emission and absorption of radiation by atoms, to be developed during his stay in Copenhagen:

1. Emission and absorption of electromagnetic radiation by matter is realized in agreement with Einstein's photon concept;
2. A photon emitted by an atom is guided by a classical electromagnetic field (cf. Louis de Broglie's ideas published September 1923) consisting of spherical waves, thus enabling an explanation of interference;
3. Even when there are no transitions there exists a classical field to which all atoms contribute; this field contains all frequencies at which an atom can emit or absorb a photon, the probability of such an emission being determined by the amplitude of the corresponding Fourier component of the field; the probabilistic aspect is provisional, to be eliminated when the dynamics of the inside of atoms are better known;
4. The classical field is not produced by the actual motions of the electrons but by "motions with the frequencies of possible emission and absorption lines" (to be called 'virtual oscillators', creating a field to be referred to as 'virtual' as well).

This fourth point reverts to Max Planck's original view of his quantum introduction in 1900. Planck also did not believe that light was quantized. He believed that a black body had virtual oscillators and that only during interactions between light and the virtual oscillators of the body was the quantum to be considered. Max Planck said in 1911,

Mr. Einstein, it would be necessary to conceive … [of] light waves themselves as atomistically constituted, and hence to give up Maxwell's equations. This seems to me a step which in my opinion is not yet necessary…. I think that first of all one should attempt to transfer the whole problem of the quantum theory to the area of the interaction between matter and radiation.”

Independently, Franz S. Exner had also suggested the statistical validity of energy conservation in the same spirit as the second law of thermodynamics. Erwin Schrödinger, who did his habilitation under the supervision of Exner, was very supportive of the BKS theory. Schrödinger published a paper to provide his own interpretation of the BKS statistical interpretation.

== Development with Bohr and Kramers ==
Slater's main intention seems to have been to reconcile the two conflicting models of radiation, viz. the wave and particle models. He may have had good hopes that his idea with respect to oscillators vibrating at the differences of the frequencies of electron rotations (rather than at the rotation frequencies themselves) might be attractive to Bohr because it solved a problem of the latter's atomic model, even though the physical meaning of these oscillators was far from clear. Nevertheless, Bohr and Kramers had two objections to Slater's proposal:

1. The assumption that photons exist. Even though Einstein's photon hypothesis could explain in a simple way the photoelectric effect, as well as conservation of energy in processes of de-excitation of an atom followed by excitation of a neighboring one, Bohr had always been reluctant to accept the reality of photons, his main argument being the problem of reconciling the existence of photons with the phenomenon of interference;
2. The impossibility to account for conservation of energy in a process of de-excitation of an atom followed by excitation of a neighboring one. This impossibility followed from Slater's probabilistic assumption, which did not imply any correlation between processes going on in different atoms.

As Max Jammer puts it, this refocussed the theory "to harmonize the physical picture of the continuous electromagnetic field with the physical picture, not as Slater had proposed of light quanta, but of the discontinuous quantum transitions in the atom." Bohr and Kramers hoped to be able to evade the photon hypothesis on the basis of ongoing work by Kramers to describe "dispersion" (in present-day terms inelastic scattering) of light by means of a classical theory of interaction of radiation and matter. But abandoning the concept of the photon, they instead chose to squarely accept the possibility of non-conservation of energy, and momentum.

== Experimental counter-evidence ==
In the BKS paper the Compton effect was discussed as an application of the idea of "statistical conservation of energy and momentum" in a continuous process of scattering of radiation by a sample of free electrons, where "each of the electrons contributes through the emission of coherent secondary wavelets". Although Arthur Compton had already given an attractive account of his experiment on the basis of the photon picture (including conservation of energy and momentum in individual scattering processes), it is stated in the BKS paper that "it seems at the present state of science hardly justifiable to reject a formal interpretation as that under consideration [i.e. the weaker assumption of statistical conservation] as inadequate". This statement may have prompted experimental physicists to improve `the present state of science' by testing the hypothesis of `statistical energy and momentum conservation'. In any case, already after one year the BKS theory was disproved by coincidence methods studying correlations between the directions into which the emitted radiation and the recoil electron are emitted in individual scattering processes. Such experiments were carried independently, with the Bothe–Geiger coincidence experiment performed by Walther Bothe and Hans Geiger, as well as the experiment by Compton and Alfred W. Simon. They provided experimental evidence pointing in the direction of energy and momentum conservation in individual scattering processes (at least, it was shown that the BKS theory was not able to explain the experimental results). More accurate experiments, performed much later, have also confirmed these results.

Commenting on the experiments, Max von Laue considered that “physics was saved from being led astray.”

From the very beginning, Wolfgang Pauli was extremely critical of the BKS theory, referring to it as the Copenhagen putsch (German: Kopenhagener Putsch). In a letter to Kramers, Pauli said that Bohr would have abandoned the theory even if no experiment was ever carried out, arguing that it is the notion of motion and forces that needs to be modified, not the conservation of energy. Pauli could not help to mock the theory, proposing to the Institute of Physics in Copenhague to “fly its flag at half mast on the anniversary of the publication of the work of Bohr, Kramers and Slater.”

As suggested by a letter to Max Born, for Einstein, the corroboration of energy and momentum conservation was probably even more important than his photon hypothesis:

Bohr's opinion of radiation interests me very much. But I don't want to let myself be driven to a renunciation of strict causality before there has been a much stronger resistance against it than up to now. I cannot bear the thought that an electron exposed to a ray should by its own free decision choose the moment and the direction in which it wants to jump away. If so, I'd rather be a cobbler or even an employee in a gambling house than a physicist. It is true that my attempts to give the quanta palpable shape have failed again and again, but I'm not going to give up hope for a long time yet.

In light of the experimental results, Bohr informed Charles Galton Darwin that "there is nothing else to do than to give our revolutionary efforts as honourable a funeral as possible".

Bohr's reaction, too, was not primarily related to the photon hypothesis. According to Werner Heisenberg, Bohr remarked:

Even if Einstein sends me a cable that an irrevocable proof of the physical existence of light-quanta has now been found, the message cannot reach me, because it has to be transmitted by electromagnetic waves.

For Bohr the lesson to be learned from the disproof of the BKS theory was not that photons do exist, but rather that the applicability of classical space-time pictures in understanding phenomena within the quantum domain is limited. This theme would become particularly important a few years later in developing the notion of complementarity. According to Heisenberg, Born's statistical interpretation also had its ultimate roots in the BKS theory. Hence, despite its failure the BKS theory still provided an important contribution to the revolutionary transition from classical mechanics to quantum mechanics.

Schrödinger would not abandon the statistical interpretation and would continue to push this theory until the end of his life.
