= Sommerfeld (disambiguation) =

Sommerfeld as a surname may refer to:

- Arnold Sommerfeld (1868–1951), German physicist
- Felix A. Sommerfeld (1879–after 1930), German secret service agent
- Helga Sommerfeld (1941–1991), German actress
- Sara Sommerfeld (born 28 October 1977), Swedish actress

Sommerfeld as a place may refer to:

- Sommerfeld, the German name of Lubsko, Poland.
- Sommerfeld, a small town, now a district of Leipzig, Germany.
- Sommerfeld, a Mennonite colony in Santa Cruz Department, Bolivia.

Sommerfeld may also refer to:

- Sommerfeld (crater), a large lunar crater
- Sommerfeld radiation condition, used to solve the Helmholtz equation
- Sommerfeld Tracking, a prefabricated airfield surface, nicknamed 'tin lino'
- Sommerfeld–Kossel displacement law, in atomic physics
- Grimm–Sommerfeld rule, in quantum chemistry
- Dr. Sommerfeld – Neues vom Bülowbogen, a German television series

== See also ==
- List of things named after Arnold Sommerfeld
- Sommerfeld Mennonites
- Sommerfelder
- Sommerfield
