= List of things named after Arnold Sommerfeld =

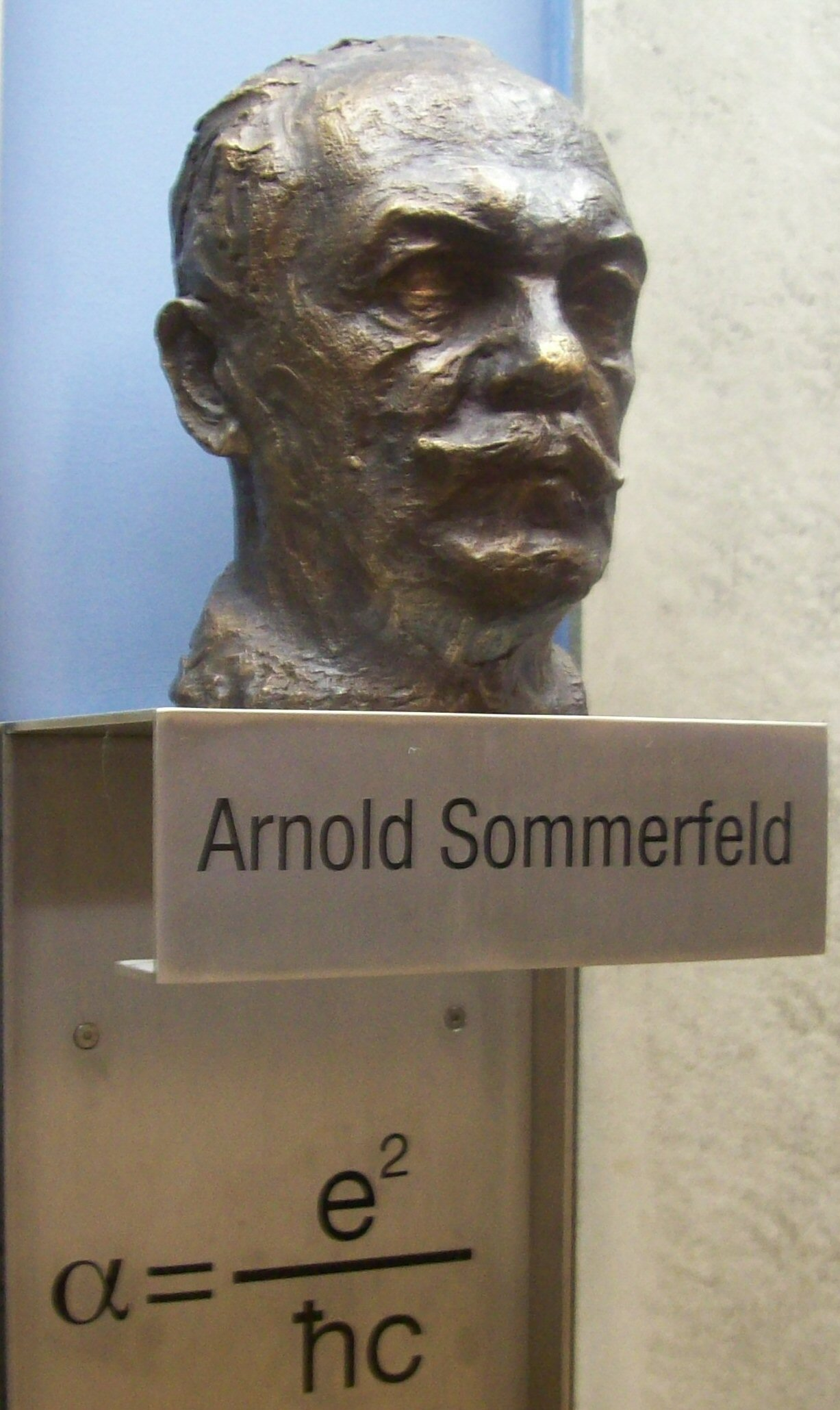
Arnold Sommerfeld introduced the fine-structure constant α in 1916, which became known as Sommerfeld's constant.

== Physics and mathematics ==
Arnold Sommerfeld was a German theoretical physicist whom the following is named after:

- Sommerfeld coefficient
- Sommerfeld constant (α)
- Sommerfeld expansion
- Sommerfeld effect
- Sommerfeld identity
- Sommerfeld number
- Sommerfeld parameter
- Sommerfeld radiation condition
- Sommerfeld's approximation
- Sommerfeld–Goubau line
- Sommerfeld–Kossel displacement law
- Sommerfeld–Runge method
- Sommerfeld–Watson representation
- Sommerfeld–Wilson ratio
- Sommerfeld–Zenneck surface wave
- Bohr–Sommerfeld model
  - Sommerfeld–Wilson quantization
- Drude–Sommerfeld model
- Gamow–Sommerfeld factor
- Grimm–Sommerfeld rule
- Orr–Sommerfeld equation
- Rayleigh–Sommerfeld diffraction theory

== Astronomical objects ==
- Sommerfeld crater
- 32809 Sommerfeld, minor planet
