= Adolf Kratzer =

German theoretical physicist (1893–1983)

B. Adolf Kratzer (16 October 1893 – 6 July 1983) was a German theoretical physicist who made contributions to atomic physics and molecular physics, and was an authority on molecular band spectroscopy. He was born in Günzburg and died in Münster.

From 1912 to 1914, Kratzer studied physics at the Technische Hochschule München, and then he spent two years in the army, after which he began studies at the Ludwig-Maximilians-Universität München under Arnold Sommerfeld. He was granted his doctor of philosophy in 1920; his thesis was on the band spectra of molecules. While at the Ludwig-Maximilians-Universität München, he was Sommerfeld’s assistant; he had been trained by Sommerfeld’s assistant and student Wilhelm Lenz to fill this role. There, Kratzer extended the theory of diatomic molecular spectroscopy by including anharmonic forces between the nuclei, which changed the oscillation frequencies. It was Sommerfeld’s practice to send some of his assistants to be personal assistants for physics to the mathematician David Hilbert, at the University of Göttingen. Kratzer was sent to the University of Göttingen from 1920 to 1921. Upon his return to the Ludwig-Maximilians-Universität München, he became a Privatdozent, and it was during this time that he became acquainted with Werner Heisenberg, also a student of Sommerfeld.

Based on his work at the Ludwig-Maximilians-Universität München, it was in 1922 that Kratzer's detailed analysis on the cyanide spectroscopic bands was published. His analysis resulted in the introduction of half-integral quantum numbers to account for molecular rotation. During 1922, he was also called as an ordinarius professor of theoretical physics to the University of Münster. Here, Kratzer made contributions to quantum mechanics and became a leading authority in the field of molecular band spectroscopy.

At this time, there were three centers of development for quantum mechanics and the interpretation of atomic and molecular structure, based on atomic and molecular spectroscopy, especially the Sommerfeld-Bohr model: the Theoretical Physics Institute at the Ludwig-Maximilians-Universität München, under Arnold Sommerfeld, the Institute of Theoretical Physics at the University of Göttingen, under Max Born, and the Institute of Theoretical Physics, under Niels Bohr. These three institutes effectively formed a consortium for the exchange of assistants and researchers. Furthermore, with Sommerfeld educating such capable physicists as Kratzer, and others, when they were called to other facilities, they effectively became extensions of Sommerfeld’s Institute of Theoretical Physics. This was the case with Kratzer when he went to the University of Münster, as was the case of Sommerfeld’s former student Paul Peter Ewald when he went to the Technische Hochschule Stuttgart.

Kratzer published a number of physics books, based on his lectures on electrodynamics, mechanics, optics, relativity, thermodynamics, and quantum mechanics (wave mechanics). A book on transcendental functions was written with Walter Franz, also a student of Sommerfeld.

The Kratzer potential, a central force in molecular physics, is named in his honor. A potential with the same name has also been used in nuclear physics, as it provides an exact solution of the Bohr hamiltonian.

== Books ==
- Kratzer, Adolf Thermodynamik (Aschendorf, 1947)
- Kratzer, Adolf Vorlesungen über Thermodynamik (Aschendorf, 1950) – Based on lectures given during the summer semester in 1947.
- Kratzer, Adolf Einführung in die Wellenmechanik (Aschendorf, 1954)
- Kratzer, Adolf Vorlesungen über Elektrodynamik (Aschendorf, 1955)
- Kratzer, Adolf Relativitätstheorie (Aschendorff, 1956)
- Kratzer, Adolf Vorlesungen über Optik (Aschendorf, 1959) – Based on lectures given during the summer semester in 1931, at the University of Münster.
- Kratzer, Adolf Vorlesungen über Thermodynamik (Aschendorf, 1960) – Based on lectures given during the summer semester in 1947.
- Kratzer, Adolf Vorlesungen über Mechanik (Aschendorf, 1960)
- Kratzer, Adolf and Walter Franz Transzendente Funktionen (Akadem. Verl.-Ges. Geest & Portig, 1960)
- Kratzer, Adolf Vorlesungen über Elektrodynamik (Aschendorf, 1961)
- Kratzer, Adolf Vorlesungen über Mechanik (Aschendorf, 1962)
- Kratzer, Adolf and Walter Franz Transzendente Funktionen (Akadem. Verl.-Ges. Geest & Portig, 1963)
