= Sommerfeld model =

The Sommerfeld model can refer to:

- Bohr–Sommerfeld model
- Drude–Sommerfeld model
