= Sommerfield =

Surname list

Sommerfield is the surname of the following people:

- Diane Sommerfield (1949–2001), American actress
- John Sommerfield (1908–1991), British writer and activist
- Rose Sommerfield (1847–1952), American teacher and activist
- William F. Sommerfield (1877–1937), American businessman and politician
- Charles M. Sommerfield, theoretical physicist and professor emeritus at Yale University

== See also ==
- Summerfield
- Sommerfeld
- Somerfield
