= Helmut Hönl =

German physicist

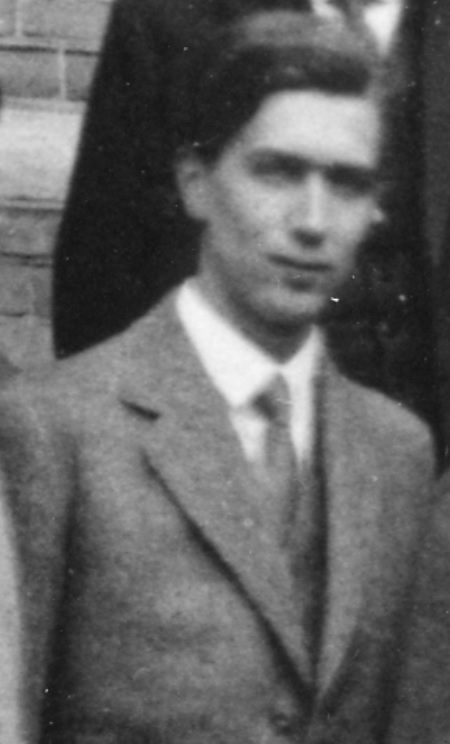
- Hönl in 1926
- Born: 10 February 1903; Mannheim, German Empire
- Died: 29 March 1981 (aged 78); Freiburg im Breisgau, Germany
- Education: Ludwig-Maximilians-Universität München (LMU)
- Scientific career
- Fields: Physics; Quantum mechanics
- Workplaces: Stuttgart Technische Hochschule; University of Erlangen; University of Freiburg
- Doctoral advisor: Arnold Sommerfeld

Helmut Hönl (10 February 1903– 29 March 1981) was a German theoretical physicist who made contributions to quantum mechanics and the understanding of atomic and molecular structure.

== Biography ==
Helmut Hönl was born in 1903 in Mannheim, German Empire.

From 1921 to circa 1923, Hönl studied at Heidelberg University and the University of Göttingen, followed by the Ludwig-Maximilians-Universität München, where he studied under Arnold Sommerfeld. He was granted his doctor of philosophy in 1926. In 1929, he became assistant to Paul Peter Ewald at the Stuttgart Technische Hochschule until 1933, after which he was a Privatdozent. In 1940 he became extraordinary professor at the University of Erlangen and 1943 ordinary professor for theoretical physics at the University of Freiburg, where he became emeritus in 1971.

== Research ==
Before acquiring his doctorate in Munich, Hönl performed seminal research which contributed to the advancement of quantum mechanics and the understanding of atomic and molecular structure and spectra. Some of his work was done in collaboration with Fritz London. Other researchers independently made similar findings as his work research the intensity of Zeeman effect spectral lines. Both Hönl and Samuel Goudsmit and Ralph de Laer Kronig published results in 1925. Their work was promptly put into use. In the first paper of the trilogy which launched the matrix mechanics formulation of quantum theory in 1925, Werner Heisenberg, a former student of Sommerfeld, working with Max Born at the University of Göttingen, used the work of Hönl, Kronig, and Goudsmit, referring to it as the “Goudsmit–Kronig–Hönl formula.”

At this time, there were three centers of development for quantum mechanics and the interpretation of atomic and molecular structure, based on atomic and molecular spectroscopy, especially the Sommerfeld-Bohr model: the Theoretical Physics Institute at the Ludwig-Maximilians-Universität München, under Sommerfeld, the Institute of Theoretical Physics at the University of Göttingen, under Born, and the Institute of Theoretical Physics, under Niels Bohr. These three institutes effectively formed a consortium for the exchange of assistants and researchers. Furthermore, with Sommerfeld educating such capable physicists, when they were called to other facilities, they effectively became extensions of Sommerfeld’s Institute of Theoretical Physics.

This was the case with Hönl when he went to the Stuttgart Technische Hochschule (STH) to work with Paul Peter Ewald, who received his Ph.D. under Sommerfeld and became ordinarius professor of theoretical physics at STH in 1921. At Stuttgart, Ewald and Hönl worked on the quantum theory atomic and molecular structure and solid-state physics. They developed a theoretical model of electron densities and the atomic scattering factor in solids. Their work has been referenced in the literature as the Ewald-Hönl-Brill model (after the German physicist Rudolf Brill).

== Selected literature ==
- Arnold Sommerfeld and Helmut Hönl Über die Intensität der Multiplett-Linien, Sitzungsberichte der Preußischen Akademie der Wissenschaften. Physikalisch-mathematische Klasse. 141-161 (1925) as cited in Arnold Sommerfeld Bibliography – Sommerfeld Project.
- Helmut Hönl “The intensity of Zeeman components” (Translated from the German) Zeitschrift für Physik 31 340-354 (1925)
- Helmut Hönl and Fritz London “The intensities of the band lines” (Translated from the German) Zeitschrift für Physik 33 803-809 (1925)
- Helmut Hönl “The intensity problem of spectral lines” (Translated from the German) Annalen der Physik 79 273-323 (1926)
- P. P. Ewald and H. Hönl "The x-ray interferences in diamond as a wave-mechanical problem. Part I." (English translation from the German) Annalen der Physik 25 (4): 281-308 (1936)
- P. P. Ewald and H. Hönl "X-ray interference in diamonds as problem of wave mechanics. Part II Analysis of linear atomic chains." (English translation from the German) Annalen der Physik 26 (8): 673-696 (1936)
