= Hedwig Kohn =

German-American physicist

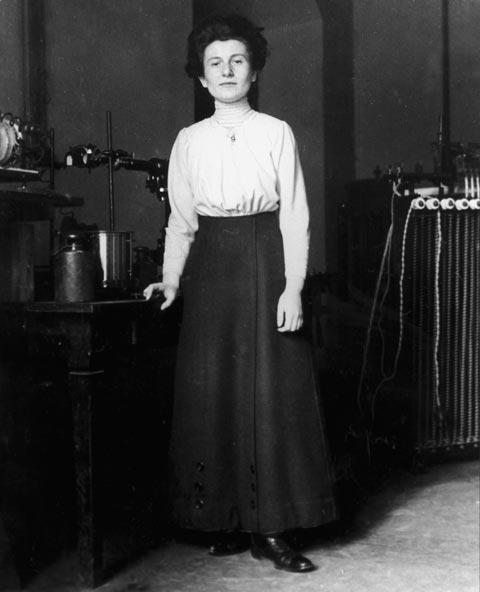
- Kohn in her laboratory, 1912.
- Born: 5 April 1887; Breslau, German Empire (now Wrocław, Poland)
- Died: 26 November 1964 (aged 77); Durham, North Carolina, U.S.
- Education: Breslau University
- Scientific career
- Fields: Physics
- Workplaces: Breslau University; University of North Carolina; Wellesley College; Duke University
- Thesis: (1913)
- Doctoral advisors: Otto Lummer, Rudolf Ladenburg

Hedwig Kohn (5 April 1887 – 26 November 1964) was a physicist who was one of only three women (along Lise Meitner and Hertha Sponer) to obtain habilitation (the qualification for university teaching) in physics in Germany before World War II. Born in Breslau in the German Empire (now Wrocław, Poland), she was forced to leave Germany during the Nazi regime because she was Jewish. She continued her academic career in the United States, where she settled for the rest of her life.

== Biography ==
=== Early life ===
Born in Breslau (now Wrocław, Poland), Kohn was the daughter of Georg Kohn, a wholesale merchant of fine cloth, and Helene Hancke, a member of a well-to-do family. Her parents were both German Jews.

In 1907, Kohn enrolled in Breslau University (Universität Breslau, now University of Wrocław), a year before women were officially allowed to matriculate. She became the second woman to enter the physics department. She obtained her doctorate in physics under Otto Lummer in 1913 and was soon appointed as Lummer's assistant. She stayed at the university's Physics Institute during World War I, teaching and advising doctoral students in spite of her youth, even receiving a medal for this service after the war. She obtained her habilitation in 1930.

Kohn was trained by Lummer in the quantitative determination of the intensity of light, both from broad-band sources, such as a "black body", and from the discrete emission lines of atoms and molecules.

=== Escape from Germany ===
Kohn was dismissed from her position in 1933 due to Nazi regulations which barred Jews from government service (the Law for the Restoration of the Professional Civil Service). In 1935, thanks to US funding, she was able to spend three months at the Licht-Klimatisches Observatory in Arosa, Switzerland, to measure the intensity of ultraviolet rays in the sun. However, this visit did not develop a permanent work. She survived by fulfilling contracts for applied research in the illumination industry until 1938, when she found herself without work or financial resources, and narrowly avoided becoming a victim of the Holocaust. Her only brother was deported to Kovno and murdered.

Although a good and respected physicist, she was not internationally famous. The hurdles to her obtaining a job offer out of Germany were enhanced by the lack of university positions in western countries during the Great Depression, her German nationality, her age and being a woman. In some cases, antisemitism may have been a usually unspoken factor.

Offered temporary positions at three women's colleges in the United States through the aid of Rudolf Ladenburg, Lise Meitner, Hertha Sponer, the American Association of University Women, and many others, Kohn left Germany. She had been given a visa to the United Kingdom in 1939, but it was cancelled because of World War II; she eventually secured a visa to travel to Sweden and immediately went there in July 1940.

On receiving a visa from the United States, she then moved there. The journey to her first position at the Women's College of the University of North Carolina in Greensboro took Kohn through Berlin, Stockholm, Leningrad, Moscow, Vladivostok, Yokohama, San Francisco, and Chicago.

=== Life in United States ===
When Kohn arrived in the United States in January 1941, she was seriously ill. After recovering, Kohn taught at the Women's College of the University of North Carolina at Greensboro for a year and a half.

In 1942, she began teaching at Wellesley College in Massachusetts. She started as a lecturer, became an associate professor in 1945, and then was awarded full professorship in 1948. Kohn established a research laboratory for flame spectroscopy while at the college.

She was a member of a number of professional associations in the United States, including the American Physical Society, the American Association of Physics Teachers, and Sigma Xi: The Scientific Research Honor Society.

Upon Kohn's retirement as professor in 1952, Hertha Sponer, then professor of physics at Duke University in Durham, North Carolina, offered her a position as a research associate. Kohn set up a laboratory at Duke University and resumed research, where she guided two graduate students to their doctorates and recruited two post-doctoral fellows to assist in her study of flame spectroscopy. She worked there until very shortly before her death in 1964.

== Research ==
Kohn was trained by Otto Lummer in the quantitative determination of the intensity of light, both from broad-band sources, such as a "black body", and from the discrete emission lines of atoms and molecules. She further developed such methods and devised ways of extracting information from intensity measurements and from emission line shapes. She wrote 270 pages in the leading physics text of the 1930s and 1940s in Germany, received one patent, and wrote numerous articles in scientific journals, some of which were still being cited into the 2000s. Kohn also published a textbook that was used to introduce students to radiometry well into the 1960s. Two of her students became professors in Germany.

== Honours ==
Kohn is one of the four subjects of Olivia Campbell's 2024 book Sisters in Science.

A Google Doodle on 5 April 2019 commemorated Kohn's 132nd birth anniversary.

== Published works ==
- Müller-Pouillets Lehrbuch der Physik. (II. Auflage), unter Mitwirkung zahlreicher Gelehrter herausgegeben von A. Eucken, O. Lummer (+), E. Wätzmann. In five volumes: I. Mechanik und Akustik; II. Lehre von der strahlenden Energie (Optik); III. Wärmelehre; IV. Elektizität und Magnetismus; V. Physik der Erde und des Kosmos (einschl. Relativitätstheorie). Braunschweig: 1925–1929. Band II, Zweite Hälfte, Erster Teil (Volume II, 2nd half, 1st part), volume editor Karl W. Meissner: 1929.
- Kohn, Hedwig (1929). "Photometrie". Band II (in German) (22): 1104–1320.
- Kohn, Hedwig (1929). "Temperaturbestimmung auf Grund von Strahlungsmessungen". Band II (in German) (25): 1428–1469.
- Kohn, Hedwig (1929). "Ziele und Grenzen der Lichttechnik". Band II (in German) (26): 1470–1482.
- Kohn, Hedwig (1932). Umkehrmessungen an Spektrallinien zur Bestimmung der Gesamtabsorption und der Besetzungszahlen angeregter Atomzustände (in German). Vol. 33. Phys. Zeitschrift. pp. 957–963.
