= Clara Ewald =

German painter (1859–1948)

- Born: Clara Pilippson; 22 October 1859; Düsseldorf, Kingdom of Prussia
- Died: 15 January 1948 (aged 87); Belfast, Ireland
- Known for: Painting

Clara Ewald (1859–1948) was a German artist known for her portraits.

== Biography ==
Ewald née Pilippson was born on 22 October 1859 in Düsseldorf, Kingdom of Prussia. She was a student of William-Adolphe Bouguereau, Otto Brausewetter, and Karl Gussow. After the death of her husband in 1909 Ewald settled in an artists' colony on Lake Ammer near Munich. In 1938 Ewald and her son, Peter moved to Cambridge, England. They moved again to Belfast, Ireland, when Peter took a job at Queen's University. Ewald died on 15 January 1948 in Belfast.

Ewald has portraits in the National Portrait Gallery, London, specifically a 1911 portrait of Rupert Brooke and a portrait of Albert Schweitzer from the 1930s. She has other works in British collections including a portrait of Paul Dirac at The Royal Society.

== Gallery ==
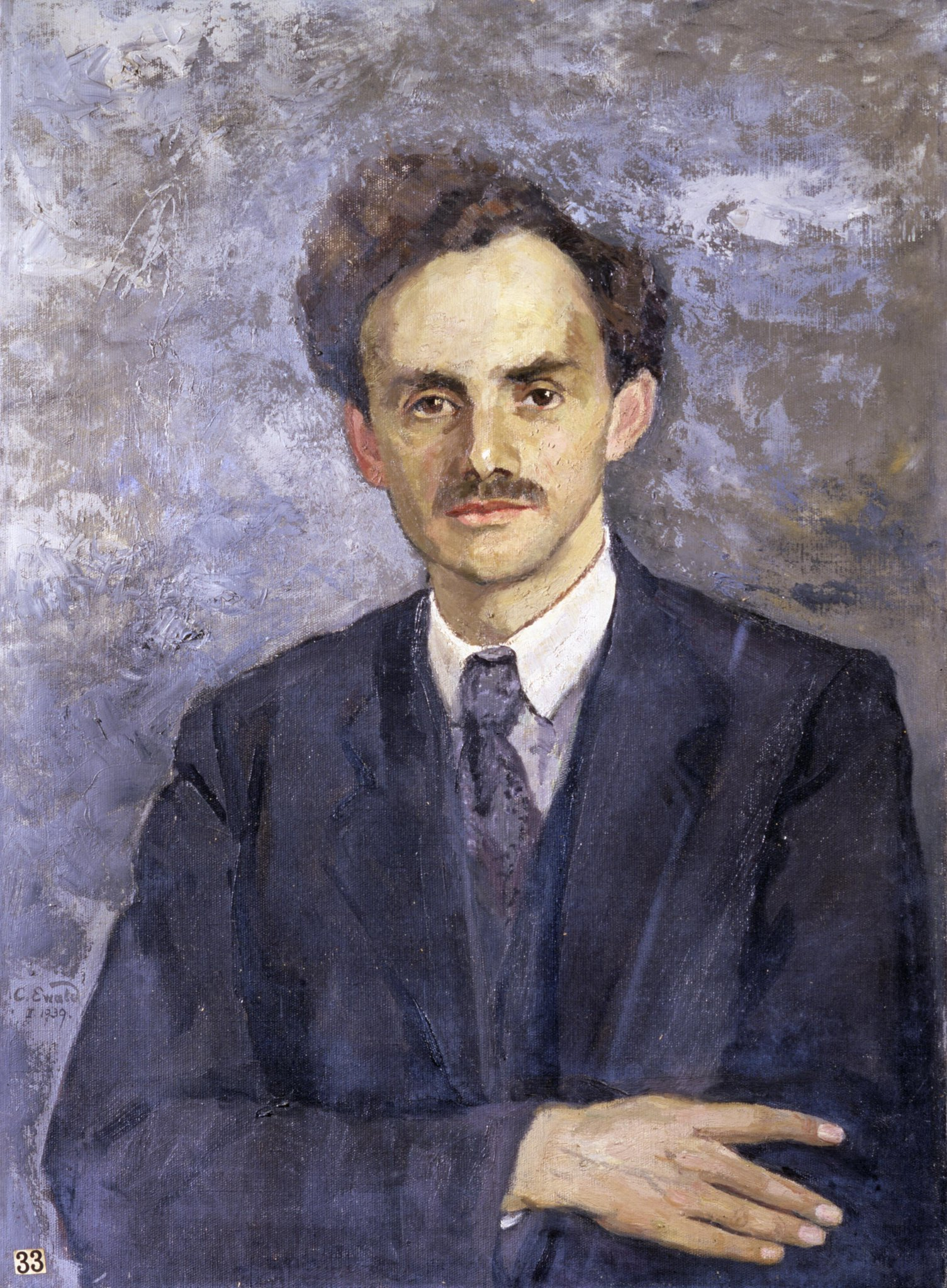
Paul Dirac

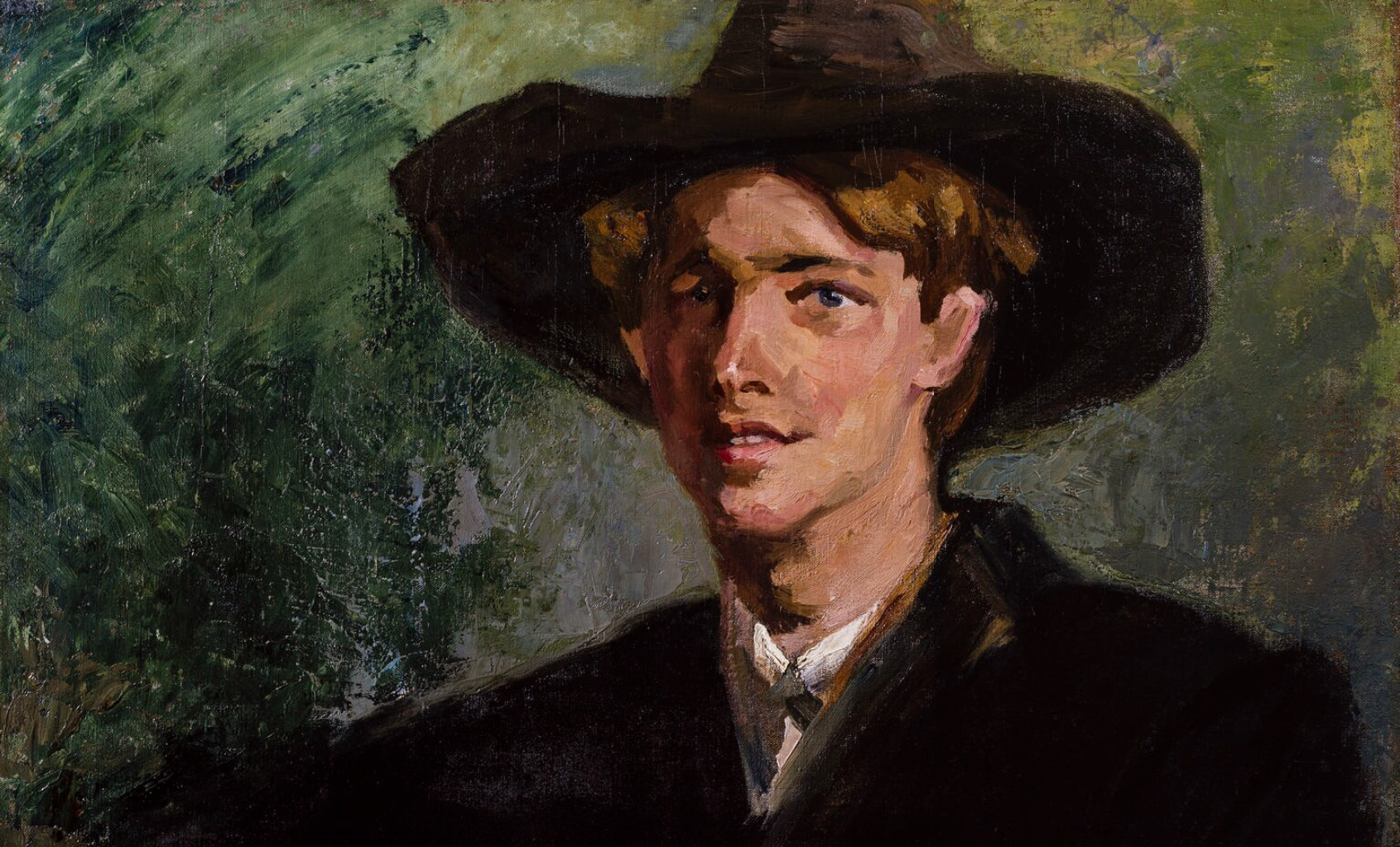
Rupert Brooke

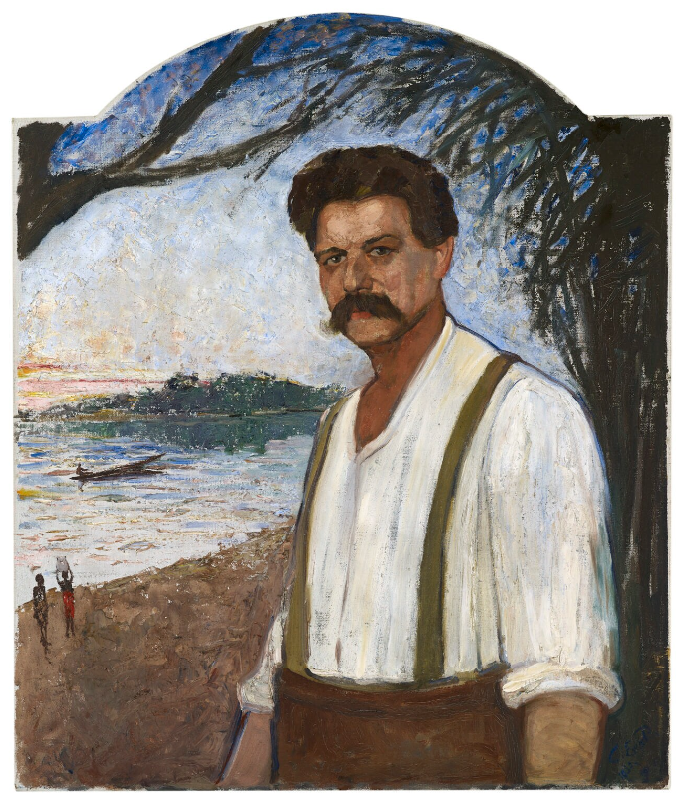
Albert Schweitzer
