= George Ernest Gibson =

American chemist (1884–1959)

- Born: November 9, 1884; Edinburgh, Scotland
- Died: August 26, 1959 (aged 74)
- Education: University of Edinburgh B.Sc. University of Breslau Ph.D
- Scientific career
- Fields: Nuclear chemist
- Thesis: (1911)
- Doctoral advisor: Otto Lummer
- Doctoral students: William Giauque; Glenn T. Seaborg; Wendell Mitchell Latimer; Joseph W. Kennedy

George Ernest Gibson (November 9, 1884 – August 26, 1959) was a Scottish-born American nuclear chemist.

== Early years ==
George Ernest Gibson was born in Edinburgh, Scotland and educated partly in Germany where he attended a gymnasium in Darmstadt, finishing his schooling in Edinburgh. He studied chemistry at the University of Edinburgh receiving his B.Sc. in 1906. He worked with Otto Lummer at the former University of Breslau (now University of Wrocław) where he received his Ph.D. in 1911, and stayed there as lecturer for two additional years before returning to the University of Edinburgh in 1912.

== Work ==
In 1913 he became professor at the University of California, Berkeley. Two of his students were awarded a Nobel Prize in Chemistry, William Giauque and Glenn T. Seaborg. In 1927 he stayed a year with Walter Heitler in Göttingen as a Guggenheim Fellow. He retired in 1954 and died in 1959.

== Honors ==
He was elected in 1923 a Fellow of the American Physical Society.
