= Otto Lummer =

German physicist and researcher (1860–1925)

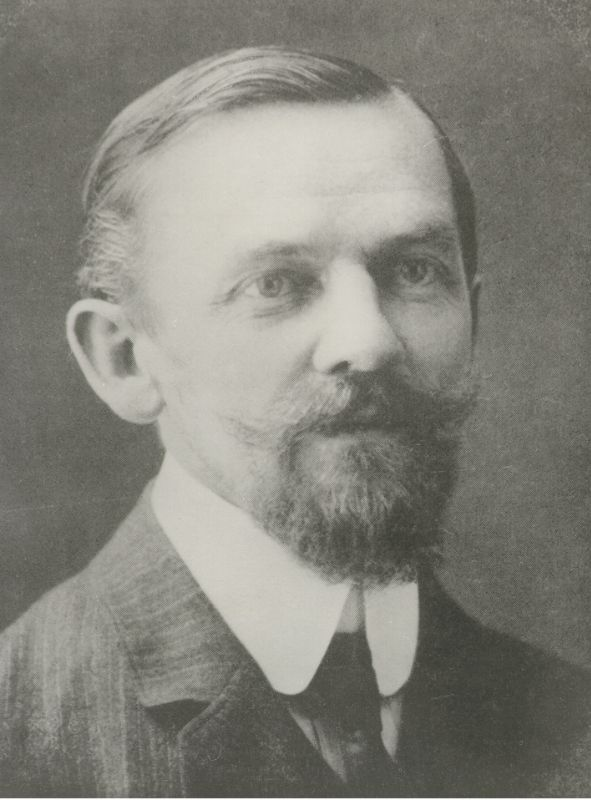
- Lummer in 1902
- Born: 17 July 1860; Gera, Principality of Reuss-Gera
- Died: 5 July 1925 (aged 64); Breslau, Weimar Republic (now Wrocław, Poland)
- Known for: Lummer–Gehrcke interferometer
- Scientific career
- Fields: Physics
- Doctoral advisor: Hermann von Helmholtz
- Doctoral students: George Ernest Gibson; Hedwig Kohn; Mieczysław Wolfke

Otto Richard Lummer (17 July 1860 – 5 July 1925) was a German physicist and researcher. He was born in the city of Gera, Germany. With Leon Arons, Lummer helped to design and build the Arons–Lummer mercury-vapor lamp. Lummer primarily worked in the field of optics and thermal radiation. Lummer's findings, along with others, on black body radiators led Max Planck to reconcile his earlier Planck's law of black-body radiation by introducing the quantum hypothesis in 1900. In 1903, with Ernst Gehrcke, he developed the Lummer–Gehrcke interferometer. Lummer died in former Breslau, now Wrocław.
