= Ernst Gehrcke =

German physicist (1878–1960)

Ernst J. L. Gehrcke (1 July 1878 in Berlin – 25 January 1960 in Hohen-Neuendorf) was a German experimental physicist. He was director of the optical department at the Reich Physical and Technical Institute. Concurrently, he was a professor at the University of Berlin. He developed the Lummer–Gehrcke method in interferometry and the multiplex interferometric spectroscope for precision resolution of spectral-line structures. As an anti-relativist, he was a speaker at an event organized in 1920 by the Working Society of German Scientists. He sat on the board of trustees of the Potsdam Astrophysical Observatory. After World War II, he worked at Carl Zeiss Jena, and he helped to develop and become the director of the Institute for Physiological Optics at the University of Jena. In 1949, he began work at the German Office for Materials and Product Testing. In 1953, he became the director of the optical department of the German Office for Weights and Measures.

== Education ==
Gehrcke studied at the Friedrich-Wilhelms-Universität (today, the Humboldt-Universität zu Berlin) from 1897 to 1901. He received his doctorate under Emil Warburg in 1901.

== Career ==
In 1901, Gehrcke joined the Physikalisch-Technische Reichsanstalt (PTR, Reich Physical and Technical Institute, after 1945 renamed the Physikalisch-Technische Bundesanstalt). In 1926, he became the director of the optical department, a position he held until 1946. Concurrent with his position at the PTR, he was a Privatdozent at the Friedrich-Wilhelms-Universität from 1904 to 1921 and an außerordentlicher Professor (extraordinarius professor) from 1921 to 1946. After the close of World War II, the university was in the Russian sector of Berlin.

In 1946, Gehrcke worked at Carl Zeiss AG in Jena, and he helped to develop and become the director of the Institute for Physiological Optics at the Friedrich-Schiller-Universität Jena. In 1949, he went to East Berlin to the Deutsches Amt für Materialprüfung (German Office for Materials and Product Testing). In 1953, he became the director of the optical department of the Deutsches Amt für Maß und Gewicht (DAMG, German Office for Weights and Measures) in East Berlin, the East German equivalent to the West German Physikalisch-Technische Bundesanstalt (Federal Physical and Technical Institute).

Gehrcke contributed to the experimental techniques of interference spectroscopy (interferometry), physiological optics, and the physics of electrical discharges in gases. In 1903, with Otto Lummer, he developed the Lummer–Gehrcke method in interferometry. In 1927, with Ernst Gustav Lau, he developed the multiplex interferometric spectroscope for precision resolution of spectral-line structures.

Like a number of other prominent physicists of the time (including the leading Dutch theoretician H. A. Lorentz) Gehrcke, an experimentalist, was not prepared to give up the concept of the luminiferous aether, and for this and various other reasons had been highly critical of Einstein's theories of relativity at least since 1911. This led to an invitation to an event organized in 1920 by Paul Weyland. Weyland, a radical political activist, professional agitator, small-time criminal, and editor of the vehemently anti-Semitic periodical Völkische Monatshefte, believed that Einstein's theories had been excessively promoted in the Berlin press, which he imagined was dominated by Jews who were sympathetic to Einstein's cause for other than scientific reasons. In response, Weyland organized the Arbeitsgemeinschaft deutscher Naturforscher zur Erhaltung reiner Wissenschaft (Working Group of German Natural Scientists for the Preservation of Pure Science), which was never officially registered. Weyland tried to enlist the support of some prominent conservative scientists, such as the Nobel Laureate Philipp Lenard, to build support for the Society (although Lenard declined to participate in Weyland's meetings). The Society held its first and only event on 24 August 1920, featuring lectures against Albert Einstein's theory of relativity. Weyland gave the first presentation in which he accused Einstein of being a plagiarizer. Gehrcke gave the second and last talks, in which he presented detailed criticisms of Einstein's theories. Einstein attended the event with Walther Nernst. Max von Laue, Walther Nernst, and Heinrich Rubens published a brief and dignified response to the event, in the leading Berlin daily Tägliche Rundschau, on 26 August. Einstein published his own somewhat lengthy reply on 27 August, which he later came to regret. Rising anti-Semitism and antipathy to recent trends in theoretical physics (especially with respect to the theory of relativity and quantum mechanics) were key motivational factors for the Deutsche Physik movement.

Under advice from some of his closest associates, Einstein later publicly challenged his critics to debate him in a more professional environment, and several of his scientific adversaries, including Gehrcke and Lenard, accepted. The ensuing debate took place at the 86th meeting of the German Society of Scientists and Physicians in Bad Nauheim on 20 September, chaired by Friedrich von Müller, with Hendrik Lorentz, Max Planck, and Hermann Weyl present. In this meeting Gehrcke pressed his criticism that Einstein's general theory of relativity now admitted superluminal velocities in rotating frames of reference, which the special theory of relativity had ruled out (see Criticism of the theory of relativity).

The physics Nobel Laureate Philipp Lenard suggested Gehrcke for the Nobel Prize in Physics in 1921.

From 1922 to 1925, Gehrcke was also a member of the Kuratorium (board of trustees) of the Potsdam Astrophysical Observatory. On 9 February 1922, Max Planck nominated Gehrcke, Max von Laue, G. Müller, Walther Nernst to sit on the Kuratorium, and they were installed by the Preußische Akademie der Wissenschaften (Prussian Academy of Sciences). Gehrcke represented the Physikalisch-Technische Reichsanstalt. During their appointment, they sat four times with Albert Einstein present. This was a surprising collaboration in view of what had happened just 18 months earlier at the gathering under the auspices of the Arbeitsgemeinschaft deutscher Naturforscher and the responses in the press by Einstein, Laue, and Nernst.

== Memberships ==
Gehrcke was a member of professional organizations, which included:

- Deutsche Physikalische Gesellschaft (German Physical Society)
- Berlin Society of Anthropology, Ethnology and Prehistory

== Literature by Gehrcke ==
- Ernst Gehrcke and Rudolf Seeliger Über das Leuchten der Gase unter dem Einfluss von Kathodenstrahlen, Verh. D. Deutsch. Phys. Ges. (2) 15, 534–539 (1912), cited in Mehra, Volume 1, Part 2, p. 776.
- Gehrcke, Ernst Die gegen die Relativitätstheorie erhobenen Einwände, Die Naturwissenschaften Volume 1, 62–66 (1913)
- Gehrcke, Ernst Zur Kritik und Geschichte der neueren Gravitationstheorien, Annalen der Physik Volume 51, Number 4, 119 – 124 (1916)
- Gehrcke, Ernst Berichtigung zum Dialog über die Relativitätstheorie, Die Naturwissenschaften Volume 7, 147 – 148 (1919)
- Gehrcke, Ernst Zur Diskussion über den Äther, Zeitschrift der Physik Volume 2, 67 – 68 (1920)
- Gehrcke, Ernst Wie die Energieverteilung der schwarzen Strahlung in Wirklichkeit gefunden wurde, Physikalische Zeitschrift Volume 37, 439 – 440 (1936)

== Books by Gehrcke ==
- Gehrcke, Ernst (editor) Handbuch der physikalischen Optik. In zwei Bänden (Barth, 1927–1928)

== Bibliography ==
- Beyerchen, Alan D. Scientists Under Hitler: Politics and the Physics Community in the Third Reich (Yale, 1977) ISBN 0-300-01830-4
- Einstein, Albert Meine Antwort. Über die anti-relativitätstheoretische G.M.b.H., Berliner Tageblatt Volume 49, Number 402, Morning Edition A, p. 1 (27 August 1920), translated and published as Document #1, Albert Einstein: My Reply. On the Anti-Relativity Theoretical Co., Ltd. [August 27, 1920] in Klaus Hentschel (editor) and Ann M. Hentschel (editorial assistant and translator) Physics and National Socialism: An Anthology of Primary Sources (Birkhäuser, 1996) pp. 1 – 5.
- Clark, Ronald W. Einstein: The Life and Times (World, 1971)
- Goenner, Hubert The Reaction to Relativity Theory I: The Anti-Einstein Campaign in Germany in 1920 pp. 107–136 in Mara Beller (editor), Robert S. Cohen (editor), and Jürgen Renn Einstein in Context (Cambridge, 1993) ISBN 0-521-44834-4 (paperback)
- Heilbron, J. L. The Dilemmas of an Upright Man: Max Planck and the Fortunes of German Science (Harvard, 2000) ISBN 0-674-00439-6
- Hentschel, Klaus (Editor) and Ann M. Hentschel (Editorial Assistant and Translator) Physics and National Socialism: An Anthology of Primary Sources (Birkhäuser, 1996)
- Mehra, Jagdish, and Helmut Rechenberg The Historical Development of Quantum Theory. Volume 1 Part 2 The Quantum Theory of Planck, Einstein, Bohr and Sommerfeld 1900 – 1925: Its Foundation and the Rise of Its Difficulties. (Springer, 2001) ISBN 0-387-95175-X
- van Dongen, Jeroen Reactionaries and Einstein’s Fame: “German Scientists for the Preservation of Pure Science,” Relativity, and the Bad Nauheim Meeting, Physics in Perspective Volume 9, Number 2, 212–230 (June, 2007). Institutional affiliations of the author: (1) Einstein Papers Project, California Institute of Technology, Pasadena, CA 91125, USA, and (2) Institute for History and Foundations of Science, Utrecht University, P.O. Box 80.000, 3508 TA Utrecht, The Netherlands.
