= Walter Franz =

German theoretical physicist

Walter Franz (8 April 1911, in Munich – 16 February 1992, in Münster) was a German theoretical physicist who independently discovered the Franz–Keldysh effect.

Franz was a student of Arnold Sommerfeld at the Ludwig-Maximilians-Universität München (LMU) in Germany. There he was granted the doctoral degree Dr.phil. in 1934. The (German) title of his dissertation was Comptoneffekt am gebundenen Elektron. In the preface to the book Optik, Sommerfeld cited him for "the most recent and particularly lucid treatment" of the vectorial generalization of Huygens’ principle.

With Adolf Kratzer, another student of Sommerfeld, Franz co-authored the book Transzendente Funktionen. The article in which Franz independently published the Franz–Keldysh effect was published in 1958.

== Selected bibliography ==
- Adolf Kratzer and Walter Franz, Transzendente Funktionen (Akadem. Verl.-Ges. Geest & Portig, 1960)
- W. Franz, Die Streuung von Strahlung am magnetischen Elektron, Annalen der Physik 425, Issue 8, 689-707 (1938)
- Walter Franz, Einfluß eines elektrischen Feldes auf eine optische Absorptionskante, Z. Naturforschung 13a, 484-489 (1958)
