= Erwin Fues =

German physicist (1893–1970)

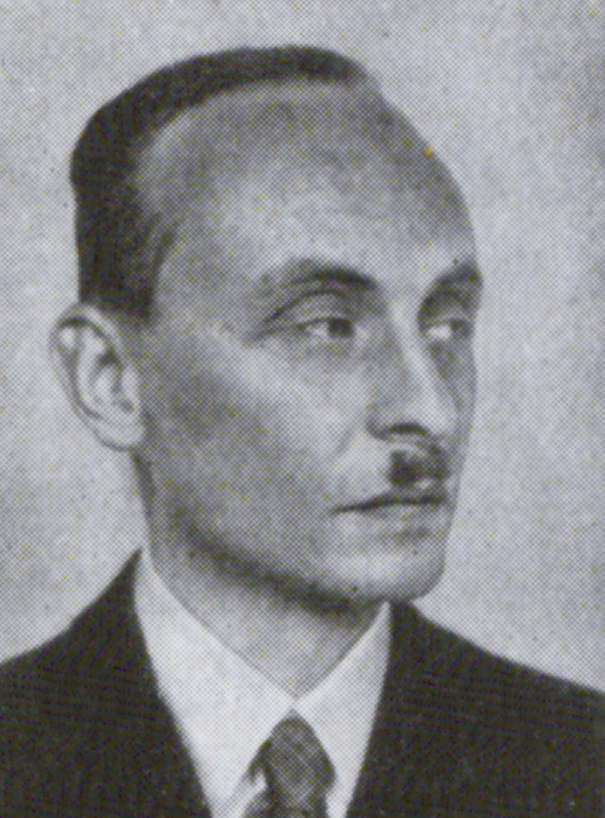
Erwin Fues

Erwin Richard Fues (17 January 1893 in Stuttgart, Germany – 17 January 1970, Germany), was a German theoretical physicist who made contributions to atomic physics and molecular physics, quantum wave mechanics, and solid-state physics.

== Education and career ==
During the period 1912 to 1914, Fues studied at the Friedrich Wilhelm University of Berlin and then the Ludwig-Maximilians-Universität München. He served in the military in 1914 to circa 1915, and then attended the University of Tübingen from 1916 to 1918. During 1918, he became a student of Arnold Sommerfeld and he received the doctor rerum naturalium from the Ludwig-Maximilians-Universität München in 1920. From 1922 he did postgraduate work at the Technische Hochschule Stuttgart, under Paul Peter Ewald, also a former student of Arnold Sommerfeld, and he completed his Habilitation in 1924. At the Technische Hochschule Stuttgart, he served as a Privatdozent and assistant to Ewald until 1929, during which time he worked on atomic and molecular structure and spectroscopy based on the Sommerfeld-Bohr theory. During his tenure under Ewald, he was absent from 1925 to 1927, when as an International Education Board fellow, he was first an assistant to Erwin Schrödinger at the University of Zurich, and then a research assistant at the University of Copenhagen at Niels Bohr's Institute of Theoretical Physics. At that time three major centers for the development of quantum mechanics were the Theoretical Physics Institute at the Ludwig-Maximilians-Universität München, under Arnold Sommerfeld, the Institute of Theoretical Physics at the University of Göttingen, under Max Born, and the Institute of Theoretical Physics, under Niels Bohr.

In 1933, Fues signed the Vow of allegiance of the Professors of the German Universities and High-Schools to Adolf Hitler and the National Socialistic State.

From 1929 to 1934, he served as ordinarius professor at the Hanover Technische Hochschule. From 1934 to 1943, he served as ordinarius professor jointly at the University of Breslau and the Technische Hochschule Breslau, after which, he went to the Technische Hochschule Wien, where he remained until 1947. In that year, he went back to the Technische Hochschule Stuttgart, where the Institute for Theoretical and Applied Physics (Institut für Theoretische und Angewandte Physik), had been formed from two chairs. Fues became ordinarius professor for theoretical physics as well as director of the institute; the other joint director was Ulrich Dehlinger. The institute followed the tradition of both Sommerfeld and Ewald in carrying on with both theoretical and experimental research and teaching.

After Sommerfeld's death in 1951, Fues edited and supplemented multiple editions of two volumes of Sommerfeld's six-volume Vorlesungen über theoretische Physik.

In his career, Fues made contributions to theoretical physics, especially in atomic structure, quantum wave mechanics, and solid-state physics. In 1960, Hermann Haken took over from Fues at the Institute for Theoretical and Applied Physics.

== Selected literature ==
- Erwin Fues Vergleich zwischen den Funkenspektren der Erdalkalien und den Bogenspektren der Alkalien, Ann. D. Phys (4) 63 1-27 (1920). Received 5 February 1920, published in issue No. 17 of 16 September 1920. As cited in Mehra, Volume 5, Part 2, 2001, p. 902.
- Erwin Fues Die Berechnung wasserstoffunähnlicher Spektren aus Zentralbewegungen der Elektronen. I., Z. Phys. 11 364-378 (1922). Received 2 October 1922, published in issue No. 6 of 30 November 1922. As cited in Mehra, Volume 5, Part 2, 2001, p. 902.
- Erwin Fues Die Berechnung wasserstoffunähnlicher Spektren aus Zentralbewegungen der Elektronen. II., Z. Phys. 12 1-12 (1922). Received 2 October 1922, published in issue No. 1 of 9 December 1922. As cited in Mehra, Volume 5, Part 2, 2001, p. 902.

== Edited books ==
- Sommerfeld, Arnold Vorlesungen über theoretische Physik. Band 2: Mechanik der deformierbaren Medien. 4. Auflage, ergänzt und bearbeitet von Erwin Fues. (Akademische Verlagsgesellschaft, 1957)
- Sommerfeld, Arnold Vorlesungen über theoretische Physik. Band 1: Mechanik. 6. Auflage, bearbeitet und ergänzt von Erwin Fues. (Akademische Verlagsgesellschaft, 1962)
- Sommerfeld, Arnold Vorlesungen über theoretische Physik. Band 1: Mechanik. 7. Auflage, bearbeitet und ergänzt von Erwin Fues. (Akademische Verlagsgesellschaft, 1964)
- Sommerfeld, Arnold Vorlesungen über theoretische Physik. Band 2: Mechanik der deformierbaren Medien. 5. Auflage, ergänzt und bearbeitet von Erwin Fues. (Akademische Verlagsgesellschaft, 1964)
- Sommerfeld, Arnold Vorlesungen über theoretische Physik. Band 1: Mechanik. 8. Auflage, bearbeitet und ergänzt von Erwin Fues. (Akademische Verlagsgesellschaft, 1968)
