= Rudolf Seeliger =

German physicist

- Born: November 12, 1886
- Died: January 20, 1965 (aged 78)
- Education: University of Tübingen; Heidelberg University; Ludwig-Maximilians-Universität München
- Scientific career
- Fields: Plasma physics
- Workplaces: Friedrich Wilhelm University of Berlin; University of Greifswald

Rudolf Seeliger (12 November 1886 – 20 January 1965) was a German physicist who specialized in electric discharges in gases and plasma physics.

From 1906 to 1909, Seeliger studied at the University of Tübingen and Heidelberg University. He then became a student of Arnold Sommerfeld at the Ludwig-Maximilians-Universität München, where he got his doctorate in 1910. The topic of his thesis, the physics of electrical currents in gas, set the theme for his life’s field of research. He then went to conduct postgraduate research, on the same topic, at the Physikalisch-Technische Reichsanstalt (PTR) in Berlin. In 1915, he was also a Privatdozent at the Friedrich Wilhelm University of Berlin. In 1918, he was called by Johannes Stark, Director of the Institute of Physics at the University of Greifswald, to be extraordinarius professor there. In 1921, Seeliger took the position of ordinarius professor for theoretical physics at the university. He became Director of the Institute of Physics in 1940, and was succeeded in 1955, by Walter Schallreuter, who had been a co-author with Seeliger on a physics textbook series.

In collaboration with Ernst Gehrcke at the PTR, Seeliger continued his research on electrical discharges in gases. In the spring of 1912, Gehrcke and Seeliger determined that light from cathode rays (electron beams) passing through gases, such as nitrogen and mercury vapor, became longer in wavelength, as the velocity of the cathode rays were slowed, i.e., becoming lower in energy. These results, through experiments in 1912 and 1913, were clarified and interpreted, by James Franck and Gustav Hertz, nephew of Heinrich Hertz; for their discovery of the laws governing the impact of an electron upon an atom, Franck and Hertz were awarded the Nobel Prize in 1925.

In 1946, Paul Schulz founded the Forschungsstelle für Gasentladungsphysik (Research Center for Gas Discharge Physics) under the Academy of Sciences. When Schulz left in 1949, Seeliger became director. In 1950, the center was renamed the Institut für Gasentladungsphysik (Institute for Gas Discharge Physics). In 1969, the institute was reassigned to the Zentralinstitut für Elektronenphysik (Central Institute of Electron Physics). On 31 December 1991 the Institut für Gasentladungsphysik was dissolved and reopened the next day as the Institut für Niedertemperatur-Plasmaphysik e.V. and became part of the Gottfried Wilhelm Leibniz Scientific Community.

From 1946 to 1948, Seeliger was Rector of the University of Greifswald.

== Books ==
- Rudolf Seeliger Einführung in die Physik der Gasentladungen (Barth, 1927)
- Rudolf Seeliger and Geog Mierdel Allgemeine Eigenschaften der selbständigen Entladungen, die Bogenentladung (Akademische Verlagsgesellschaft m. b. h., 1929)
- Rudolf Seeliger Angewandte Atomphysik; eine Einführung in die theoretischen Grundlagen (Springer, 1938 and 1944)
- Rudolf Seeliger Die Grundbeziehungen der neuen Physik (Barth, 1948)
- Carl Ernst Heinrich Grimsehl, Walter Schallreuter, and Rudolf Seeliger Lehrbuch der Physik. Bd. 1. Mechanik, Wärmelehre, Akustik (Teubner, 1951, 1954, 1955, 1957, 1962, and 1971)
- Carl Ernst Heinrich Grimsehl, Walter Schallreuter, and Rudolf Seeliger Lehrbuch der Physik. Bd. 2. Elektromagnetisches Feld (Teubner, 1951, 1954, 1959, 1961, 1963, and 1967)
- Carl Ernst Heinrich Grimsehl, Walter Schallreuter, and Rudolf Seeliger Lehrbuch der Physik. Bd. 3. Optik (Teubner, 1952, 1955, 1962, and 1969)
- Carl Ernst Heinrich Grimsehl, Walter Schallreuter, and Rudolf Seeliger Lehrbuch der Physik. Bd. 4. Struktur der Materie (Teubner, 1959 and 1968)
