= Ludwig Hopf =

German physicist (1884–1939)

- Born: 23 October 1884; Nuremberg, German Empire
- Died: 23 December 1939 (aged 55); Dublin, Ireland
- Citizenship: German; Swiss
- Education: Ludwig-Maximilians-Universität München (PhD)
- Known for: Einstein–Hopf Drag
- Spouse: Alice Goldschmidt
- Children: 5 sons and a daughter
- Parent(s): Hans Hopf and Elise (née Josephthal)
- Relatives: Heinz Hopf (first cousin); Franz Reizenstein (first cousin, once removed)
- Scientific career
- Fields: mathematics, special relativity, hydrodynamics, aerodynamics and psychoanalysis
- Workplaces: University of Zurich; Karl-Ferdinand University in Prague; Trinity College, Dublin
- Thesis: "Introduction to the Differential Equations of Physics" "Aerodynamik" "Die Relativitätstheorie"
- Doctoral advisor: Arnold Sommerfeld
- Other academic advisors: Albert Einstein

Ludwig Hopf (23 October 1884 in Nuremberg, Germany – 23 December 1939 in Dublin) was a German-Jewish theoretical physicist who made contributions to mathematics, special relativity, hydrodynamics, and aerodynamics. Early in his career he was the assistant to and a collaborator and co-author with Albert Einstein.

== Biography ==
Hopf was born into a family of prominent hops merchants and municipal counselors in Nuremberg, Germany, the son of Elise (née Josephthal) and Hans Hopf. From 1902 until 1909, he studied math and physics at the Ludwig-Maximilians-Universität München and the Friedrich Wilhelm University of Berlin.

Hopf studied under Arnold Sommerfeld at the Ludwig-Maximilians-Universität München, where he received his Ph.D. in 1909, on the topic of hydrodynamics. Shortly after this, Sommerfeld introduced Hopf to Albert Einstein at a physics conference in Salzburg. Later that year, Einstein, needing an assistant at the University of Zurich, hired Hopf; it was an added bonus that Hopf was a talented pianist, since Einstein played the violin and liked to play duets. Hopf was an ardent fan of psychoanalysis, had studied Freud and, once in Zurich, attached himself to Freud's ex-disciple Carl Jung. Hopf introduced Einstein to Jung, and Einstein returned to Jung's house several times over the years. In 1910, Hopf collaborated and published with Einstein two papers on classical statistical aspects of radiation. Hopf's collaboration with Sommerfeld on integral representations of Bessel Functions resulted in the publication of a paper in 1911. Also in that year, Hopf accompanied Einstein to the Karl-Ferdinand University in Prague; however, he did not stay with Einstein long – due to "unsanitary conditions" in Prague.

In 1912, Hopf married Alice Goldschmidt, with whom he had five sons and a daughter.

During World War I, Hopf contributed to the design of military aircraft. In 1921, he accepted a position at the Rheinisch-Westfälische Technische Hochschule Aachen (RWTH Aachen University), a leading technical university in Germany, where he eventually became a professor in hydrodynamics and aerodynamics. It was during his tenure at Aachen that he made a contribution to the Handbuch der Physik and co-authored a "highly esteemed" book on aerodynamics.

In 1933, with the Nazis coming to power in Germany, Hopf was put on leave at Aachen due to his being a Jew, and in 1934 lost his position entirely.

Hopf remained in Germany until 1939 and escaped the Nazi regime only at the last minute. The SS was seeking to arrest him and were thwarted by his son Arnold posing as his father. Arnold was arrested and sent to the Buchenwald concentration camp, from which he was able to escape after three to four weeks and immigrate to Kenya. Ludwig left Germany for Great Britain with his wife and three of his children, taking a research position at Cambridge. He moved to Dublin in July 1939 to assume a professorship of mathematics at Trinity College.

Shortly after taking up his duties at Trinity, Hopf became seriously ill and died of thyroid failure on 21 December 1939. At his graveside, Schrödinger called Hopf "a friend to the greatest geniuses of his time," then adding "Indeed, he was one of them."

Hopf was first cousins with mathematician Heinz Hopf and first cousins once removed with composer Franz Reizenstein.

== Books ==
- Ludwig Hopf, Introduction to the Differential Equations of Physics. Translated by Walter Nef. New York: Dover Publications, 1948. (originally published by Walter de Gruyter, 1933).
- Richard Fuchs and Ludwig Hopf, Aerodynamik. Nabu Press (2011). (Originally published by Richard Carl Schmidt & Co., 1922)
- Ludwig Hopf, Die Relativitätstheorie. (Springer, 1931)

== See also ==
- Einstein–Hopf Drag

== Notes and sources ==
Notes

Sources

- Holfter, Gisela and Dickel, Horst (2017). An Irish Sanctuary: German-Speaking Refugees in Ireland 1933-1945 De Gruyter, Oldenburg ISBN 3110395754
- Brian, Denis Einstein: A Life (Wiley, 1996) ISBN 0-471-11459-6
- Clark, Ronald W. Einstein: The Life and Times (World, 1971)
- Albert Einstein and Ludwig Hopf (1910). "Über einen Satz der Wahscheinlichkeitsrechung und seine Anwendung in der Strahlungstheorie". Ann. Phys. 33 (1096). Leipzig.
- A. Einstein and L. Hopf (1910). "Statistische Untersuchung der Bewegung eines Resonators in einem Strahlungsfeld". Ann. Phys. 33 (1105). Leipzig.
- Moore, Walter Schrödinger: Life and Thought (Cambridge, 1992) ISBN 0-521-43767-9
- Pais, Abraham ’Subtle is the Lord…’ The Science and the Life of Albert Einstein (Clarendon, 1982) ISBN 0-19-853907-X
