= Einstein–Hopf drag =

Velocity-dependent drag force

In physics, the Einstein–Hopf drag (named after Albert Einstein and Ludwig Hopf) is a velocity-dependent drag force upon charged particles that are being bathed in thermal radiation.
