= Lummer–Gehrcke interferometer =

Multiple-beam interferometer

The Lummer–Gehrcke interferometer or Lummer–Gehrcke plate is a multiple-beam interferometer similar to the Fabry–Pérot etalon, but using light at a steep angle of incidence. The interferometer consists of a long plate of glass or quartz, with faces that are polished accurately flat and parallel. Light bounces back and forth inside the plate, striking the faces at an angle just below the critical angle as it propagates along.

Because of the steep angle of incidence, nearly all of the light is reflected, but a tiny fraction leaks out on each bounce. As in a Fabry–Pérot interferometer, the light that leaks out has phase that depends on how many times it has bounced inside the plate. A lens is used to overlap light that has emerged after varying numbers of bounces, producing an interference pattern. A key difference from a Fabry–Pérot etalon is that input light that reflects from the surface of the plate does not contribute to the interference.

Lummer–Gehrcke interferometers are now rarely used, having been largely replaced by Fabry–Pérot interferometers using modern dielectric reflective coatings.

== See also ==
- Ernst Gehrcke
- Otto Lummer
