= Wendell Mitchell Latimer =

American chemist

- Born: April 22, 1893; Garnett, Kansas, U.S.
- Died: July 6, 1955 (aged 62)
- Education: University of Kansas (B.A., 1915); University of California, Berkeley (PhD, 1919)
- Known for: Latimer diagram
- Awards: member, National Academy of Sciences; William H. Nichols Medal (1955)
- Scientific career
- Fields: Chemistry
- Workplaces: University of California, Berkeley
- Thesis: Entropy Changes at Low Temperatures. Formic Acid and Urea (1919)
- Doctoral advisor: George Ernest Gibson
- Other academic advisors: H. P. Cady
- Doctoral students: Kenneth Pitzer
- Other notable students: Willard F. Libby

Wendell Mitchell Latimer (April 22, 1893 – July 6, 1955) was an American chemist known for the discovery of tritium and his description of oxidation states in the book The Oxidation States of the Elements and Their Potentials in Aqueous Solution.

He received his PhD from the University of California, Berkeley, for the work with George Ernest Gibson.

== Awards and honors ==
Latimer received many awards and honor during his lifetime, including membership in the National Academy of Sciences, and chairmanship of its Section of Chemistry from 1947 to 1950; the Distinguished Service Award from his alma mater, the University of Kansas, in 1948; the President's Certificate of Merit, in 1948; Faculty Research Lecture in 1953, an honor that the Academic Senate of the University of California annually bestows upon one of its members; the William H. Nichols Medal from the New York Section of the American Chemical Society, in 1955 with a citation for his "Pioneer Studies on the Thermodynamics of Electrolytes, especially the Entropies of Ions in Aqueous Solutions."

== Discovery of tritium ==
In 1933 Latimer used the recently discovered Allison effect to discover tritium. Gilbert N. Lewis bet against his discovery, and he had to pay when Latimer showed him his data. However, that same year the Allison effect was discredited in the eyes of the scientific community, and the discovery of tritium was credited to Ernest Rutherford in 1934. Latimer explained years later he had been unable to reproduce his results, and he couldn't even find where he had gone wrong. The events were cited by Irving Langmuir in his 1953 speech about pathological science.

== Publications ==
- The Oxidation States of the Elements and Their Potentials in Aqueous Solution ASIN B000GRXLSA published 1938.
