= William Giauque =

Canadian-born American chemist (1895–1982)

- Giauque in 1949
- Born: William Francis Giauque; May 12, 1895; Niagara Falls, Ontario, Canada
- Died: March 28, 1982 (aged 86); Berkeley, California, US
- Education: University of California, Berkeley (BS, PhD)
- Awards: Elliott Cresson Medal (1937); Nobel Prize for Chemistry (1949); Willard Gibbs Award (1951)
- Scientific career
- Fields: Physical chemistry
- Workplaces: University of California, Berkeley
- Doctoral advisor: George Ernest Gibson
- Doctoral students: Theodore H. Geballe

William Francis Giauque (/dʒiˈoʊk/; May 12, 1895 – March 28, 1982) was a Canadian-born American chemist and Nobel laureate. He was recognized in 1949, for his studies in the properties of matter, at temperatures close to absolute zero. He spent virtually all of his educational and professional career at the University of California, Berkeley.

== Biography ==
William Francis Giauque was born in Niagara Falls, Ontario, on May 12, 1895.

His father (William Tecumseh Giauque) was an American citizen, and so William Francis Giauque was conferred American citizenship, despite being born in Canada,

In 1926, he proposed a method for observing temperatures considerably below 1 Kelvin (1 K is −457.87 °F or −272.15 °C). He developed a magnetic refrigeration device of his own design in order to achieve this outcome, getting closer to absolute zero than many scientists had thought possible. This trailblazing work, apart from proving one of the fundamental laws of nature led to stronger steel, better gasoline and more efficient processes in a range of industries.

Giauque was elected a member of the United States National Academy of Sciences in 1936, a member of the American Philosophical Society in 1940, and the American Academy of Arts and Sciences in 1950.

=== Personal life ===
In 1932, Giauque married Dr. Muriel Frances Ashley and they had two sons. He died on March 28, 1982, in Berkeley, California.
