= Walther Kossel =

German theoretical physicist (1888–1956)

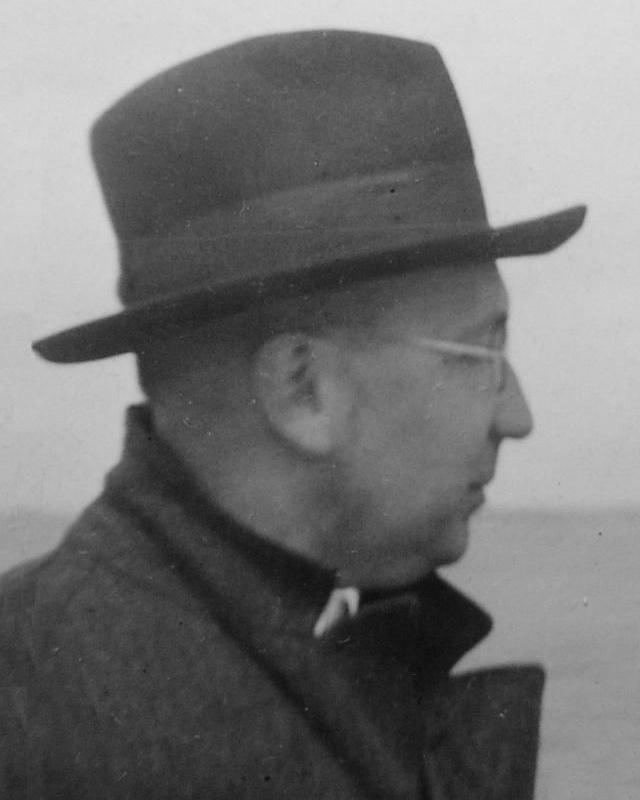
- Kossel in 1928
- Born: Walther Ludwig Julius Kossel; 4 January 1888; Berlin, German Empire
- Died: 22 May 1956 (aged 68); Tübingen, Baden-Württemberg, West Germany
- Education: Heidelberg University (Dr. phil.)
- Known for: Sommerfeld–Kossel displacement law (1919); Kossel–Stranski model (1927)
- Father: Albrecht Kossel
- Awards: Max Planck Medal (1944)
- Scientific career
- Fields: Atomic physics
- Workplaces: Kiel University (1921–32); Technische Hochschule Danzig (1932–45); University of Tübingen (1945–53)
- Thesis: Über die sekundäre Kathodenstrahlung in Gasen in der Nähe des Optimums der Primärgeschwindigkeit (1911)
- Doctoral advisor: Philipp Lenard
- Doctoral students: Christian Gerthsen (1929); Max Steenbeck (1929)

Walther Ludwig Julius Kossel (German: [ˈvaltɐ ˈkɔsl̩]; 4 January 1888 – 22 May 1956) was a German theoretical physicist known for his theory of the chemical bond (ionic bond/octet rule), the Sommerfeld–Kossel displacement law of atomic spectra, and the Kossel–Stranski model for crystal growth.

== Education and research ==
Walther Ludwig Julius Kossel was born on 4 January 1888 in Berlin, Germany, the son of biochemist and Nobel laureate Albrecht Kossel. In 1910, he became an assistant to Philipp Lenard at Heidelberg University. The following year, he received his Ph.D., and remained at Heidelberg University until 1913.

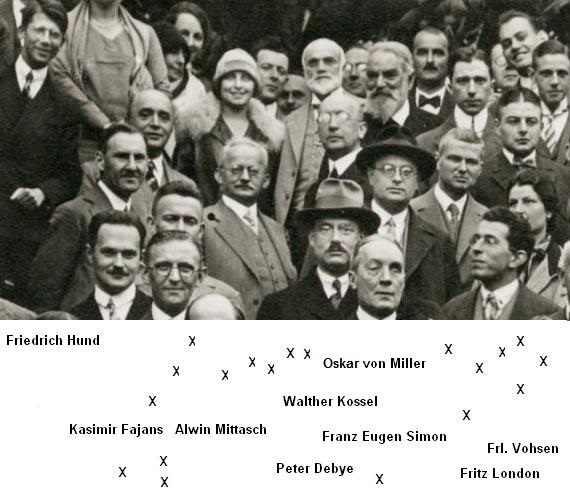
Walther Kossel (midst), May 1928 at Munich

In 1913, the year in which Niels Bohr introduced the Bohr model of the atom, Kossel went to the Ludwig-Maximilians-Universität München as an assistant to Arnold Sommerfeld, under whom he did his habilitation. Under Sommerfeld, Munich was a theoretical center for the developing atomic theory, especially from the interpretation of atomic spectra. Kossel worked with Bohr and Sommerfeld on the Bohr–Sommerfeld model.

In 1916, Kossel put forth his theory of the ionic chemical bond (octet rule), also independently advanced in the same year by Gilbert N. Lewis. In papers published in 1914, 1916, and 1920, Kossel was the first to explain the theory of absorption limits in X-ray spectra. The edge appears at a critical frequency where absorption of the radiation largely begins with the resultant ejection of photoelectrons. In 1919, Kossel and Sommerfeld explained the similarity of the atomic spectra of neutral atoms, of atomic number Z, and singly ionized atoms, of atomic number Z + 1, which became known as the Sommerfeld–Kossel displacement law. In 1920, he explained another phenomenon of X-ray spectra. Under high resolution spectroscopy, the absorption edge has structure. He attributed this to absorption of radiation by electrons which are not ejected from matter as photoelectrons, but are “kicked up” to higher, unoccupied, bound electron energy levels. In early years, this was known as “Kossel structure”.

== Career ==
In 1921, Kossel was appointed Ordinarius Professor of Theoretical Physics at Kiel University. In 1928, he put forth his kinetic theory of crystal growth, which became known as the terrace ledge kink model – Iwan N. Stranski (also known as Kossel–Stranski model) independently proposed the same model.

In 1932, Kossel took the appointment as Ordinarius Professor of Theoretical Physics at Technische Hochschule Danzig. During his tenure there in 1934, he discovered X-ray lattice interference of spherical waves in crystals during the bombardment of single-crystal copper with a high-energy electron beam.

In 1933, he signed the Vow of allegiance of the Professors of the German Universities and High-Schools to Adolf Hitler and the National Socialistic State.

In 1944, he was awarded the Max-Planck medal by the Deutsche Physikalische Gesellschaft.

In 1945, Kossel became Professor of Theoretical Physics and Director of the Physics Institute at the University of Tübingen, a position he held until his retirement in 1953.

Kossel died on 22 May 1956 in Tübingen at the age of 68. He is buried, as is his father Albrecht, at the Bergfriedhof in Heidelberg.

== Selected publications ==
- Walther Kossel Bemerkung zur Absorption homogener Röntgenstrahlen, Verh. D. Deutsch. Phys Ges (2) 16 898-909 (1914). Received 27 September 1914, published in issue No. 20 of 30 October 1914. As cited in Mehra, Volume 1, Part 2, 2001, p. 795.
- Walther Kossel Bemerkung zur Absorption homogener Röntgenstrahlen. II, Verh. D. Deutsch. Phys Ges (2) 16 953-963 (1914). Received 23 October 1914, published in issue No. 22 of 30 November 1914. As cited in Mehra, Volume 5, Part 2, 2001, p. 919.
- Walther Kossel Bemerkung zum Seriencharakter der Röntgenstrahlen, Verh. D. Deutsch. Phys Ges (2) 18 339-359 (1916). Received 31 August 1916, published in issue No. 15-18 of 30 September 1916. As cited in Mehra, Volume 5, Part 2, 2001, p. 919.
- Walther Kossel, “Uber Molkulbildung als Frage der Atombau”, Ann. Phys., 1916, 49:229-362.
