= Summerfield (surname) =

Summerfield is an English surname. Notable people with the surname include:

- Adam Summerfield (born 1990), British professional ice hockey goaltender
- Arthur Summerfield (1899–1972), American politician
- Derek Summerfield, British psychiatrist
- Eleanor Summerfield (1921–2001), British actress
- Kevin Summerfield (born 1959), English football coach
- Luke Summerfield (born 1987), English footballer
- Martin Summerfield (1916–1996), American rocket scientist
- Paddy Summerfield (1947–2024), professional photographer
- Paddy Summerfield (artist) (1929–2025), British artist
- Rob Summerfield (born 1980), American politician
- Rose Summerfield (1864–1922), Australian feminist

Fictional characters:

- Bernice Summerfield, character in novels and audio plays based on the television series Doctor Who
