= Karl Meissner =

German-American physicist (1891–1959)

- Born: December 15, 1891; Reutlingen, German Empire
- Died: 13 April 1959 (aged 67); En route to Europe
- Education: University of Tübingen; Ludwig-Maximilians-Universität München
- Scientific career
- Fields: Spectroscopy
- Workplaces: Purdue University; Worcester Polytechnic Institute; Goethe University Frankfurt; University of Zurich
- Doctoral advisor: Arnold Sommerfeld
- Other academic advisors: Friedrich Paschen; Wilhelm Röntgen

Karl Wilhelm Meissner (15 December 1891 in Reutlingen, Württemberg – 13 April 1959 on a cruise ship sailing to Europe) was a German-American physicist specializing in hyperfine spectroscopy. He spent the greater part of his career in the United States at Purdue University, in West Lafayette, Indiana.

== Education ==
After Meissner’s abitur at the Humanistisches Gymnasium, in 1910, he began the study of physics and mathematics at the University of Tübingen. After three terms, he went to the Ludwig-Maximilians-Universität München as a student of the experimentalist Wilhelm Röntgen and the theoretician Arnold Sommerfeld. After one year at the Ludwig-Maximilians-Universität München, he returned to the University of Tübingen to be able to study spectroscopy with Friedrich Paschen. While still a student in 1914, Meissner was able to prove the existence of oxygen lines in the solar spectrum. He was awarded his doctorate in 1915, on a thesis with the title Interferometrische Wellenlängenbestimmung im infraroten Spektralbereich. In 1916, he became an assistant to Edgar Meyer at the University of Zurich, under whom he completed his Habilitation, in 1918, with the Habilitationsschrift title Untersuchungen des Neonspektrums. The following year, he married the Polish physicist Doctor Janka Kohn.

== Career ==
In the summer of 1924, Meissner became a First Assistant at the Physics Institute of the University of Zurich. Here he studied the spectra of indium, gallium, neon, argon, and caesium, the arc spectrum of lead (spectrum of neutral or non-ionized lead), the Stark effect of neon, and general problems of detecting radiation.

The change from Zurich to Goethe University Frankfurt occurred in 1925. Meissner was appointed extraordinarius professor of physics there, when Walter Gerlach left for the University of Tübingen. Shortly thereafter, he received calls to the Donro Institute at Davos and the Physikalisch Technische Reichsanstalt in Berlin; he declined both. After the retirement of Martin Brendel and with the support of Richard Wachsmuth, Meissner was appointed ordinarius professor of astronomy and director of the University’s observatory. Upon retirement of Wachsmuth, Meissner was appointed as his successor to the chair for astronomy and director of the astronomy institute in 1932.

Spectral lines are broadened due to random movements and collisions of the emitting atoms; this limits resolution. To reduce these broadening mechanism, Meissner, with K. F. Luft and independently of R. Minkowski and H. Bruck, in 1935, developed the technique of observing particle beams perpendicular to their direction of flow. With this technique, Meissner could investigate the hyperfine structure of spectra, which are due to the magnetic moment of the atomic nuclei. This is an area of experimental research which would occupy Meissner for many years.

Meissner’s wife, Janka, was Jewish. Due to persecution of the Jews by the Hitler regime, circumstances caused Meissner stepped down as director in June 1937. While he continued his teaching responsibilities, he was forced to resign in August of that year. Unable to find an industry position, Meissner traveled to the United States in the spring of 1938 to lecture at 10 universities. Circumstances in Germany, including Nazi regulation of travel, did not allow him to take Janka with him. From three offers in the United States, Meissner selected a position as assistant professor at Worcester Polytechnic Institute in November of that year. In early 1939, Janka died from cancer.

From 1941, to the end of his career, Meissner was at Purdue University, first as a visiting professor and then, after naturalization, a full professor and director of the spectroscopy laboratory. In 1942, he married Hanna Hellinger, the sister of a former mathematician colleague at Frankfurt am Main, Ernst Hellinger, who had emigrated from Germany in February 1941. Hanna taught from 1944 to 1965 as professor of sociology and social science at Purdue.

Outside of physics, Meissner’s interests also included history, literature, and languages. He spoke German, English, French, and Italian, and was able to also read Latin, Greek, and Hebrew.

On 9 April 1959, Meissner sailed from New York City for Europe to visit his sister and niece, visit the Bureau International des Poids et Mesures (International Bureau of Weights and Measures), teach in the summer semester at Kiel University, and attend an interferometry conference in London. During the voyage, he died on 13 April. His wife, Hanna, died thirty years later on 8 February 1989, in Lafayette, Indiana.

== Selected Literature ==
- Meißner, K. W.; Luft, K. F. (1937). "Die Hyperfeinstruktur der Natrium-D-Linien". Annalen der Physik (in German). 420 (7). Wiley: 667–672. Bibcode:1937AnP...420..667M. doi:10.1002/andp.19374200706. ISSN 0003-3804.
- Meissner, Karl Wilh. (1942-04-01). "Application of Atomic Beams in Spectroscopy". Reviews of Modern Physics. 14 (2–3). American Physical Society (APS): 68–78. Bibcode:1942RvMP...14...68M. doi:10.1103/revmodphys.14.68. ISSN 0034-6861. Purdue University, Lafayette, Indiana.
- Meissner, K. W.; Mundie, L. G.; Stelson, P. H. (1948-10-15). "Structure of the ^{2}D Terms of the Arc Spectrum of Lithium". Physical Review. 74 (8). American Physical Society (APS): 932–938. Bibcode:1948PhRv...74..932M. doi:10.1103/physrev.74.932. ISSN 0031-899X. Purdue University, Lafayette, Indiana. Received 23 June 1948. When the article was published, Mundie was at the Naval Ordnance Laboratory, White Oak, Maryland.
- Deverall, G. V.; Meissner, K. W.; Zissis, G. J. (1953-07-15). "Hyperfine Structures of the Resonance Lines of Indium (In^{115})". Physical Review. 91 (2). American Physical Society (APS): 297–299. Bibcode:1953PhRv...91..297D. doi:10.1103/physrev.91.297. ISSN 0031-899X. Purdue University, West Lafayette, Indiana. Received 3 April 1953.
- Meissner, K. W.; Kaufman, Victor (1959-10-01). "Calcium Atomic Beam Source and Interference beyond Two-Meter Retardation*". Journal of the Optical Society of America. 49 (10). The Optical Society: 942. Bibcode:1959JOSA...49..942M. doi:10.1364/josa.49.000942. ISSN 0030-3941.

== Bibliography ==
- Karl Meissner – History of Physics at Purdue
- Karl Meissner – Science News
