= Grimm–Sommerfeld rule =

In chemistry, the Grimm–Sommerfeld rule predicts that binary compounds with covalent character that have an average of 4 electrons per atom will have structures where both atoms are tetrahedrally coordinated (e.g. have the wurtzite structure). Examples are silicon carbide, the III-V semiconductors indium phosphide and gallium arsenide, the II-VI semiconductors, cadmium sulfide, cadmium selenide.

Gorynova expanded the scope of the rules to include ternary compounds where the average number of valence electrons per atom was four. Examples of this are the I-IV_{2}-V_{3} CuGe_{2}P_{3} compound which has a zincblende structure.

Compounds or phases that obey the Grimm–Sommerfeld rule are termed Grimm–Sommerfeld compounds or phases.

The rule has also been extended to predict bond lengths in Grimm–Sommerfeld compounds. When the sum of the atomic numbers is the same the bond lengths are the same. An example is the series of bond lengths ranging from 244.7 pm to 246 pm. for the Ge–Ge bond in elemental germanium, the Ga–As bond in gallium arsenide, the Zn–Se bond in zinc selenide and the Cu–Br bond in copper(I) bromide.
