= Paul Peter Ewald =

German crystallographer and physicist (1888–1985)

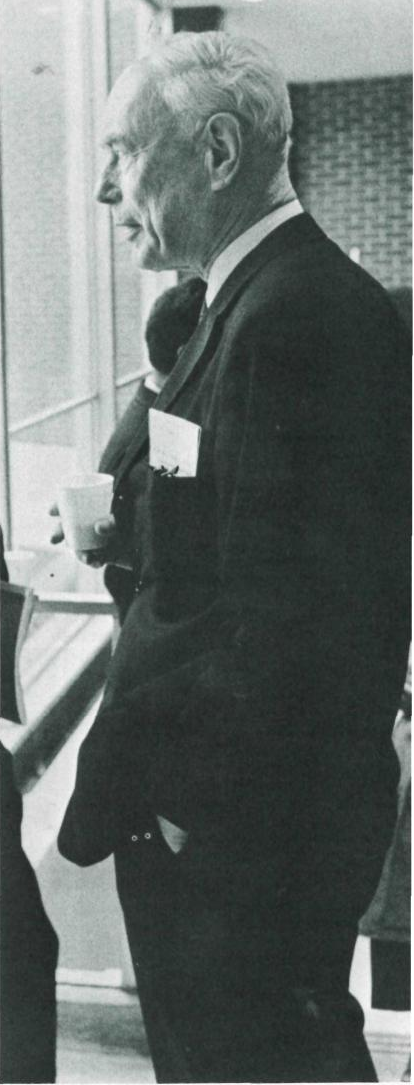
- Ewald in 1967
- Born: January 23, 1888; Berlin, Imperial Germany
- Died: August 23, 1985 (aged 97); Ithaca, New York
- Education: University of Cambridge; University of Göttingen; Ludwig-Maximilians-Universität München
- Known for: Ewald summation Ewald's sphere Ewald–Oseen extinction theorem Multiple scattering theory Pendellösung
- Parents: Paul Ewald (father); Clara Ewald (mother)
- Awards: Gregori Aminoff Prize (1979); Max Planck Medal (1978); ForMemRS (1958)
- Scientific career
- Workplaces: Technische Hochschule Stuttgart; Queen's University Belfast; Polytechnic Institute of Brooklyn
- Thesis: Dispersion und Doppelbrechung von Elektronengittern
- Doctoral advisor: Arnold Sommerfeld
- Other academic advisors: David Hilbert
- Doctoral students: Achilles Papapetrou
- Other notable students: Carl Hermann

Paul Peter Ewald, FRS (January 23, 1888 – August 22, 1985) was a German crystallographer and physicist, a pioneer of X-ray diffraction methods.

== Education ==
Ewald received his early education in the classics at the Gymnasium in Berlin and Potsdam, where he learned to speak Greek, French, and English, in addition to his native German.

Ewald began his higher education in physics, chemistry, and mathematics at Gonville and Caius College in Cambridge, during the winter of 1905. In 1906 and 1907, he continued his formal education at the University of Göttingen, where his interests turned primarily to mathematics. At that time, Göttingen was a world-class center of mathematics under the three “Mandarins” of Göttingen: Felix Klein, David Hilbert, and Hermann Minkowski. While studying at Göttingen, Ewald was taken on by Hilbert as an Ausarbeiter, a paid position as a scribe, i.e., he would take notes in Hilbert’s classes, have the notes approved by Hilbert’s assistant — at that time, Ernst Hellinger — and then prepare a clean copy for the Lesezimmer (mathematics reading room). In 1907, he continued his mathematical studies at the Ludwig-Maximilians-Universität München (LMU) under Arnold Sommerfeld at his Institute for Theoretical Physics. He was granted his doctorate in 1912. His doctoral thesis developed the laws of propagation of X-rays in single crystals. After earning his doctorate, he was an assistant to Sommerfeld.

During the 1911 Christmas recess and in January 1912, Ewald was finishing the writing of his doctoral thesis. It was on a walk through Englischer Garten in Munich, in January, that Ewald was telling Max von Laue about his thesis topic. The wavelengths of concern to Ewald were in the visible region of the spectrum and hence much larger than the spacing between the resonators in Ewald’s crystal model. Laue seemed distracted and wanted to know what would be the effect if much smaller wavelengths were considered. It was not until June of that year that Ewald heard Sommerfeld report to the Physikalische Gesellschaft of Göttingen on the successful diffraction of X-rays by Max von Laue, Paul Knipping and Walter Friedrich at LMU, for which Laue would be awarded the Nobel Prize in Physics, in 1914.

With the rise of theoretical physics in the early part of the twentieth century and its foundation in mathematics, David Hilbert decided to lend an organizing hand to formalizing the sciences, starting with physics. In 1912, Hilbert asked his friend and colleague Arnold Sommerfeld to send him a special assistant for physics. Sommerfeld sent Ewald, who was dubbed as “Hilbert’s tutor for physics”, and he performed this function until 1913, when Sommerfeld sent another one of his students, Alfred Landé. The first problem assigned to Ewald was to review the controversy in the literature on the constants of elasticity in crystals and report back. A few years later, Max Born, at Göttingen, solved the problem.

During Ewald’s stay in Göttingen, he was often a visitor at El BoKaReBo, a boarding house run by Sister Annie at Dahlmannstrasse 17. The name was derived from the first letters of the last names of its boarders: “El” for Ella Philippson (a medical student), “Bo” for Max Born (a Privatdozent) and Hans Bolza (a physics student), “Ka” for Theodore von Kármán (a Privatdozent), and “Re” for Albrecht Renner (a medical student). Richard Courant, a mathematician and Privatdozent, called these people the “in group”. It was here that Ewald met Ella Philippson, who was to become his wife.

In the spring of 1913, Niels Bohr, of the Institute for Theoretical Physics at the University of Copenhagen, submitted his theory of the Bohr atomic model for publication. Later that year, Ewald attended the Birmingham meeting of the British Association where he heard accounts and discussions of James Jeans’ review on radiation theory and Bohr’s model. This ignited a major new area of research for Sommerfeld and his students — the study and interpretation of atomic spectra and molecular band spectroscopy and theoretical modeling of atomic and molecular structure.

During World War I, Ewald served in the German military as a medical technician. When he could, he continued to think about the physics of his doctoral thesis, and he developed the dynamical theory of X-ray diffraction, which he was later to use in his Habilitationsschrift. At the conclusion of the war, he returned to LMU as an assistant to Sommerfeld. He completed his Habilitation in 1917, and became a Privatdozent there, while remaining as an assistant to Sommerfeld.

In 1921, while still at LMU, Ewald published a paper on the theta function method of analyzing dipole fields in crystals, an offshoot from his earlier work on the dynamical theory of optics and X-rays in crystals, which appeared in three journal publications. According to Ewald, the impetus for the method came from a skiing holiday in Mittenwald, at Easter, in 1911. It was Sommerfeld’s practice to take his students and assistants on skiing outings in the winter and mountain climbing outings in the summer, where the discussions of physics were as hard as the physical exertion of the outings. Ewald was having trouble subtracting out of his calculations the field of the test dipole. The solution was provided by Sommerfeld’s assistant and former doctoral student, Peter Debye, in a discussion that took no more than 15 minutes. Ewald’s paper has been widely cited in the literature as well as in scientific books, such as Dynamical Theory of Crystal Lattices, by Max Born and Kun Huang.

== Career ==
When Erwin Schrödinger let it be known that he was leaving his position as extraordinarius professor at the Technische Hochschule Stuttgart to go to the University of Breslau, Ewald was called and accepted the position in 1921. In 1922, he was called to the University of Münster. Ewald used the offer to better his position at Stuttgart to ordinarius professor; however, while Ewald was nominally promoted to ordinarius professor, the established position was actually retained as an extraordinarius professorship.

From 1922, Erwin Fues, also a former doctoral student of Sommerfeld, did postgraduate work at the Stuttgart Technische Hochschule under Ewald; Fues completed his Habilitation in 1924. Also in that year, Ewald became co-editor of Zeitschrift für Kristallographie. In 1929, he received a call to the Technische Hochschule Hanover. Again, he used this call to better his position at Stuttgart by negotiating for a second assistant, the permanent conversion of his position to that of ordinarius professor, and a separate building for his activities. The building was formally opened in 1930 as the Institute for Theoretical Physics, with Ewald as director. The institute was modeled after Sommerfeld’s Institute for Theoretical Physics at Munich, in that it would conduct theoretical work as well as have space and equipment for experimental work.

In 1931, Ewald was appointed director of the physical science division.

At Göttingen, Richard Courant had taken Hilbert’s lecture notes which were available in the Lesezimmer, edited them and added to them to write a two-volume work. The first volume, Methoden der mathematischen Physik I, was published in 1924.

Upon seeing the book, Ewald was compelled to write a detailed review describing it as providing mathematical tools, characterized by eigenvalues and eigenfunctions, for the theoretical physics then being developed.

The Courant-Hilbert book fortuitously contained the mathematics necessary for the development of the Heisenberg-Born matrix mechanics formulation of quantum mechanics and also for Schrödinger’s wave mechanics formulation, both put forward in 1925. The main thrust of Ewald’s work was X-ray crystallography, and Ewald was the eponym of Ewald construction and the Ewald sphere, both useful constructs in that field.

In 1929, in order to remove confusion from the proliferation of crystallographic data, Ewald proposed review and collection of the best data into a single publication. The results were published in 1935 as the Internationale Tabellen zur Bestimmung von Kristallstrukturen. Another contribution by Ewald, published in 1931, Strukturbericht Volume I (1913-1928) was edited by Ewald and C. Hermann.

Ewald was elected Rector at Stuttgart in 1932. However, due to increasing difficulties with faculty who were members of National Socialism in Germany, he resigned his position in the spring of 1933, one year before his term was due to expire. Ewald continued with his other activities. However, over increasing problems with the Dozentenbund, Wilhelm Stortz, University Rector, asked Ewald to leave. He emigrated to England in 1937 along with his mother, the painter Clara Ewald, and took a research position in Cambridge, until he was offered and accepted a lectureship at Queen's University Belfast in 1939. He later became a professor of mathematical physics.

While lecturing at Duke University in 1937, Hans Bethe, who got his doctorate under Sommerfeld in 1928, bumped into Ewald's daughter Rose, who had already emigrated to the United States and who was attending the school. They were married in September 1939. Thus, Bethe became son-in-law to Paul Peter Ewald.

Near the end of World War II, Sommerfeld organized his lecture notes and began writing the six-volume Lectures on Theoretical Physics. While at the Polytechnic Institute of Brooklyn, Ewald wrote a Foreword to Sommerfeld’s Course, which appeared in the English translation of Sommerfeld’s work.

Also, toward the end of World War II, Ewald was concerned that peace would result in the establishment of multiple, competing national journals of crystallography. So, in 1944, at Oxford, he proposed the establishment of an International Union of Crystallography (IUCr) that would have sole responsibility for publishing crystallographic research. In 1946, he was elected chairman of the Provisional International Crystallographic Committee, in a London meeting of crystallographers, from 13 countries; he served in this capacity until 1948, when the Union was formed. The Committee also nominated him Editor of the journal to be published by the Union. The first issue of Acta Crystallographica was published in 1948, the same year that Ewald chaired the first General Assembly and International Congress of the IUCr, which was held at Harvard University.

In 1952, Ewald was elected president of the American Crystallographic Association. He served on the IUCr Executive Committee from its foundation until 1966, and he was its Vice-President in 1957 and President in 1960, a position he held until 1963. His editorship of its journal Acta Crystallographica extended from its inception in 1948 to 1959.

A decade after moving to Belfast, Ewald moved to the United States in 1949 and took a position at the Polytechnic Institute of Brooklyn, as a professor and head of the physics department. He retired as head of the department in 1957 and from teaching in 1959.

== Honors ==
- 1958 – Fellow of the Royal Society
- 1978 – Deutsche Physikalische Gesellschaft Max Planck medal
- 1979 – Gregori Aminoff Prize
- 1986 – The International Union of Crystallography established the Ewald Prize for outstanding contributions to the science of crystallography.

== Books ==
- Paul Peter Ewald Kristalle und Röntgenstrahlen (Springer, 1923)
- Paul Peter Ewald, Theodor Pöschl, Ludwig Prandtl; authorized translation by J. Dougall and Winifred Margaret Deans The Physics of Solids and Fluids: With Recent Developments (Blackie and Son, 1930)
- Paul Peter Ewald Der Weg der Forschung (insbesondere der Physik) (A. Bonz'erben, 1932)
- Peter Paul Ewald, editor 50 Years of X-Ray Diffraction (Reprinted in pdf format for the IUCr XVIII Congress, Glasgow, Scotland, 1962, 1999 International Union of Crystallography)
- Peter Paul Ewald On the Foundations of Crystal Optics (Air Force Cambridge Research Laboratories, 1970)

== See also ==
- Ewald summation
- Ewald's sphere
- Multiple scattering theory
- Ewald–Oseen extinction theorem
- Pendellösung
- George Doundoulakis

== Bibliography ==
- Durward W. J. Cruickshank, Hellmut J. Juretschke, N.` Kato (editors) P. P. Ewald and His Dynamical Theory of X-ray Diffraction: A Memorial Volume for Paul P. Ewald (Oxford University Press, 1992)
