= Sommerfeld–Kossel displacement law =

Law of atomic spectra

The Sommerfeld–Kossel displacement law states that the first spark (singly ionized) spectrum of an element is similar in all details to the arc (neutral) spectrum of the element preceding it in the periodic table. Likewise, the second (doubly ionized) spark spectrum of an element is similar in all details to the first (singly ionized) spark spectrum of the element preceding it, or to the arc (neutral) spectrum of the element with atomic number two less, and so forth.

Hence, the spectra of C I (neutral carbon), N II (singly ionized nitrogen), and O III (doubly ionized oxygen) atoms are similar, apart from shifts of the spectra to shorter wavelengths. C I, N II, and O III all have the same number of electrons, six, and the same ground-state electron configuration:

$1s^2\,$ $2s^2\,$ $2p^2\,$ $^3$$P_0\,$.

The law was discovered by and named after Arnold Sommerfeld and Walther Kossel, who set it forth in a paper submitted to Verhandungen der Deutschen Physikalischen Gesellschaft in early 1919.
