= Arnold Sommerfeld =

German theoretical physicist (1868–1951)

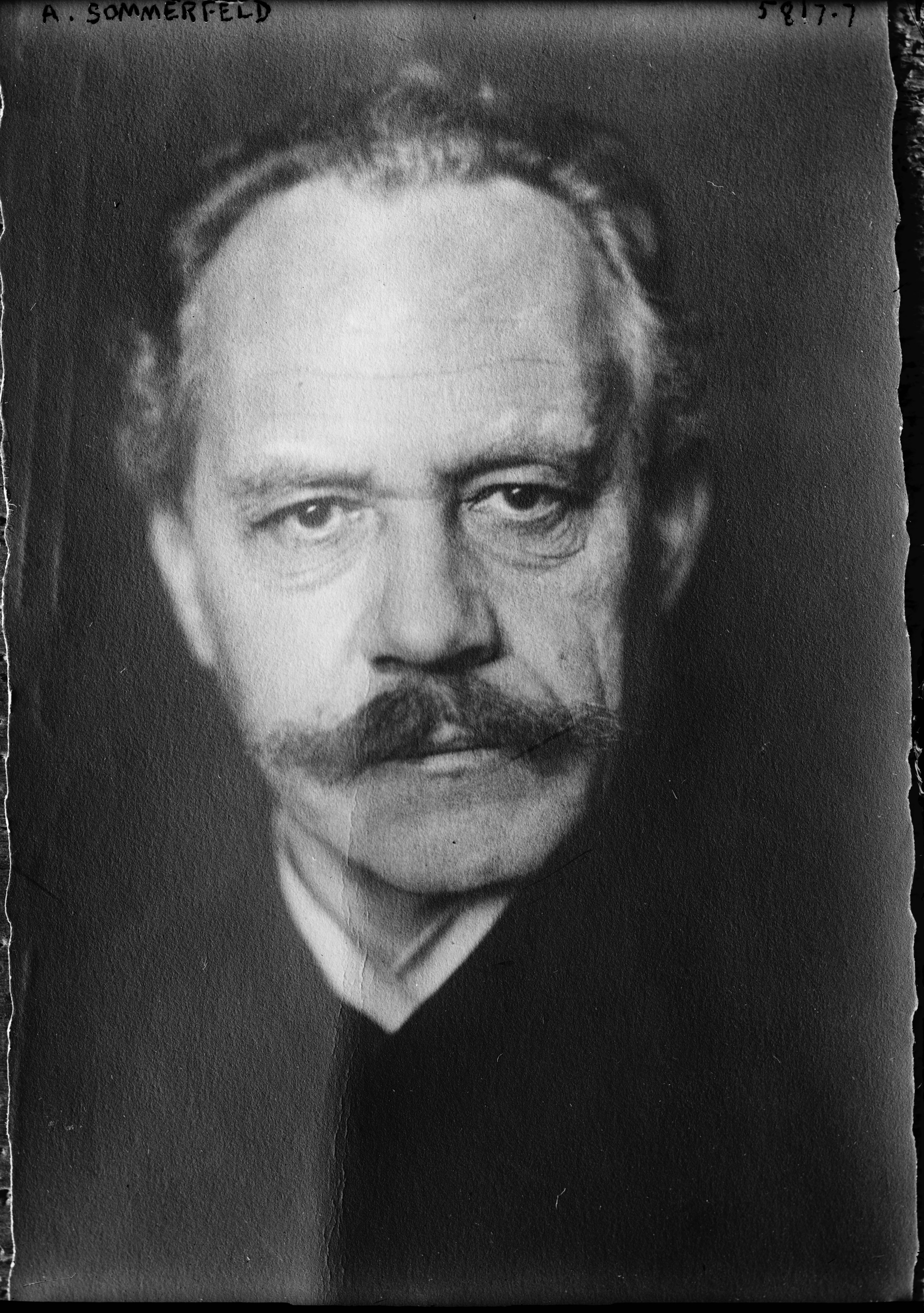
- Sommerfeld, 1920s
- Born: Arnold Johannes Wilhelm Sommerfeld; 5 December 1868; Königsberg, Province of Prussia, Kingdom of Prussia
- Died: 26 April 1951 (aged 82); Munich, Bavaria, West Germany
- Resting place: Nordfriedhof, Munich
- Education: University of Königsberg (Dr. phil.); University of Göttingen (Dr. habil.)
- Known for: Bohr–Sommerfeld model; Sommerfeld–Kossel displacement law; Free electron model; Fine structure; Fine-structure constant; Quantum number; Azimuthal quantum number
- Spouse: Johanna Höpfner
- Awards: Matteucci Medal (1924); ForMemRS (1926); Max Planck Medal (1931); James Scott Prize Lectureship (1933); Lorentz Medal (1939); Oersted Medal (1949)
- Scientific career
- Fields: Atomic physics; Quantum physics
- Workplaces: University of Göttingen (1895–1897); Bergakademie Clausthal (1897–1900); Technische Hochschule Aachen (1900–1906); Ludwig-Maximilians-Universität München (1906–1935)
- Thesis: Die willkürlichen Functionen in der mathematischen Physik (1891)
- Doctoral advisor: Ferdinand von Lindemann
- Other academic advisors: Felix Klein
- Doctoral students: See list: Peter Debye (1908); Ludwig Hopf (1909); Rudolf Seeliger (1910); Wilhelm Lenz (1911); Paul Peter Ewald (1912); Paul Sophus Epstein (1914); Alfred Landé (1914); Erwin Fues (1920); Adolf Kratzer (1920); Wolfgang Pauli (1921); Gregor Wentzel (1921); Werner Heisenberg (1923); Otto Laporte (1924); Karl Bechert (1925); Edward Condon (1926); Ernst Guillemin (1926); Helmut Hönl (1926); Ernst C. Stückelberg (1927); Albrecht Unsöld (1927); Hans Bethe (1928); Hermann Brück (1928); Herbert Fröhlich (1930); Werner Romberg (1933); Walter Franz (1934); Heinrich Welker (1936)
- Other notable students: See list: William Allis; Carl Eckart; Eugene Feenberg; Walter Heitler; William V. Houston; Edwin C. Kemble; Walther Kossel; Max von Laue; Karl Meissner; Philip M. Morse; Linus Pauling; Rudolf Peierls; Howard P. Robertson; Walter Rogowski; Wojciech Rubinowicz

Arnold Johannes Wilhelm Sommerfeld (German: [ˈaʁnɔlt ˈzɔmɐˌfɛlt]; 5 December 1868 – 26 April 1951) was a German theoretical physicist who pioneered developments in both atomic and quantum physics, and also educated and mentored many students for the new era of theoretical physics.

Sommerfeld served as doctoral advisor and postdoctoral advisor to seven Nobel Prize winners and supervised at least 30 other famous physicists and chemists.

Sommerfeld introduced the second quantum number, azimuthal quantum number, and the third quantum number, magnetic quantum number. He also introduced the fine-structure constant and pioneered X-ray wave theory.

== Early life and education ==
Arnold Johannes Wilhelm Sommerfeld was born on 5 December 1868 in Königsberg (now Kaliningrad, Russia) into a family with deep ancestral roots in Prussia. His mother, Cäcilie Matthias (1839–1902), was the daughter of a Potsdam builder. His father, Franz Sommerfeld (1820–1906), was a physician from a leading family in Königsberg, where Arnold's grandfather had resettled from the hinterland in 1822 for a career as Court Postal Secretary in the service of the Kingdom of Prussia. Sommerfeld was baptized a Christian in his family's Prussian Evangelical Protestant Church, and although not religious, he would never renounce his Christian faith.

Sommerfeld studied mathematics and physical sciences at the University of Königsberg. His thesis advisor was the mathematician Ferdinand von Lindemann, and he also benefited from classes with mathematicians Adolf Hurwitz and David Hilbert and physicist Emil Wiechert. His participation in the student fraternity Burschenschaft resulted in a dueling scar on his face. He received his Ph.D. on 24 October 1891.

After receiving his doctorate, Sommerfeld remained at Königsberg to work on his teaching diploma. He passed the national exam in 1892 and then began a year of military service, which was done with the reserve regiment in Königsberg. He completed his obligatory military service in September 1893, and for the next eight years continued voluntary eight-week military service. With his turned up moustache, his physical build, his Prussian bearing, and the fencing scar on his face, he gave the impression of being a colonel in the hussars.

== Career ==
=== Göttingen ===
In October 1893, Sommerfeld went to the University of Göttingen, which was the center of mathematics in Germany. There, he became an assistant to Theodor Liebisch at the Mineralogical Institute, through a fortunate personal contact—Liebisch had been a professor at the University of Königsberg and a friend of the Sommerfeld family.

In September 1894, Sommerfeld became Felix Klein's assistant, which included taking comprehensive notes during Klein's lectures and writing them up for the Mathematics Reading Room, as well as managing the reading room. Sommerfeld's habilitation was completed under Klein in 1895, which allowed Sommerfeld to become a Privatdozent at Göttingen. As a Privatdozent, he lectured on a wide range of mathematical and mathematical physics topics. His lectures on partial differential equations were first offered at Göttingen, and they evolved over his teaching career to become Volume VI of his textbook series Lectures on Theoretical Physics, under the title Partial Differential Equations in Physics.

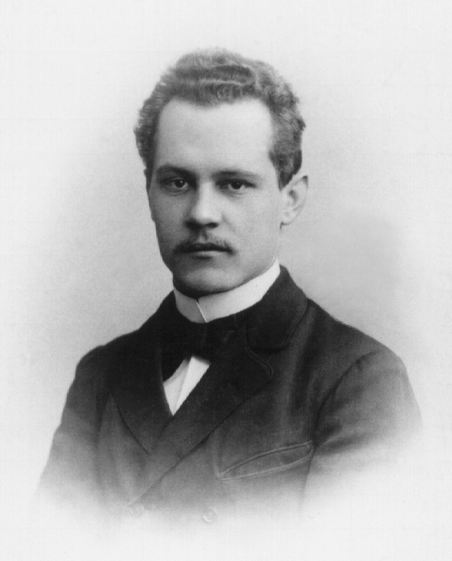
Sommerfeld in 1897

Lectures by Klein in 1895 and 1896 on rotating bodies led Klein and Sommerfeld to write a four-volume text Die Theorie des Kreisels – a 13-year collaboration, 1897–1910. The first two volumes were on theory, and the latter two were on applications in geophysics, astronomy, and technology. The association Sommerfeld had with Klein influenced Sommerfeld's turn of mind to be applied mathematics and in the art of lecturing.

While at Göttingen, Sommerfeld met Johanna Höpfner, the daughter of Ernst Höpfner, curator at Göttingen.

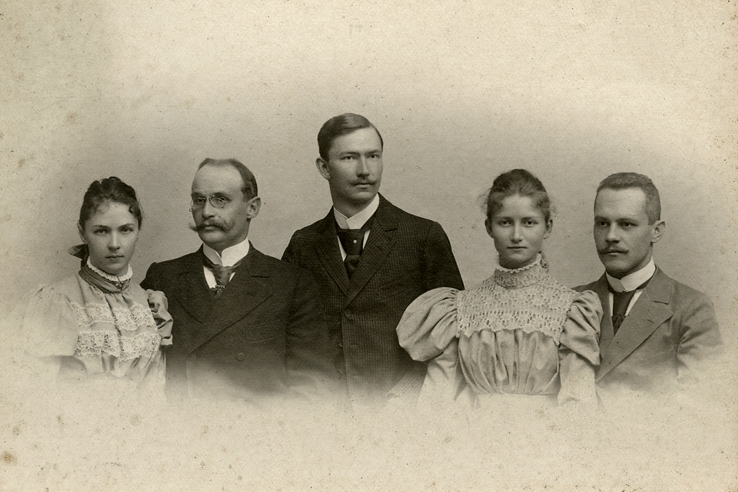
Sommerfeld (rightmost) with Johanna and her sister who married Ludwig Rhumbler at the double wedding of 1897. Willy Höpfner, brother of Johanna at centre.

In October 1897, Sommerfeld was appointed Professor of Mathematics at the Bergakademie Clausthal in Saxony; he was successor to Wilhelm Wien. This appointment provided enough income to eventually marry Johanna.

At Klein's request, Sommerfeld took on the position of editor of Volume V of Enzyklopädie der mathematischen Wissenschaften; it was a major undertaking which lasted from 1898 to 1926.

=== Aachen ===
In 1900, Sommerfeld was appointed to the Chair of Applied Mechanics at Technische Hochschule Aachen as extraordinarius professor, which was arranged through Klein's efforts. At Aachen, he developed the theory of hydrodynamics, which would retain his interest for a long time. Later, at the Ludwig-Maximilians-Universität München, Sommerfeld's students Ludwig Hopf and Werner Heisenberg would write their Ph.D. theses on this topic. For his contributions to the understanding of journal bearing lubrication during his time at Technische Hochschule Aachen, he was named as one of the 23 "Men of Tribology" by Duncan Dowson.

=== Munich ===
From 1906, Sommerfeld established himself as Ordinarius Professor of Physics and director of the new Theoretical Physics Institute at the Ludwig-Maximilians-Universität München. He was selected for these positions by Wilhelm Röntgen, Director of the Physics Institute at the Ludwig-Maximilians-Universität München, which was looked upon by Sommerfeld as being called to a "privileged sphere of action".

Until the late 19th century and early 20th century, experimental physics in Germany was considered as having a higher status within the community. In the early 20th century, theorists, such as Sommerfeld at Munich and Max Born at Göttingen, with their early training in mathematics, turned this around so that mathematical physics, i.e., theoretical physics, became the prime mover, and experimental physics was used to verify or advance theory. After getting their doctorates with Sommerfeld, Wolfgang Pauli, Werner Heisenberg and Walter Heitler became Born's assistants and made significant contributions to the development of quantum mechanics, which was then in very rapid development.

During his 32 years of teaching at Munich, Sommerfeld taught general and specialized courses, as well as holding seminars and colloquia. The general courses were on mechanics, mechanics of deformable bodies, electrodynamics, optics, thermodynamics and statistical mechanics, and partial differential equations in physics. They were held four hours per week, 13 weeks in the winter and 11 weeks in the summer, and were for students who had taken experimental physics courses from Röntgen and later by Wilhelm Wien. There was also a two-hour weekly presentation for the discussion of problems. The specialized courses were of topical interest and based on Sommerfeld's research interests; material from these courses appeared later in the scientific literature publications of Sommerfeld. The objective of these special lectures was to grapple with current issues in theoretical physics and for Sommerfeld and the students to garner a systematic comprehension of the issue, independent of whether or not they were successful in solving the problem posed by the current issue. For the seminar and colloquium periods, students were assigned papers from the current literature and they then prepared an oral presentation. From 1942 to 1951, Sommerfeld worked on putting his lecture notes in order for publication. They were published as the six-volume Lectures on Theoretical Physics.

For a list of students, please see the list organized by type. Four of Sommerfeld's doctoral students, Werner Heisenberg, Wolfgang Pauli, Peter Debye and Hans Bethe, went on to win Nobel Prizes, while others, most notably, Walter Heitler, Rudolf Peierls, Karl Bechert, Hermann Brück, Paul Peter Ewald, Eugene Feenberg, Herbert Fröhlich, Erwin Fues, Ernst Guillemin, Helmut Hönl, Ludwig Hopf, Adolf Kratzer, Otto Laporte, Wilhelm Lenz, Karl Meissner, Rudolf Seeliger, Ernst C. Stückelberg, Heinrich Welker, Gregor Wentzel, Alfred Landé and Léon Brillouin, became famous in their own right. Three of Sommerfeld's postdoctoral supervisees, Linus Pauling, Isidor I. Rabi and Max von Laue, won Nobel Prizes, and ten others, William Allis, Edward Condon, Carl Eckart, Edwin C. Kemble, William V. Houston, Karl Herzfeld, Walther Kossel, Philip M. Morse, Howard Robertson and Wojciech Rubinowicz, went on to become famous in their own right. Walter Rogowski, an undergraduate student of Sommerfeld at Technische Hochschule Aachen, also went on to become famous in his own right. Max Born believed Sommerfeld's abilities included the "discovery and development of talents". Albert Einstein told Sommerfeld: "What I especially admire about you is that you have, as it were, pounded out of the soil such a large number of young talents." Sommerfeld's style as a professor and institute director did not put distance between him and his colleagues and students. He invited collaboration from them, and their ideas often influenced his own views in physics. He entertained them in his home and met with them in cafes before and after seminars and colloquia. Sommerfeld owned an alpine ski hut to which students were often invited for discussions of physics as demanding as the sport.

While at Munich, Sommerfeld came in contact with the special theory of relativity by Albert Einstein, which was not yet widely accepted. His mathematical contributions to the theory helped its acceptance by the skeptics. In 1914 he worked with Léon Brillouin on the propagation of electromagnetic waves in dispersive media. He became one of the founders of quantum mechanics; some of his contributions included co-discovery of the Sommerfeld–Wilson quantization rules (1915), a generalization of Bohr's atomic model, introduction of the Sommerfeld fine-structure constant (1916), co-discovery with Walther Kossel of the Sommerfeld–Kossel displacement law (1919), and publishing Atombau und Spektrallinien (1919), which became the "bible" of atomic theory for the new generation of physicists who developed atomic and quantum physics. The book underwent 4 editions from 1919 to 1924, to incorporate the latest advances in quantum mechanics, before splitting into two volumes.

In 1918, Sommerfeld succeeded Einstein as Chair of the Deutsche Physikalische Gesellschaft (DPG). One of his accomplishments was the founding of a new journal. The scientific papers published in DPG journals became so voluminous, that in 1919 a committee of the DPG recommended the establishment of Zeitschrift für Physik for publication of original research articles, which commenced in 1920. Since any reputable scientist could have their article published without refereeing, time between submission and publication was very rapid – as fast as two weeks. This greatly stimulated the scientific theoretical developments, especially that of quantum mechanics in Germany at that time, as this journal was the preferred publication vehicle for the new generation of quantum theorists with avant-garde views.

In the winter semester of 1922/1923, Sommerfeld gave the Carl Schurz Memorial Professor of Physics lectures at the University of Wisconsin–Madison. He was elected to honorary membership of the Manchester Literary and Philosophical Society 13 April 1926

In 1927, Sommerfeld applied Fermi–Dirac statistics to the Drude model of electrons in metals – a model put forth by Paul Drude. The new theory solved many of the problems predicting thermal properties the original model had and became known as the Drude–Sommerfeld model.

In 1928/1929, Sommerfeld traveled globally, with major stops in India, China, Japan, and the United States.

Sommerfeld was a great theoretician; besides his invaluable contributions to quantum theory, he worked in other fields of physics, such as the classical theory of electromagnetism. For example, he proposed a solution to the problem of a radiating hertzian dipole over a conducting earth, which over the years led to many applications. His Sommerfeld identity and Sommerfeld integrals are to the present day the most common way to solve this kind of problem. Also, as a mark of the prowess of Sommerfeld's school of theoretical physics and the rise of theoretical physics in the early 1900s, as of 1928, nearly one-third of the ordinarius professors of theoretical physics in the German-speaking world were students of Sommerfeld.

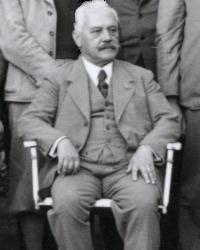
Arnold Sommerfeld, Stuttgart 1935

On 1 April 1935, Sommerfeld achieved emeritus status. He remained as his own temporary replacement during the selection process for his successor, which took until 1 December 1939. The process was lengthy due to academic and political differences between the Munich Faculty's selection and that of both the Reichserziehungsministerium (REM – Reich Education Ministry) and the supporters of Deutsche Physik, which was anti-Semitic and had a bias against theoretical physics, especially including quantum mechanics. The appointment of Wilhelm Müller – who was not a theoretical physicist, had not published in a physics journal, and was not a member of the DPG – as a replacement for Sommerfeld, was considered such a travesty and detrimental to educating a new generation of physicists that both Ludwig Prandtl, director of the Kaiser-Wilhelm-Institut für Strömungsforschung (Kaiser Wilhelm Institute for Flow Research), and Carl Ramsauer, director of the research division of Allgemeine Elektrizitäts-Gesellschaft (General Electric Company) and President of the DPG, made reference to this in their correspondence to officials in the Reich. In an attachment to Prandtl's 28 April 1941 letter to Reich Marshal Hermann Göring, Prandtl referred to the appointment as "sabotage" of necessary theoretical physics instruction. In an attachment to Ramsauer's 20 January 1942 letter to Reich Minister Bernhard Rust, Ramsauer concluded that the appointment amounted to the "destruction of the Munich theoretical physics tradition".

As for Sommerfeld's once patriotic views, he wrote to Einstein shortly after Hitler took power: "I can assure you that the misuse of the word ‘national’ by our rulers has thoroughly broken me of the habit of national feelings that was so pronounced in my case. I would now be willing to see Germany disappear as a power and merge into a pacified Europe."

=== Death ===
Sommerfeld died on 26 April 1951 in Munich from injuries after a traffic accident while walking with his grandchildren. The accident occurred at the corner of Dietlindenstraße and Biedersteiner Straße, near his house which was located at Dunantstraße 6. He is buried at the Nordfriedhof, close to where he lived at the time.

== Honors and awards ==
Sommerfeld was awarded many honors in his lifetime, such as the Lorentz Medal, the Max Planck Medal, and the Oersted Medal, and election to the Royal Society, the National Academy of Sciences, the Academy of Sciences of the USSR, the Indian Academy of Sciences, and other academies including those in Berlin, Munich, Göttingen, and Vienna, as well as having conferred on him numerous honorary degrees from universities including the University of Rostock, Technische Hochschule Aachen, University of Calcutta, and National and Kapodistrian University of Athens. He was elected an Honorary member of the Optical Society in 1950. He was nominated for the Nobel Prize 84 times, more than any other physicist (including Otto Stern, who got nominated 82 times), but he never received the award.

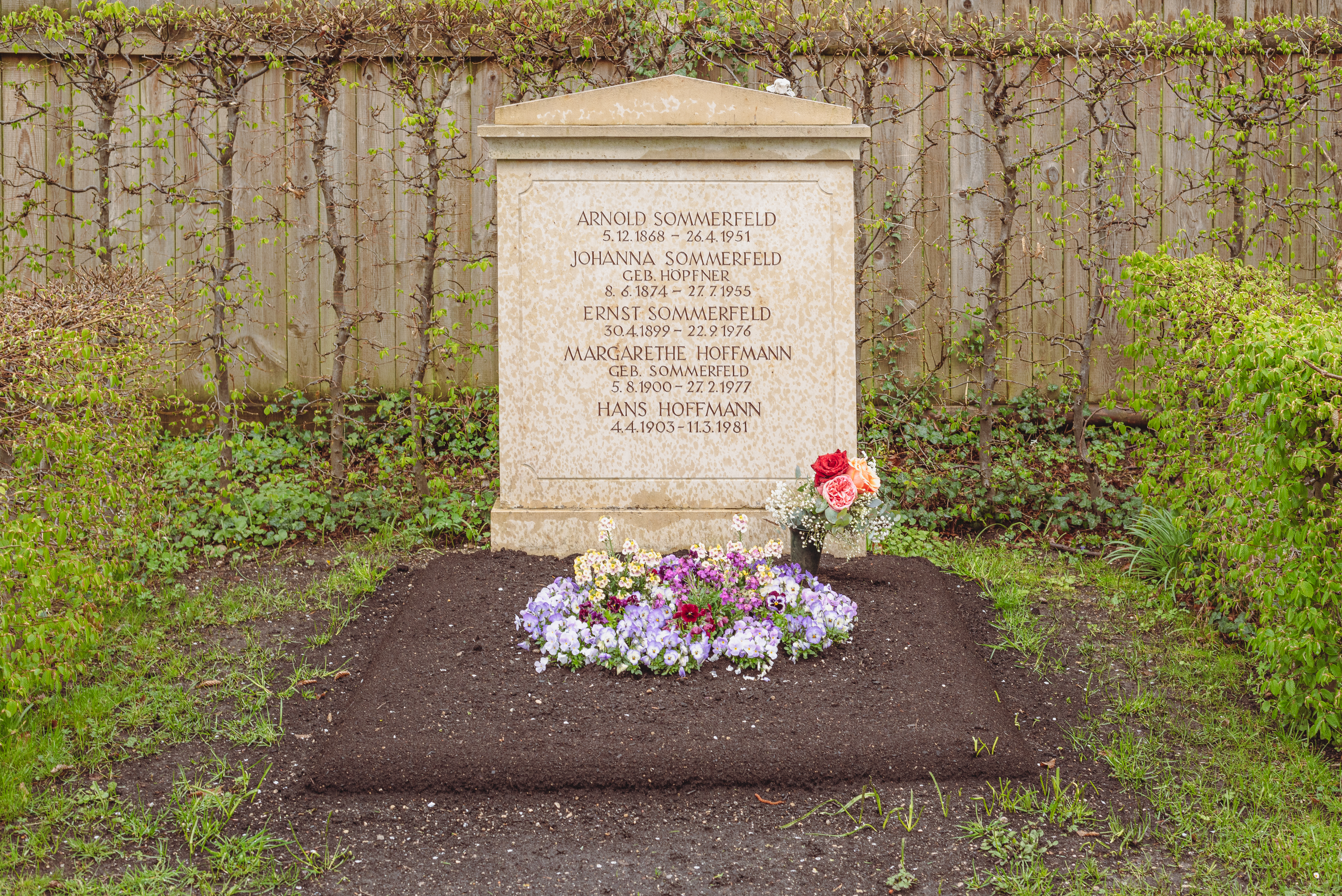
Sommerfeld's grave at the Munich Nordfriedhof

In 2004, the center for theoretical physics at LMU Munich (Ludwig-Maximilians-Universität München) was named after him.

== Works ==
=== Articles ===
- Arnold Sommerfeld, "Mathematische Theorie der Diffraction" (The Mathematical Theory of Diffraction), Math. Ann. 47(2–3), pp. 317–374. (1896). doi:10.1007/bf01447273.
  - Translated by Raymond J. Nagem, Mario Zampolli, and Guido Sandri in Mathematical Theory of Diffraction (Birkhäuser Boston, 2003), ISBN 0-8176-3604-8
- Arnold Sommerfeld, "Uber die Ausbreitung der Wellen in der Drahtlosen Telegraphie" (The Propagation of Waves in Wireless Telegraphy), Ann. Physik [4] 28, 665 (1909); 62, 95 (1920); 81, 1135 (1926).
- Arnold Sommerfeld, "Some Reminiscences of My Teaching Career", American Journal of Physics Volume 17, Number 5, 315–316 (1949). Address upon receipt of the 1948 Oersted Medal.

=== Books ===
- Arnold Sommerfeld, Atombau und Spektrallinien (Friedrich Vieweg und Sohn, Braunschweig, 1919)
  - Arnold Sommerfeld, translated from the third German edition by Henry L. Brose Atomic Structure and Spectral Lines (Methuen, 1923)
- Arnold Sommerfeld, Three Lectures on Atomic Physics (London: Methuen, 1926)
- Arnold Sommerfeld, Atombau und Spektrallinien, Wellenmechanischer Ergänzungband (Vieweg, Braunschweig, 1929)
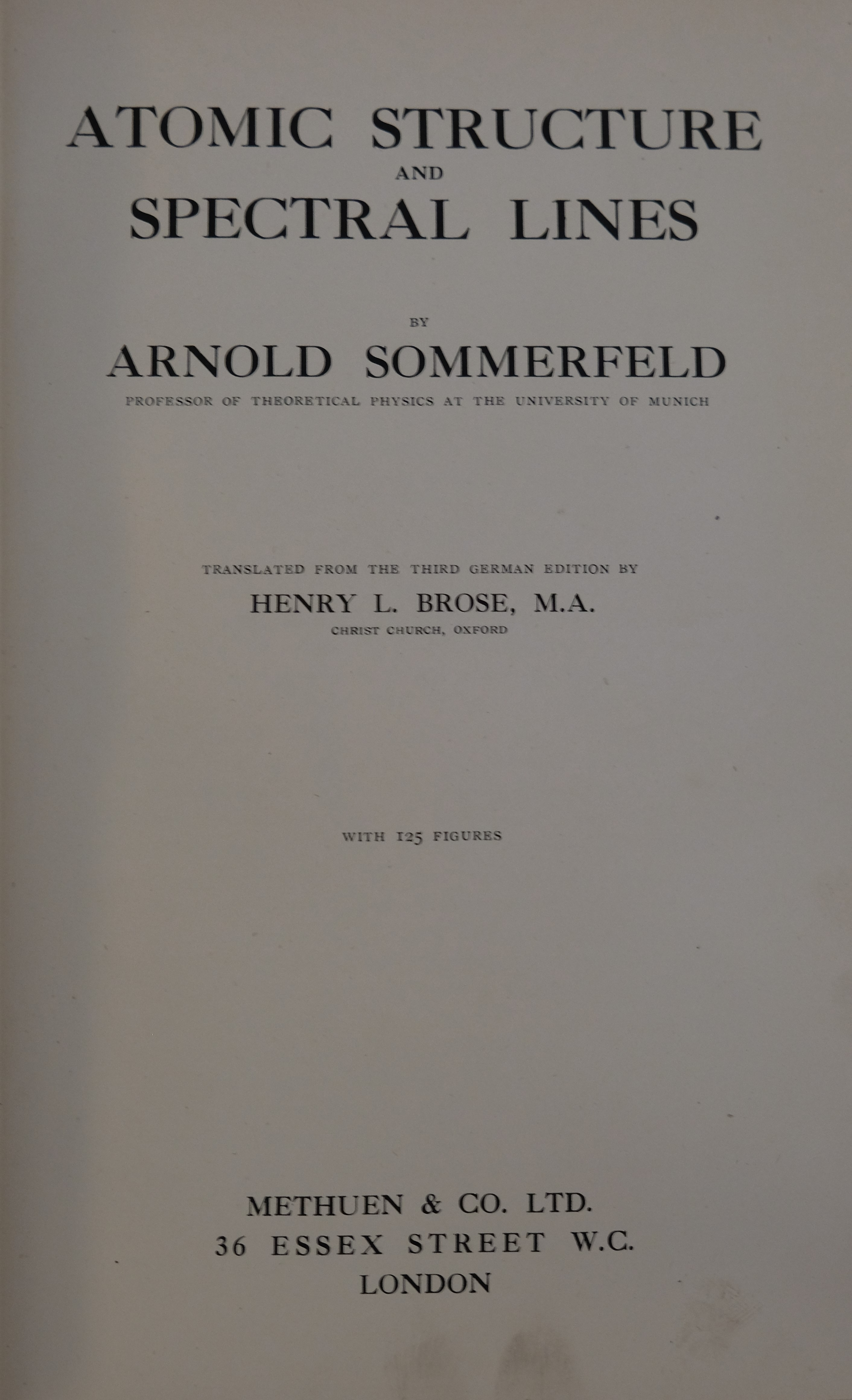
  - Title page to Atomic Structure and Spectral Lines (1923), translated by Henry Brose
    Arnold Sommerfeld, translated by Henry L. Brose Wave-Mechanics: Supplementary Volume to Atomic Structure and Spectral Lines (Dutton, 1929)
- Arnold Sommerfeld, Lectures on Wave Mechanics Delivered before the Calcutta University (Calcutta University, 1929)
- Arnold Sommerfeld and Hans Bethe, Elektronentheorie der Metalle, in H. Geiger and K. Scheel, editors Handbuch der Physik Volume 24, Part 2, 333–622 (Springer, 1933). This nearly 300-page chapter was later published as a separate book: Elektronentheorie der Metalle (Springer, 1967).
- Arnold Sommerfeld, Mechanik – Vorlesungen über theoretische Physik Band 1 (Akademische Verlagsgesellschaft Becker & Erler, 1943)
  - Arnold Sommerfeld, translated from the fourth German edition by Martin O. Stern, Mechanics – Lectures on Theoretical Physics Volume I (Academic Press, 1964)
- Arnold Sommerfeld, Mechanik der deformierbaren Medien – Vorlesungen über theoretische Physik Band 2 (Akademische Verlagsgesellschaft Becker & Erler, 1945)
  - Arnold Sommerfeld, translated from the second German edition by G. Kuerti, Mechanics of Deformable Bodies – Lectures on Theoretical Physics Volume II (Academic Press, 1964)
- Arnold Sommerfeld, Elektrodynamik – Vorlesungen über theoretische Physik Band 3 (Klemm Verlag, Erscheinungsort, 1948)
  - Arnold Sommerfeld, translated from the German by Edward G. Ramberg Electrodynamics – Lectures on Theoretical Physics Volume III (Academic Press, 1964)
- Arnold Sommerfeld, Optik – Vorlesungen über theoretische Physik Band 4 (Dieterich'sche Verlagsbuchhandlung, 1950)
  - Arnold Sommerfeld, translated from the first German edition by Otto Laporte and Peter A. Moldauer Optics – Lectures on Theoretical Physics Volume IV (Academic Press, 1964)
- Arnold Sommerfeld, Thermodynamik und Statistik – Vorlesungen über theoretische Physik Band 5 Herausgegeben von Fritz Bopp und Josef Meixner. (Diederich sche Verlagsbuchhandlung, 1952)
  - Arnold Sommerfeld, edited by F. Bopp and J. Meixner, and translated by J. Kestin, Thermodynamics and Statistical Mechanics – Lectures on Theoretical Physics Volume V (Academic Press, 1964)
- Arnold Sommerfeld, Partielle Differentialgleichungen der Physik – Vorlesungen über theoretische Physik Band 6 (Dieterich'sche Verlagsbuchhandlung, 1947)
  - Arnold Sommerfeld, translated by Ernest G. Straus, Partial Differential Equations in Physics – Lectures on Theoretical Physics Volume VI (Academic Press, first printing 1949, second printing 1953; also as n°1 of AP pure and applied mathematics collection)
- Felix Klein and Arnold Sommerfeld, Über die Theorie des Kreisels [4 volumes] (Teubner, 1897)
  - Felix Klein and Arnold Sommerfeld, translated by Raymond J. Nagem and Guido Sandri, The Theory of the Top, vol 1. (Boston: Birkhauser, 2008) ISBN 0817647201

== See also ==
- List of things named after Arnold Sommerfeld
