= History of the twin paradox =

Chronology of development from 1905

In special relativity, the history of the twin paradox chronicles the development of the famous thought experiment known as the twin paradox, which started in 1905 when Albert Einstein showed that a clock returning from a round-trip shows less elapsed time than a clock that remained at its place. By 1911, Einstein, Paul Langevin and Emil Wiechert had extended this result to life forms and human beings, with Hermann Weyl introducing twin brothers in 1918.

In 1911, Langevin, Wiechert and Max von Laue showed that asymmetric aging of clocks or life forms along closed paths directly corresponds to the fact, that the proper time is maximal along the straight worldlines of non-accelerated clocks. Laue pointed out that the relativity of time and asymmetric aging appears "paradoxical" to those who are still unfamiliar with relativity, while some even claimed that asymmetric aging contradicts the relativity principle, which was refuted by Laue himself and others such as Einstein (1918) who pointed out the meaning of the relativity principle and demonstrated the asymmetries between the twins.

== Round-trip experiment (1905) ==
In 1905, Einstein (Note: Miller, A. I. (1981), Albert Einstein's special theory of relativity. Emergence (1905) and early interpretation (1905–1911), Reading: Addison–Wesley, ISBN 978-0-201-04679-3; Early history in section 7.4.13 (Einstein, Langevin, Wiechert, Laue) and footnotes 29-34 of chapter 7 (Sommerfeld, Petzoldt, Bergson).) (Note: Marder, L. (1971), Time and the space-traveller, Allen and Unwin, ISBN 9780045300174; Cites Einstein, Langevin, and the discussions after 1950; section 3 (differential aging), section 4 (criticism), section 6 (general relativity, free fall explanations)) derived the effect of time dilation which he applied to round-trips as follows:

From this there ensues the following peculiar consequence. [...] If one of two synchronous clocks at A is moved in a closed curve with constant velocity until it returns to A, the journey lasting $t$ seconds, then by the clock which has remained at rest the traveled clock on its arrival at A will be $\tfrac{1}{2}tv^{2}/c^{2}$ second slow. [Translation by Perret and Jefferies]

In a lecture from January 1911 (published November), Einstein extended this result to life forms:

If we placed a living organism in a box [...] one could arrange that the organism, after any arbitrary lengthy flight, could be returned to its original spot in a scarcely altered condition, while corresponding organisms which had remained in their original positions had already long since given way to new generations. For the moving organism, the lengthy time of the journey was a mere instant, provided the motion took place with approximately the speed of light. [Translation by Miller]

Two participants of this lecture, Rudolf Lämmel in April 1911 and Fritz Müller in October 1911, reported in newspaper articles that Einstein also talked about human observers making a journey near light speed who practically didn't age during the journey, yet as they return they meet later generations (Lämmel) or old men with gray beards (Müller). This experiment became particularly known (Note: During, É. (2014), "Langevin ou le paradoxe introuvable", Revue de métaphysique et de morale, 84 (4): 513–527, doi:10.3917/rmm.144.0513; Disusses some examples of the history until 1923 (Einstein, Langevin, Laue, Weyl, Painlevé, Bergson, Becquerel, Whitehead).) (Note: Canales, J. (2015), The Physicist and the Philosopher: Einstein, Bergson, and the Debate That Changed Our Understanding of Time, Princeton University Press, ISBN 978-1400865772; See particularly ch. 5 (criticism of Painlevé and Bergson).) (Note: Benguigui, L. G. (2020), A Tale Of Two Twins: The Langevin Experiment Of A Traveler To A Star, World Scientific, ISBN 9789811219115; See early solutions (Einstein, Langevin, Lorentz, Born/Kopff); Møller; Bergson controversy. A shorter version appeared in arXiv:1212.4414.) through a lecture by Langevin in April 1911 (published July), who independently stated that a portion of matter conducting a closed cycle will have aged less between its departure and its return than if it had not been accelerating, thus radium will have decayed less during the round-trip than a stationary sample, and a human traveler flying in a rocket and returning after 200 years Earth time will experience only 2 years during the flight. Independently, Wiechert in lectures between March and May 1911 (published July/September) discussed several round-trip clock experiments, including an experiment in which a human observer traveled for 300 Earth years on a circular path away and back to Earth, while he himself only experienced 75 years. Similarities between such experiments and fictional stories such as Rip Van Winkle, Urashima Tarō or When The Sleeper Wakes were noticed by several authors.

The round-trip experiment was explicitly formulated in terms of twins, i.e. two life forms of equal age, by the following authors: Wiechert (1911) spoke about "two life forms that begin their life at the same time", Paul Gruner (1912) about "two persons of same age", Laue (1913) about "former agemates", Weyl (1918) about "twin brothers", Werner Bloch (1918) about "two humans of exactly same age", and Einstein (1920) about "twins". For instance, the description of Weyl reads:

Suppose we have two twin-brothers who take leave from one another at a world-point A, and suppose one remains at home (that is, permanently at rest in an allowable reference-space), whilst the other sets out on voyages, during which he moves with velocities (relative to “home”) that approximate to that of light. When the wanderer returns home in later years he will appear appreciably younger than the one who stayed at home. [Translation by Henry Brose]

== Maximal proper time (1911) ==
After Einstein (1905) derived asymmetric clock aging along a closed polygonal path directly from the time dilation formula, more general treatments based on the proper time integral introduced by Hermann Minkowski (1907) followed. Langevin (1911–1919) showed that the integration of proper time leads to the result, that the time experienced by an accelerated observer traversing a closed path is shorter than for an observer in uniform motion. Also Wiechert (1911) noticed that the time difference in round-trip experiments can "easily" be derived by applying the proper time integral. Laue (December 1911) showed that asymmetric clock aging directly corresponds to the geometrical property of spacetime that among all time-like intervals connecting two events, the straight worldline has the maximal proper time as indicated by the clock that remained at rest in a single inertial frame, so differential aging is only about the different ways by which two points in spacetime are connected. Consequently, Laue (1912/13) employed the inequality

$$\tfrac{1}{c}\int_{1}^{2}\sqrt{du^{2}-\left(dx^{2}+dy^{2}+dz^{2}\right)}<\tfrac{1}{c}\int_{1}^{2}du$$,

in which the right-hand side represents the "maximal proper time" along a straight worldline, while the left-hand side represents smaller proper times of clocks along a broken worldline between the same events. This explanation was adopted by others such as Arnold Sommerfeld (1913), Weyl (1918), August Kopff (1921), Jean Becquerel (1922), with Wolfgang Pauli (1921) calling this the "four-dimensional formulation of the clock paradox".

Figure 1: Inverse triangle inequality (Robb, 1920).

In the simplest case where the traveler only once changes his direction in a very small time, Laue's inequality reduces to the inverse triangle inequality in Minkowski space formulated by Alfred Robb (1914), stating that the length of a particular side is longer than the combined lengths of the other sides, if all sides represent time-like intervals. In 1920, Robb gave a numerical example in which the time-like intervals AB=10, AC=3, CB=3 form the sides of triangle with the inequality $AC+CB<AB$ (Fig. 1). Arthur Eddington (1922) described those relations as "time-triangles" formed by moving clocks.

Several authors employed Minkowski diagrams to graphically demonstrate the round-trip experiment: Alexander von Brill (1920) demonstrated that the broken worldline $\overline{OA}$ + $\overline{AB}$ of the traveling clock has a smaller proper time than the straight one $\overline{OB}$ of the stationary clock; even though the worldlines drawn on paper apparently indicate the inequality $\overline{OAB}>\overline{OB}$, the computation of proper time actually gives $\overline{OB}>\overline{OAB}$ because the units on the traveler's axis are warped by $K=\sqrt{\tfrac{1-v^{2}}{1+v^{2}}}$. Pauli (1921) described the round-trip experiment in terms of two diagrams: In the first, two points P and Q are connected by a straight worldline $L_{1}$ and a broken worldline $L_{2}$; in the second, two points A and B are connected by a straight worldline $L$ and by a continuously curved one. The diagram of Max Born (1921) showed that at the outbound journey, traveler B experiences proper time interval OU on the inclined $t'$-axis while stationary observer A experiences proper time interval OQ on the vertical t-axis, with points U and Q located on the same hyperbola; at the inbound journey, however, observer B returns when his proper time is exactly the double of OU, whereas observer A returns when his proper time is more than the double of OQ.

== Negligibility of proper acceleration (1913) ==
Figure 2: Asymmetric aging despite identical velocity changes or accelerations (Wiechert, 1911).

It was pointed out that the acceleration experienced by the traveler (i.e. the proper acceleration) is neglectable when computing the round-trip experiment from the viewpoint of the inertial frame of the stay-at-home twin: Sommerfeld (1913) showed that the application of the proper time integral to the round-trip experiment rests on the "unprovable assumption" (which he attributed to Einstein) that the time indicated by the traveling clocks only depends on its momentary velocity (clock hypothesis). Laue (1912/13), Weyl (1918), Pauli (1921) avoided all practical problems related to the application of that integral to the travelling clock by demanding that the strength of acceleration must be sufficiently small. Einstein (1911, 1914, 1918), Laue (1913), Hans Thirring (1921), Born (1921) showed that even if there were an unknown influence of proper acceleration on the traveling clock's readings, this wouldn't necessarily change the conclusion that the traveling clock is retarded with respect to the stay-at-home clock when they reunite, because any such influence must be finite and therefore can be made arbitrarily small and negligible with respect to the effect of time dilation by arbitrarily elongating the duration of constant velocity motion. The same fact was demonstrated in an alternative way by Hendrik Lorentz (1913) who pointed out that any effect of acceleration of the traveling clock at turnaround can be separated from the time dilation effect since only the latter depends on the distance traversed along the round-trip, and also Pauli (1921) argued that any influence of acceleration at turnaround must be independent of the total travel time along the round-trip and is therefore easy to eliminate.

Wiechert (1911) showed that even when both clocks undergo the same velocity changes or accelerations in the round-trip experiment, asymmetric clock aging can arise when the clocks reunite: Clock A travels with $+u$ for a short time, then comes to rest at which it remains for a long time, and then returns with $-u$, while clock B traveled with $\pm u$ for a long time (see Fig. 2), in which case B will be retarded with respect to A at reunion. Likewise, Wiechert 1921 (published 1922) described the round-trip of clock B along a polygonal path away from stationary clock A and back again; then the experiment is repeated with exact same velocity changes as before, yet the size of the polygon should be arbitrarily increased; this implies that any influence on clocks during the velocity changes will affect the endresults of the two experiments in different proportion, which allows us to determine and eliminate that influence.

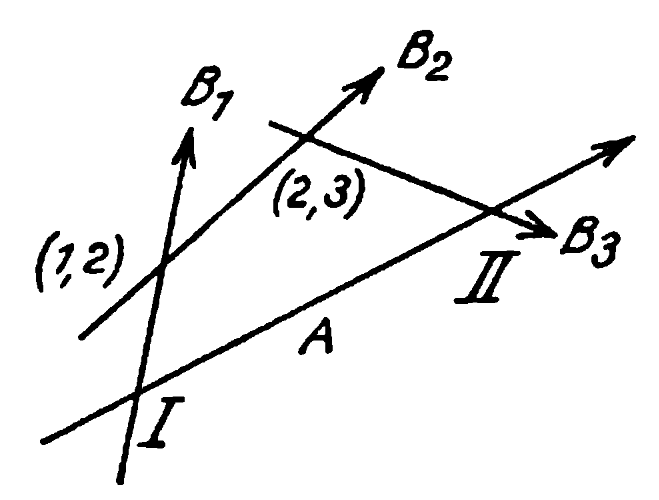
Figure 3: Relay experiment without acceleration (original drawing by Wiechert, 1922).

While discussing a one-way time dilation experiment in which the first clock had to be accelerated at the start in order to reach the second clock, Fritz Grünbaum (1911) showed that problems related to unknown influences of acceleration can be avoided by replacing the accelerated clock with a third, non-accelerated clock that is synchronized with the accelerated clock when they are momentarily co-located. Wiechert in 1920 (published 1921) applied the same idea to round-trip experiments by replacing the clocks or twins with three non-accelerated bodies A, B, C, on which the time is measured either by counting light oscillations or by determining the aging of life forms; A is passed by B that moves away in some direction, later B is passed by C that moves with same speed in the opposite direction, and finally C passes A; it turns out that the combined time measured on bodies B+C during those periods is smaller than the time measured on A alone. In 1921 (published 1922) Wiechert extended what he described as "relay" experiment (German: Stafette) to arbitrary many non-accelerated bodies $A,B_{1},B_{2},\dots$, in which the first B passes A at the beginning of the experiment and the last B passes A at the end of the experiment; it turns out that the combined time measured on all B bodies is smaller than the time measured on A alone (see Fig. 3 for the special case of three B clocks). Variants of this thought experiment became known as the three-brother experiments (Note: Discussion of Lord Halsbury and others in Debs, T. A., & Redhead, M. L. (1996), "The twin paradox and the conventionality of simultaneity", American Journal of Physics, 64 (1): 384–392, doi:10.1119/1.18252) in which the traveling clocks synchronize their times when they pass each other, as discussed by Luise Lange (1927) or Lord Halsbury (1957).

== Relativity principle and asymmetry (1911/12) ==
=== Paradox? ===
While Einstein (1905) described the round-trip experiment as "peculiar" (German: eigentümlich), Laue (1911/12) was the first to denote the round-trip experiment as "paradox":

Of all apparently paradox consequences that stem from the time-transformation of the theory of relativity, there is probably none against which the common sense of anyone who is still unfamiliar with the matter is more reluctant, than the one according to which the time indication of a clock shall be dependent on its state of motion. Already in his fundamental paper, Einstein has driven this paradox to the extreme by a thought experiment, recently explained in a very nice way by Langevin in a lecture that is also very readable in other respects. [...] The opposition against this, which at first will probably be raised in the mind of everyone, has recently caused two authors [Laue cites Otto Berg and Wiechert] to object at this place. [Translation on Wikisource]

Subsequently, Gruner (1912) and others including Einstein (1918) explicitly used the expression "clock paradox" (French: Paradoxe des horloges, German: Uhrenparadoxon), whereas Rudolf Seeliger (1913) spoke of the "familiar Einstein-Langevinian paradox" (German: "bekannte Einstein-Langevinsche Paradoxon"). Regarding the "twin paradox", Einstein (1920) is quoted as follows:

In the case of these two twins, Einstein declared, we have merely a paradox of feeling. It would be a paradox of thought only if no sufficient ground could be suggested for the behavior of these two creatures. [Translation by Brose]

In his relativity textbook, Born (1921) wrote

If we take up arms against this result and call it paradoxical, we simply mean that it is unusual, or "peculiar," and time will help us to conquer this strange feeling. But there are also opponents to the theory of relativity who seek to make of these conclusions an objection against the logical consistency of the theory [Translation by Brose].

=== Objections and their refutations ===
The papers of Laue ("Two Objections Against the Theory of Relativity and their Refutation", 1911) and Einstein ("Dialog about Objections against the Theory of Relativity", 1918) as well as the textbooks and papers of Bloch, Thirring, Born, etc. discuss and refute objections against the twin paradox such as:

a) Otto Berg (1910) claimed that the relativity principle demands complete symmetry of motions and travel times throughout the round-trip in both clock rest frames, thus the clocks must indicate the same time at reunion; he warned that "illustrative ideas such as the retardation of clocks can easily lead to mistakes at this place". Even staunch supporters of special relativity such as Norman Robert Campbell (1911/12) or Joseph Petzoldt (1914) (Note: Hentschel, K. (1990), Interpretationen und Fehlinterpretationen der speziellen und der allgemeinen Relativitätstheorie durch Zeitgenossen Albert Einsteins, Basel—Boston—Bonn: Birkhäuser, doi:10.18419/opus-7182, ISBN 978-3-7643-2438-4; See pp. 253ff (critical realism), pp. 282ff (fictionalism), pp. 168ff & 418ff (Petzoldt), pp. 448ff (Bergson), p. 531 (Metz versus Bergson)) required full symmetry, claiming that any time difference during the outbound journey that emerges from the Lorentz transformation due to increasing velocity and distance, vanishes during the inbound journey as differences in velocity and distance are decreasing; this was popularized by the (then famous) philosopher Henri Bergson (1922) who claimed that relativity requires symmetric experience of "lived time" and therefore equal age for both twins during and after the round-trip, because temporal differences between frames are "fictions" which are just as real as the smaller height of a receding person who will regain his original height as he returns (see Einstein-Bergson debate). Similar arguments were also given during the Dingle controversy in 1956 and later. (Note: Chang, H. (1993), "A misunderstood rebellion: the twin-paradox controversy and Herbert Dingle's vision of science", Studies in History and Philosophy of Science Part A, 24 (5): 741–790, doi:10.1016/0039-3681(93)90063-P; Covering the Dingle controversy starting in 1955.)

This was refuted by the historical authors in section § Maximal proper time (1911) who showed that relativity doesn't predict equal aging in the standard round-trip scenario, and in sections §§ Acceleration asymmetry and Frame distribution asymmetry they showed that asymmetric aging does not contradict the relativity principle.

b) Wiechert (1911) demonstrated that asymmetric clock aging in the round-trip experiment definitely follows from the relativistic formulas; yet since this effect only depends on the periods of constant velocity motion while accelerations at turnaround can be neglected in the computation, he concluded that this proves the inequivalence or anisotropy of non-accelerated motions with respect to a Lorentzian aether in contradiction to Einstein's "unconditional" relativity principle that allegedly requires equivalence and symmetry of motions and frames along the round-trip. A similar mistake was made by the notorious anti-relativist Ernst Gehrcke (1912/13) (Note: Rowe, D. E. (2006), "Einstein's allies and enemies: Debating relativity in Germany 1916–1920", Interactions: Mathematics, Physics and Philosophy, Boston Studies in the Philosophy of Science, vol. 251, Springer, pp. 231–280, doi:10.1007/978-1-4020-5195-1_8, ISBN 978-1-4020-5194-4; Covering the criticism of Gehrcke starting with 1912; discussion between Einstein and Gehrcke in 1914; Einstein's dialogue (1918) as response to antirelativists; the Weyland event in 1920 and Einstein's response.) who claimed that the slowing down of the rates of moving clocks requires recourse to "absolute translation" in contradiction to the relativity of uniform motion. Also Bergson (1922) claimed that when physicists derive asymmetric aging in the round-trip experiment, they inadvertently think in terms of Lorentz's "semi relativity" based on absolute space while forgetting that Einstein's "complete relativity" requires symmetry of motions and experienced time of both twins during uniform outbound and inbound journey.

This was refuted by Laue in sections §§ Maximal proper time (1911) and Frame distribution asymmetry, who showed why asymmetric aging does not require any inequivalent/anisotropic non-accelerated motions with respect to an absolute space or aether by pointing out its geometric nature.

c) Gruner (March 1912) claimed that the relativity principle requires complete symmetry of time dilation between the twins and therefore mutual attribution of younger age at reunion, which represents an "irreducible and inconceivable contradiction", because person A can say that B was in motion and returns in a less developed state than A, while person B can say with same right that A was in motion and returned in a less developed state than B. Similarly, Gehrcke (May 1912) claimed that in the first case clock B was in motion and is retarded with respect to A at reunion, while in the second case clock A was in motion and is retarded with respect to B at reunion, thus two relativistically identical cases give different results in contradiction to the relativity principle. During a discussion with Einstein and Langevin, also Paul Painlevé (1922) claimed that on one hand the train clock was in motion and is retarded with respect to the station clock at reunion, yet the relativity principle also allows to say that the station clock was in motion and is retarded with respect to the train clock at reunion, in contradiction to the previous result.

This was refuted by the historical authors in section § Perspective of the traveler, who showed where and why the symmetry of time dilation is broken during the round-trip.

=== Acceleration asymmetry ===
Figure 4: No symmetry as one of them accelerates (Langevin, 1911) or rests in more than one inertial frame (Laue, 1911).

While it was known (see section § Negligibility of proper acceleration (1913)) that any influence of proper acceleration can be neglected in the context of computing the age difference in the inertial frame of the stay-at-home twin, the same authors noticed that acceleration is still useful as an absolute asymmetry indicator in the context of explaining why the symmetry between the twins is broken in the first place. (Note: J.B. Kennedy (2014). Space, Time and Einstein: An Introduction (revised ed.). Routledge. p. 39. ISBN 978-1-317-48944-3.; Extract of page 39: "Of course, the acceleration does not directly cause the asymmetry. The acceleration determines the path of the astronaut twin, and it is this path that determines the age difference. The asymmetry of the acceleration causes an asymmetry in the motions of the twins, and this causes the asymmetry between the ages.") Langevin (1911) described the twin paradox as "another example of the absolute character of acceleration" in which the "asymmetry occurred because only the traveler, in the middle of his journey, has undergone an acceleration that changes the direction of his velocity". Sommerfeld (1913) formulated the clock hypothesis according to which only momentary velocities count when the proper time is computed in the round-trip experiment; yet the time difference between the clocks at reunion doesn't indicate "motion" but rather "accelerated motion" since one of them had to be accelerated in order to come back, thus there is no contradiction to the relativity principle. Einstein (1914) explained that while accelerations are irrelevant for the computation of the time difference, their "presence nevertheless causes the slowing down of clock B and not that of clock A" because "accelerated motions are absolute in the theory of relativity". Lorentz (1913), Einstein (1918), Pauli (1921), Kopff (1921), Born (1921) all stated that the acceleration of the traveling clock B can be neglected or eliminated in the computation of its retardation with respect to the stay-at-home clock A; yet the fact that only the frame of A is inertial while the frame of B was temporarily accelerated shows that there is no contradiction to the special relativity principle, since it doesn't require symmetry between inertial and accelerated frames (see §§ Inertial frame analysis and Accelerated frame analysis for quantitative analyses). The different roles of acceleration were also discussed by Hans Thirring (1921) who showed that on one hand the acceleration of clock B can indeed be neglected in the computation of its retardation with respect to A; yet if A were the accelerated one, it would be A that is retarded with respect to B at reunion, thus acceleration is "responsible" for the time difference after all. Einstein summarized the reason why there is no contradiction as follows in an interview from 1920 as follows:

In the case of these two twins, Einstein declared, we have merely a paradox of feeling. It would be a paradox of thought only if no sufficient ground could be suggested for the behavior of these two creatures. This ground, which accounts for the comparative youth of A, is given, from the point of view of the special theory of relativity, by the fact that the creature in question, and only this creature, has been subject to accelerations. [Translation by Brose]

=== Frame distribution asymmetry ===
Laue (1911–13) described the asymmetry in Fig. 4 purely in terms of spacetime geometry and the different distribution of inertial rest frames without emphasizing the role of acceleration: Only one clock rests in a single inertial frame throughout as it follows a straight worldline, while the other one rested in at least two inertial frames as it follows a broken worldline. Bloch (1918) represented the frames with three movable slots K, K' and K”, provided with hooks on which one can hang clocks at the origins of K and K'; while one clock always hangs on a hook of slot K, the other clock moved away with K' and after some time was transferred (neglecting any effect of acceleration) by a mechanical device to slot K” that moves in the other direction, by which it comes back; there is no contradiction to the relativity principle, as one clock rested in one inertial frame while the other one rested in two such frames. André Metz (1923) represented the three frames by using Earth and two mechanical sidewalks transporting people in opposite directions; Pierre remains on Earth, while Paul and Jean together travel away on the first sidewalk with uniform speed; while Jean continues his journey, Paul jumps (neglecting any effect of acceleration) to the other sidewalk and returns to Pierre where they discover that Paul's clock is retarded; thus while Jean remained symmetric with Pierre the entire time, Paul who changed sidewalks is neither symmetric with Jean nor with Pierre.

Laue (1911/12) went on to show that this result does not imply anisotropy of non-accelerated motions as claimed by Wiechert (objection b) by restating the asymmetry in terms of spacetime geometry:

The principle of relativity claims the equivalence of all time-like directions in [Minkowski space]. Einstein's experiment, however, is represented by a curved worldline, which in a worldpoint A decomposes into a row of curves, and all of them will be re-united at a worldpoint B to a single line. Of all curves connecting the points A and B having time-like direction throughout, the straight connection has the longest proper time; that is the meaning of Einstein's consideration. That of all time-like directions, one is preferred in this way, is to be admitted; however, this preference is not based on the natural laws employed, but only on the choice of world-points A and B, i.e. on the special assumptions of our example. [..] One of the most important physical findings is the physical equivalence of all directions in (three-dimensional) space; and one of the most elementary geometric laws says, that two points determine a straight line, and thus a direction as well. It would be in accordance with the previous objection [of Wiechert] against the relativity theory, when one would try to refute that law of the isotropy of space by the aid of that geometric theorem. [Translation on Wikisource]

== Perspective of the traveler ==
=== Inertial frame analysis ===
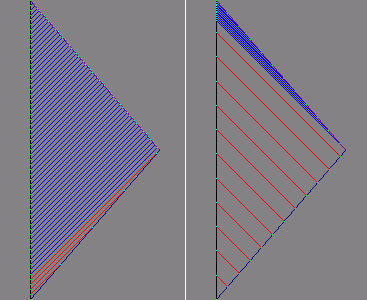
Figure 5: Asymmetry during signal exchange (Langevin, 1911).

Assuming that the turnaround happened in negligible time, the asymmetry in the perspective of the traveler has been described in terms of the two inertial frames in which he was at rest during the outbound and inbound journey: Langevin (1911) applied the relativistic Doppler effect to one-way signals and found, that the wavelength of signals sent from the rocket to Earth is seen by the latter to be elongated for 200 years before turnaround but contracted only for 2 days after turnaround; on the other hand, the traveler sees the wavelength of Earth's signals elongated for one year and immediately after turnaround he sees it contracted for another year; thus 200 years were spent on Earth but only 2 years in the rocket. Directly addressing and refuting objection c, Lorentz (1913) described both perspectives as follows: In the frame of the resting observer the ordinary time dilation formula predicts that the traveler's clock is retarded by the factor $\sqrt{1-v^{2}/c^{2}}$ throughout the round-trip; then he showed the perspective of the traveler who uses two-way signals (radar) that were sent and received by him during three periods: In the first (signals are sent and received before turnaround) and the last (signals are sent and received after turnaround) the stay-at-home clock is observed to be dilated by the factor $\sqrt{1-v^{2}/c^{2}}$, yet in the middle period (signals are sent before turnaround, but received after turnaround) the stay-at-home clock is observed to be faster by the factor $\sqrt{\tfrac{c+v}{c-v}}$, which overcompensates the other periods and explains why the traveler's clock is retarded at reunion even from his own perspective.

Figure 6: The traveler's hypersurface of simultaneity changes from blue to red at turnaround through application of the Lorentz transformation (Thirring, 1921) or by the equivalence principle (Einstein, 1918).

Also addressing and refuting objection c, Thirring (1921) applied the Lorentz transformation and showed that relativity of simultaneity leads to desynchronization of all the traveler's clocks during turnaround from $t'=\gamma\left(t-vx/c^{2}\right)$ to $t'-t'_{0}=\gamma\left(t+vx/c^{2}\right)$, in which $t'_{0}$ is a constant that depends on the clock after which the other clocks should be resynchronised after turnaround; this leads to an apparent forward jump (Fig. 6) of the stay-at-home clock which overcompensates its time dilation during constant velocity motion, all of which was visualized by Thirring using diagrams. Similarly, Langevin (1922) gave a thorough algebraic treatment in terms of a train conductor clock moving along a railway; setting $x=vt$ as turnaround point and assuming that all clocks in the train are resynchronized after the train conductor clock, he determined Thirring's constant as $-\gamma2tv^{2}/c^{2}$; the train conductor consequently notices that all clocks along the railway he passes by during the round-trip are advanced with respect to his own clock. Both of them showed the analogy to explanations employing the equivalence principle (see § Accelerated frame analysis): Thirring pointed out that his method gives an elementary explanation of the gravitational redshift at locations of lower potential since clocks at those locations fell behind due to desynchronization, and Langevin pointed out that even if the traveler would have slept during turnaround, the desynchronization of clocks would have informed him about the presence of a gravitational field. According to Hans Reichenbach (1921), Thirring's method that "avoids gravitational fields" by introducing an asymmetry due to momentary acceleration and desynchronization, leads to an "objective distinction" of the accelerated system, whereas the explanation in terms of gravitational fields represents the "relativized view".

The explanation of Thirring and Langevin was used by other authors as well: Jean Becquerel (1923) described a rocket passing a row of desynchronized and advanced Earth clocks; at turnaround the rocket clock indicates 2 hours while a co-located Earth clock indicates 4 hours, and at reunion the rocket clock indicates 4 hours while the Earth clock indicates 8 hours. Metz (1923) used moving sidewalks of 100 million kilometers length that move along desynchronized and advanced Earth clocks; at turnaround the traveler's clock is 1 minute behind a co-located Earth clock, and at reunion the traveler's clock is 2 minutes behind the Earth clock. Alfred North Whitehead (1923) showed that while Earth conducts 200 times 365 revolutions from departure until return of the traveler, the traveler counted only 7.3 Earth revolutions during the outbound and inbound journey, whereas the remaining 72992.7 revolutions occurred during his frame/simultaneity jump.

A simplified description that doesn't require the full Lorentz transformation was given by William McCrea (1951) using Lorentz contraction: The stay-at-home observer remains at rest and plots the length $X=vT$ during the outward as well as inward motion of the traveler, resulting in the total travel time $2T$. As long as the traveler is at rest with respect to the stay-at-home observer, he will plot the same distance $X$, yet when he starts to move he will instantly plot the contracted distance $X\sqrt{1-v^{2}/c^{2}}$ in both the outward- and inward journey, leading to a shorter total travel time of $2T\sqrt{1-v^{2}/c^{2}}$ when he returns.

=== Accelerated frame analysis ===
After completion of general relativity, the perspective of the traveler has also been described in terms the accelerated frame in which he rests even during turnaround: (Note: Janssen, M. (2012), "The twins and the bucket: How Einstein made gravity rather than motion relative in general relativity", Studies in History and Philosophy of Science Part B, 43 (3): 159–175, doi:10.1016/j.shpsb.2012.01.003 See section 2.1) Einstein (1918) wrote a dialogue, in which the "critic" claimed that general relativity requires complete symmetry of motions and frames during the round-trip so that objection c "rises from the ashes" again, which was refuted by the "relativist" using the equivalence principle, according to which uniformly accelerated frames are equivalent to homogeneous gravitational fields. Einstein's solution published in a popular science journal didn't include formulas, but they can be found in one of his letters from the same year where he based his analysis on the approximate formulas that he derived as early as 1907/8 in his first paper on the equivalence principle. The solution was immediately adopted in the textbooks of Bloch (1920), Pauli (1921), Kopff (1921), Born (1921), Karl Bollert (1922a): In the frame of the traveling clock U2, a homogeneous gravitational field appears at turnaround, which is accompanied by gravitational time dilation $\sigma=\tau\left(1+gl/c^{2}\right)$ with $l=vt$ as distance between the clocks and $g$ as acceleration and $gl=\Phi$ as the difference in gravitational potential. Since the free falling stay-at-home clock U1 is at a location of higher potential than stationary clock U2 during turnaround, U1 advances by $2lv/c^{2}$ with respect to U2 (Fig. 6), which overcompensates U1's approximated retardation $lv/c^{2}$ during its constant velocity motion. Subsequently, Bollert (1922b) described the solution in terms of the more general formula ${\scriptstyle d\sigma=d\tau\sqrt{\left(1+gl/c^{2}\right)^{2}-\left(dx/d\tau\right)^{2}}}$ that also incorporates the velocity of U1 during free fall. An exact treatment was given by Christian Møller (1943) who discussed a case involving constant proper acceleration (hyperbolic motion), describing the accompanied accelerated frame and its homogeneous gravitational field in terms of Kottler–Møller coordinates. An alternative method to describe the accelerated frame was introduced by Lass (1963) using what was later identified with Radar coordinates.

Regarding the occurrence of the gravitational field at turnaround, Einstein (1918) provided two explanations: First, he argued that the term "gravitational field" has a rather indirect meaning in general relativity, thus one doesn't necessarily has to assume that this field is caused by the presence of masses; or second, he argued that it is possible that the relative acceleration of all stars of the universe might have induced the field (Mach's principle). The latter was adopted by Kopff (1921) who pointed out that in the inertial frame of stationary clock A, clock B experiences forces and accelerates relative to A and the stationary masses of the universe, while in the accelerated frame of B, clock A and the masses of the universe are accelerating while B is held at rest by the same forces as before. Thirring (1921) added that the traveler's frame can be interpreted in two ways: Either it is considered as accelerating in which case inertial forces arise in it, or it is considered as being at rest in which case gravitational forces arise due to relative acceleration of the distant masses.

Some authors argued that the accelerated frame analysis and general relativity are necessary in order to complete the solution indicated in section § Acceleration asymmetry: Einstein (1918) stated that there is no contradiction in special relativity because only one clock is always at rest in an inertial frame while the other one is accelerated; yet after describing the accelerated frame at turnaround in terms of gravitational fields and general relativity, he stated that "by this consideration, the paradox is completely resolved." Einstein (1920) stated that in special relativity the reason of the asymmetry between the twins lies in the acceleration of one of them; yet he continued that "a proper grasp of the reason is furnished only when we adopt the general theory of relativity" which shows that a "centrifugal field" only arises in the frame of the traveler but not in the frame of the resting twin. Bloch (1920) stated that there is no contradiction in special relativity since one of them is in two inertial frames; yet since the combination of two inertial frames constitutes an accelerated frame that cannot be dealt with in special relativity, only general relativity can provide the "proper and satisfying solution". Pauli (1921) stated that there is no contradiction in special relativity since one of them is accelerating; yet in order to describe the accelerated frame of the traveler at turnaround, the influence of (coordinate) acceleration on the stay-at-home clock cannot be neglected as it is not caused by an external force but by an inertial force, thus he concluded that "the complete solution of the problem can naturally only been given in the framework of general relativity". Born (1921) stated that there is no contradiction in special relativity since one of them is accelerating; then he gave "the complete explanation of the clock paradox" that also includes the accelerated frame of the traveler and concluded that "the clock paradox is due to a false application of the special theory of relativity to a case in which the general theory should be applied".

However, many physicists reject the idea that general relativity is necessary to complete the solution: (Note: Weiss, W. (Physics FAQ): The Twin Paradox: The Equivalence Principle Analysis) (Note: Gibbs, P. (Physics FAQ): Can Special Relativity Handle Acceleration?) (Note: Koks, D. (Physics FAQ): Where is the Boundary between Special and General Relativity?) As the round-trip described above is entirely formulated in the framework of flat Minkowski space of special relativity, and because special relativity can perfectly handle accelerated frames such as Rindler coordinates, the accelerated frame solution is not an application of general relativity as a theory of gravitation in curved spacetime, but rather relies on pseudo-gravitational fields that pop up by transforming into the accelerated frame, thus special relativity is sufficient to discuss the twin paradox. Regarding Mach's principle, it is not clear whether it is compatible with the theory of relativity. (Note: Bondi, H., & Samuel, J. (1997), "The Lense-Thirring effect and Mach's principle", Physics Letters A, 228 (3): 121–126, arXiv:gr-qc/9607009, doi:10.1016/S0375-9601(97)00117-5)

== Curved spacetime (1922) ==
Contrary to the previous examples, general relativity is required when spacetime curvature caused by mass and energy cannot be neglected any longer. An early discussion of a round-trip experiment in curved spacetime was provided by Jean Becquerel (1922) in terms of the Schwarzschild formula $d\tau=\sqrt{1-\tfrac{2GM}{c^{2}r}}dt$, where $G$ is the gravitational constant, $M$ the mass of the spherical central body, and $r$ the distance between test body and central body. In his example, two identical clocks A and B are placed next to each other at a point very far from the material center, initially marking the same time $t$; when A is transported closer to the central mass where the field is more intense, it will measure time $\int d\tau$ which is shorter than $\int dt$ measured by B; when A is brought back to B, it will be retarded with respect to B.

Campbell (1935) used the Schwarzschild metric to show that general relativity allows for cases in which the accelerated clock will be the older one when it returns to Earth; for instance, clocks whose orbit around a body is disturbed by forces can indicate larger elapsed proper times at reunion with respect to clocks orbiting undisturbed (i.e in free fall) around the same body. Other authors investigated cases in which both clocks are in free fall without experiencing proper acceleration, yet according to the Schwarzschild metric they will nevertheless age differently. For instance, Mikhail (1952) gave an "example in which the two observers are attached to two test-particles moving freely in the field of a gravitating mass; one of these makes complete revolutions in a circular orbit while the other moves radially outwards and inwards. The time-interval between two successive encounters is shorter in the reckoning of the former than in that of the latter."
