= Luise Lange =

German-American physicist (1891–1978)

Luise Lange (Note: Sometimes written as Louise Lange) (April 14, 1891 – 1978) was a German-American physicist. She is known for her work in molecular physics and the theory of relativity. She was the first to measure the electric dipole moment of a solution. She is also known for defending the solutions of the twin paradox in special relativity against philosophical refutations at the time.

== Life ==
Luise Lange was born in Braunschweig, Germany on April 14, 1891. She studied in Braunschweig University of Technology and later at the University of Göttingen.

In Göttingen, Lange was assistant of David Hilbert and annotated his course on statistical mechanics (German: Vorlesung zur Statistisches Mechanik) of the summer semester 1914. She was also present during Albert Einstein's 1915 talk at Göttingen. Her work supervised by Peter Debye led to her doctorate degree from the University of Göttingen in 1923. Her doctoral examiners were Debye, chemist Adolf Windaus and mathematician Constantin Carathéodory.

She later emigrated to the United States, working at Oxford Female College between 1921 and 1926. According to a student newspaper Lange did "calculations for manufacturers of physics instruments" before coming to the College.

Later she worked at Miami University and Woodrow Wilson Junior College in Chicago. She died in 1978.

== Research ==
=== Molecular dipoles ===
Lange worked under the supervision of Peter Debye at the University of Göttingen, she was the first to measure the electric dipole moment of molecules in solution in 1918 by determining the concentration dependence on polarization. The work was published in later 1925. Further work on this topic was accelerated by Debye who organized a discussion on the topic in Leipzig in 1928 and republished the results in his book Polar Molecules in 1929.

In 1936, Debye was awarded the Nobel Prize in Chemistry, in his Nobel lecture he cited the work of Lange.

=== Special relativity ===
In 1905, in his annus mirabilis paper Einstein discussed the discrepancy in clocks when moving relatively to each other and extended its implications to living organisms in 1911. The same year, Paul Langevin extended the discussion to the age of two bodies of matter. Hermann Weyl was the first to refer to two twin brothers in 1918, leading to the concept of the twin paradox.

In the 1920s, many philosophers and physicists raised criticism on the theory of relativity of Albert Einstein. Henri Bergson used this paradox to criticise Einstein during the Einstein–Bergson debate in 1922. In 1927, Lange published two works "The Clock Paradox of the Theory of Relativity" and "On a Misconception of the Relativity of Time" in defense of Einstein. Contrary to some authors, Lange defended that the twin paradox did not invalidate relativity.

In her first paper, Lange refuted the arguments of Bergson and others who claimed that the twin paradox is contradictory. She started by giving one of the first demonstrations of the twin paradox without proper acceleration, which later became known as the three-brother experiment, writing:

p. 25: We consider it first in the form of the traveler who "changes trains", but to deal with motions free throughout from accelerations we avoid the jump from one system to the other; instead, we leave Paul attached to his first system and place another observer, James, on the one moving oppositely, who sets his clock in accordance with Paul's when he passes him, on t"=t'=1. Now we have to distinguish three different uniform systems, S, S', S". The systems S' and S" move relatively to S with velocities ±v [...] The conclusion now that time in the double-system S'-S" flows twice as slow as in S was based on the consideration that, as both move with the same numerical velocity relatively to S, the time elapsing in either of them in going from A to B and back from B to A is the same.

She then showed that also in the ordinary twin paradox, no contradiction arises if the relativity of simultaneity derived from the Lorentz transformation between events is carefully considered. Subsequently she discussed the solution of Max von Laue and others in terms of proper time in Minkowski space, discussed Einstein's solution in terms of general relativity, and criticized all descriptions that were based on acceleration. In her second paper, she refuted the misunderstandings by Ernst Gehrcke and Karl Vogtherr, who claimed that relativity makes contradictory statements as to the outcome of experiments, depending on which frame one uses to predict that outcome. Lange again showed that there are no contradictions if the relativity of simultaneity is carefully considered.

=== Base-12 numbers ===
Lange wrote names for the duodecimal numeral system in 1936, but acknowledged that moving from base-10 to base-12 was unrealistic. Her system is summarized in the following table:

Base-12	Base-12 name	Base-10	Base-10 name
1	one	1	one
2	two	2	two
9	nine	9	nine
ξ	ten	10	ten
ε	eleven	11	eleven
10	twelve	12	twelve
11	onetwelve	13	thirteen
12	twotwelve	14	fourteen
19	ninetwelve	21	twenty-one
1ξ	tentwelve	22	twenty-two
1ε	eleventwelve	23	twenty-three
20	twendo	24	twenty-four
30	thirdo	36	thirty-six
90	ninedo	108	one hundred eight
100	gen	144	one hundred forty-four
1000	dou	1728	one thousand seven hundred twenty-eight
10^{6}	mir	12^{6}	
10^{9}	bir	12^{9}	
10^{12}	trir	10^{12}	

For example, duodecimal 94ξ612 (decimal: 2340590) would be read nine-gen-fourdo-ten-dou six-gen-twotwelve.

== Personal life ==
At Göttingen, Lange was friend of mathematician Richard Courant and used to visit his house. According to the auto-biography of Courant's cousin Edith Stein, rumors surfaced that his wife Nelli Neumann was divorcing Courant in part due to his involvement with Lange. During their divorce trial in 1916, Lange was mentioned but Courant dismissed any involvement with Lange. Stein states "To avoid as much as possible any mention of his connection with her and to protect her reputation, he himself had provided other grounds which incriminated him." When Stein later asked him about his relationship with Lange, he answered "It was something perhaps not compatible with a completely ideal marriage."

== See also ==
- History of the twin paradox
