= Enrique Loedel Palumbo =

Enrique Loedel Palumbo (Montevideo Uruguay, June 29, 1901 – La Plata Argentina, July 31, 1962) was an Uruguayan physicist.

Loedel Palumbo was born in Montevideo, Uruguay and studied at the University of La Plata in Argentina. His doctoral advisor was the German physicist of Jewish origin Richard Gans. Loedel wrote his Ph.D. thesis in December 1925 on optical and electrical constants of sugar cane. An extract of the thesis was published in German in Annalen der Physik in 1926. He then began his career as professor in La Plata.

During Einstein's visit to Argentina in 1925 they had a conversation about the differential equation of a point-source gravitational field, which resulted in a paper published by Loedel in Physikalische Zeitschrift. It is claimed that this is the first research paper on relativity ever published by a Latin American scientist.

Loedel Palumbo then spent some time in Germany working with Erwin Schrödinger and Max Planck. He returned to Argentina in 1930 and from there on concentrated on teaching. He published several scientific papers during his career in international journals and wrote several books (in Spanish).

== Loedel diagram ==
The Loedel frame is a resting frame showing two moving frames with equal speeds in opposite directions. The two sets of parallel lines represent simultaneous events, one set for each moving frame.

Max Born (1920) and systematically Paul Gruner (1921) introduced symmetric Minkowski diagrams in German and French papers, where the ct'-axis is perpendicular to the x-axis, as well as the ct-axis perpendicular to the x'-axis (for sources and historical details, see Loedel diagram).

In 1948 and in subsequent papers, Loedel independently rediscovered such diagrams. (Note: Fisica relativista, Kapelusz Editorial, Buenos Aires, Argentina (1955).) They were again rediscovered in 1955 by Henri Amar, who subsequently wrote in 1957 in American Journal of Physics: "I regret my unfamiliarity with South American literature and wish to acknowledge the priority of Professor Loedel's work", along with a note by Loedel Palumbo citing his publications on the geometrical representation of Lorentz transformations. Those diagrams are therefore called "Loedel diagrams", and have been cited by some textbook authors on the subject.

Suppose there are two collinear velocities v and w. How does one find the frame of reference in which the velocities become equal speeds in opposite directions? One solution uses modern algebra to find it: Suppose $\tanh \ a \ =\ v/c$ and $\tanh \ b \ = \ w/c$, so that a and b are rapidities corresponding to velocities v and w. Let m = (a + b)/2, the midpoint rapidity. The transformation

$$z \mapsto z e^{-mj}$$

of the split-complex number plane represents the required transformation since $e^{aj} \mapsto e^{(a-b)j/2}$ and $e^{bj} \mapsto e^{(b-a)j/2}.$ As the exponents are additive inverses of each other, the images represent equal speeds in opposite directions.

== Publications ==
- Física Elemental, Estrada Editorial, Argentina (1941).
- Cosmografía (o Elementos de Astronomía), Editorial Estrada, Argentina, 1941.
- Loedel, Enrique (1930). "Ueber die Quantifizierte Rotation der Atome". Physikalische Zeitschrift. 31: 926–929.
- "Versos de un físico. Física y razón vital.", La Plata, 1934.
- "El convencionalismo en el problema de las magnitudes físicas", Actas del Primer Congreso Nacional de Filosofía (Mendoza 1949), Universidad Nacional de Cuyo, Buenos Aires 1950, tomo III, págs. 1559-1564. (Sesiones: VIII. Epistemología y filosofía de la naturaleza.)
- "Lógica y Metafísica", conference about causality given at the University of La Plata (date undocumented).
- Enseñanza de la Física, Editorial Kapelusz, Buenos Aires, Argentina (1949).
- Física relativista, Editorial Kapelusz, Buenos Aires, Argentina, 1955.
