= Einstein–Bergson debate =

1922 debate on physics and philosophy

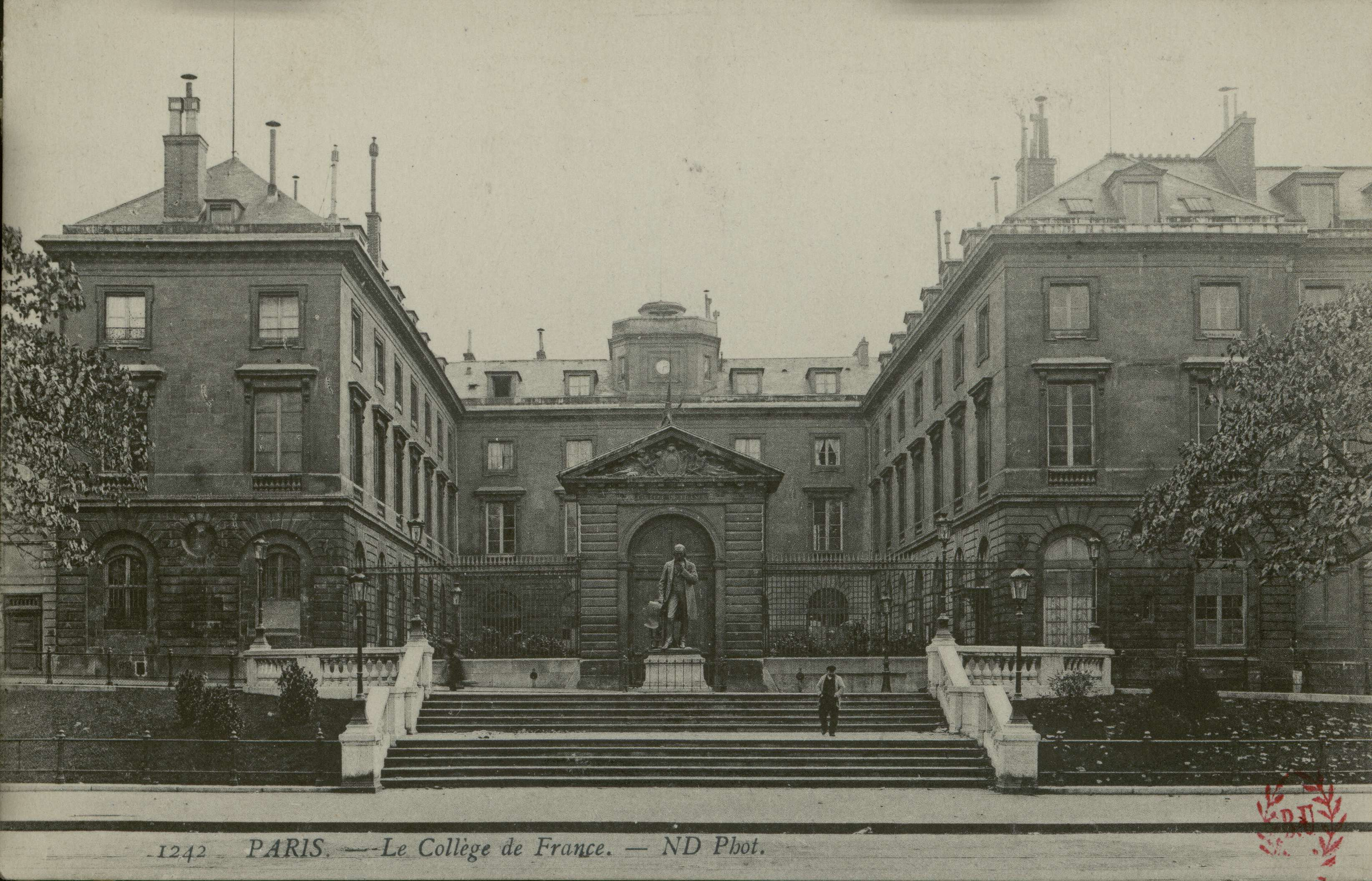
The Collège de France in Paris, where the initial debate took place

On April 6, 1922, the physicist Albert Einstein and the philosopher Henri Bergson met at a gathering of the Société française de philosophie and debated the implications of the theory of relativity on the nature of time.

Bergson argued that while relativity is valid within the domain of physics, it cannot account for duration (la durée), or time as it is actually lived and experienced, and that philosophy still has indispensable contributions to make beyond what science can offer. Einstein rejected this, drawing a sharp distinction between physical and psychological time and dismissing any intermediate philosophical category, famously remarking: "The time of the philosophers does not exist" (French: Il n'y a donc pas un temps des philosophes).

The exchange, and the broader discussion it triggered, has had wide-ranging implications for Western cosmology and for the prestige of the humanities as compared to science. In 1934, Paul Valéry wrote that the meeting between these two thinkers was the "grande affaire" of the twentieth century.

== Context ==
=== Bergson ===
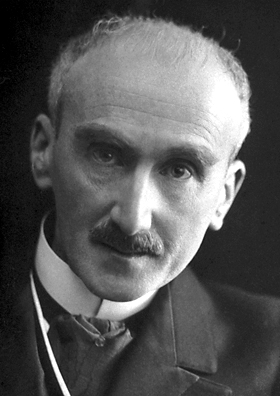
Henri Bergson in 1927

Henri Bergson was widely viewed as an epoch-defining thinker. For William James, Bergson's Creative Evolution was a work as important for Western philosophy as those of George Berkeley or Immanuel Kant; Jean Wahl concurs, placing Bergson alongside Plato, René Descartes and Kant as one of "the four great philosophers". A cult of personality developed around Bergson following the 1907 publication of Creative Evolution: students would make "mystical pilgrimages" to his summer home in Switzerland; he was referred to as "an enchanter" and "the greatest thinker in the world". His biographer Emily Herring refers to him as being in the early twentieth century "the most famous philosopher in the world". Bergson had a deep influence on the arts: facets of his thinking fascinated Modernists from Virginia Woolf and T.S. Eliot to the Italian Futurists. He captured the imagination of the wider public as well: his lectures were immensely popular with Parisian society, especially with women (a fact which led to accusations by contemporary critics that his thought was incurably irrationalist and his style effeminate), and, according to legend, the first traffic jam on New York City's Broadway was caused by a lecture Bergson was going to give at Columbia University.

At the heart of Bergson's philosophy is the élan vital, an evolutionary impulse he proposes is behind all change. The élan vital (sometimes translated as "vital impulse") is the energy of life understood as pure creation struggling against entropy and decay. Such a principle is logically called for, according to Bergson, because traditional mechanistic and teleological explanations of change struggle to account for true creative progress, which requires something to be added to the evolving being that was not already latent before. "Life, like conscious activity, is invention, is unceasing creation," Bergson writes in Creative Evolution. For him, only true creativity can explain the diverse products of evolution in consideration of the continuity of life. The true nature of time, which Bergson calls duration [la durée], is an effect of consciousness where memory accrues and penetrates into the present, meaning that no moment presented to a being can ever be the same as one experienced before. Time is therefore not the series of discrete states of being which our senses inscribe as time, and which Bergson compares to colored beads on the string of the ego. Because the senses are a product of evolution, they cannot comprehend the process of evolution itself; they arose as practical means of understanding how a being can act on a given object, and perceive only that potential for action. Intellect, which is essentially quantitative and pragmatic, cannot understand the qualitative nature of duration and the élan vital; according to Bergson, intellect tends to think of time in terms of space. His philosophy therefore places a specific sort of intuition over intellect in its immediacy of access to reality. This intuition would be a sort of sympathy which would penetrate the object, rather than perceiving only its exterior.

Bergson's philosophy had always had important critics. Bertrand Russell mounted a years-long polemic against Bergson, accusing the latter of anti-intellectualism and poetic vagueness; he specifically objects to a supposed "confusion between an act of knowing and that which is known," and to the political implications of Bergson's doctrine of intuition. In a memorable quip, Russell writes that "intellect is the misfortune of man, while instinct is seen at its best in ants, bees, and Bergson." Isaiah Berlin criticized Bergson as having contributed to the "abandonment of rigorous critical standards and the substitution in their place of casual emotional responses." Georgi Plekhanov wrote an important Marxist critique of Bergson that centers on Bergson's severing of creative power from the force of history. The Catholic Church placed Bergson's works on its Index of Prohibited Books.

When Einstein first expounded his theory of relativity, Bergson was sympathetic, and believed in "the agreement between relativity and my views on space and spatial time." In 1912, Henri Poincaré, an important precursor of relativity theory, had stated that "[t]he time of scientists comes out of Bergsonian duration." Bergson devoted careful study to the mathematics underlying the theory. However, he soon perceived that Einstein's understanding of time would have to be set apart from his own; though he accepted it in the field of physics, he believed that relativity could not be seen as governing the lived experience of time. He would seek to argue that Einstein's theory grafts metaphysics onto science, and should be seen as viable within the abstract domain of physics, but not in the reality beyond.

=== Einstein ===
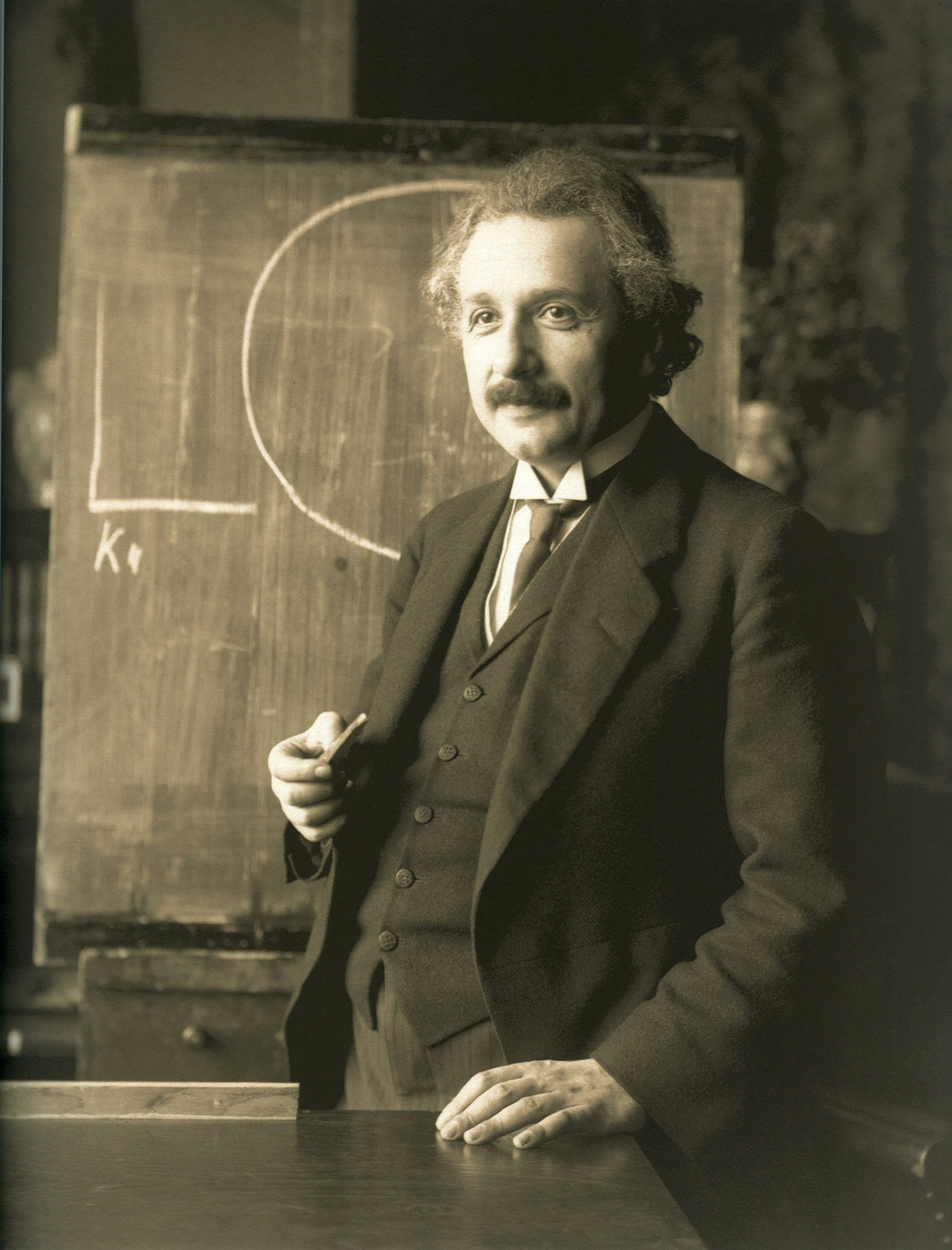
Albert Einstein in 1921

Einstein's theory of relativity and his contributions to quantum theory had made him famous in the scientific community, and by 1919 he even became a public celebrity after the solar eclipse of May 29, 1919, which helped substantiate Einstein's theory of general relativity, with the New York Times proclaiming: "Revolution in Science/New Theory of the Universe/Newtonian Ideas Overthrown." The new doctrine was widely regarded as necessitating a total overhaul of current understandings of space and time. Einstein's fame had proliferated through his own efforts as well: he had published popular versions of both his treatises, and his Four Lectures on Relativity (delivered in 1921 at Princeton University) had intensified public interest even further. Einstein was invited to France by Paul Langevin, on behalf of the Collège de France, to help "to restore relations between German and French scholars" after World War I, a conflict whose mechanization had enlisted scientists in the service of bloodshed to a previously unprecedented degree. Einstein had opposed the war. On his arrival at the Gare du Nord, Einstein was greeted by crowds of "photographers, reporters, filmmakers, officials and diplomats," and had to slip out a side door to escape the attention. The debate involved some reputational risk for Einstein. He was expecting to win the Nobel Prize that year, and had already promised the prize money as alimony to his ex-wife. Furthermore, his rhetorical skills would be handicapped due to his lack of fluency in French. The debate was not intended as a solo confrontation between Einstein and Bergson; Einstein was to field questions from the whole College, of which Bergson was only a single member.

Einstein's theory proposed that the speed of light in a vacuum is both constant and unsurpassable, regardless of the viewer's movement or location, necessitating that time passes at different rates for different reference frames, based on their velocity. Two clocks moving at two different speeds might therefore show two different times, and yet be equally correct. This was a rejection of the Newtonian absolutism that had previously characterized the attitude of physicists toward time. However, this does not preclude Einstein from believing that time has "an objective meaning [...] independent of individuals," and is quantifiable and predictable. Einstein's theory meant that time and space were no longer universal, and it disposed of the aether that was believed at the time to fill empty space. Einstein initially was an empiricist/positivist in line with Ernst Mach who took the input of the senses at face value, although starting in the early 1920s he distanced himself from positivism and began to embrace philosophical realism. Einstein had a longstanding distaste for Bergson's ideas. In 1914, he described Bergson's philosophy as "flaccid", and remarked that Bergson's work was not even worth reading to improve his French. After the debate, though acknowledging that Bergson had understood the substance of relativity theory, he reaffirmed his belief that "[t]he philosophers constantly dance around the dichotomy: the psychologically real and physically real, and differ only in evaluations in this regard."

== Remarks of April 6 ==
External media
- Minutes of the meeting (in French)

Xavier Léon, who had organized the event, introduced Einstein; Langevin spoke next, outlining Einstein's contribution to physics for those present. Einstein then fielded questions from several philosophers, including Léon Brunschvicg, whose question about relativity and Kant's conception of science Einstein shrugged off. Finally, Édouard Le Roy, a student of Bergson's, moved for Bergson to weigh in. Bergson was initially reluctant, saying that he "had come here to listen." For the most part, he praised Einstein's theory, saying that it could be admitted within the domain of physics, but argued that philosophy still had important contributions to make in the understanding of time, and that "all does not end" with relativity. He spoke for thirty minutes, quoting certain passages from his forthcoming book "Duration and Simultaneity"; Einstein took only a minute to respond. The response rested on distinguishing physical from psychological time as a pair of binary options, making no room for a philosophical understanding of time: "The time of the philosophers does not exist" (French: Il n'y a donc pas un temps des philosophes).

== The debate continues ==
=== Einstein's Nobel Prize ===
When Einstein was awarded the Nobel Prize in Physics for 1921, it was not for relativity, but for "his discovery of the law of the photoelectric effect." The presenter of the prize, Professor Svante Arrhenius, mentioned Bergson by name, saying that "though most discussion centers on [Einstein's] theory of relativity," Bergson had shown that relativity "pertains essentially to epistemology", rather than to physics, from which some concluded that Bergson's arguments were the reason that Einstein could not be awarded the Nobel Prize in that subject. Ironically, when Bergson was awarded the Nobel Prize in Literature in 1927, the presentation speech focused on his accomplishments as "stylist and poet", rather than on his contributions to philosophy. However, others have argued that Bergson's arguments played no essential role in denying Einstein the Nobel prize for relativity, and that the real reason lay in the "German ultranationalist experimental physicists' politically and racially motivated opposition to Einstein and his theories of relativity and gravitation".

=== Duration and Simultaneity ===
Later in 1922, Bergson published Duration and Simultaneity, which was explicitly a "confrontation" with Einstein's theory of relativity. It sought to enlist the facts Einstein drew upon in his theories in service of Bergson's vitalist philosophy. He argued that special relativity is rooted in quantifiable clock-time, and that it fails to capture the true essence of time as duration. Distinguishing between "real" time that can be directly experienced and "imaginary" time (i.e. time dilation and relativity of simultaneity) derived from the relativistic formulas, he specifically takes aim at the twin paradox first proposed by Paul Langevin, and calls for the biological aging process to be distinguished from measurable time. In Langevin's example, a traveler makes a round-trip in a rocket for 200 years as measured on Earth, while he himself only experienced 2 years during the flight (see History of the twin paradox). Bergson erroneously rejected this conclusion by claiming that both twins (Peter on Earth and Paul in the rocket) are interchangeable and therefore must be of same age at reunion:

p.74: We must now repeat for Paul everything we said about Peter: Since motion is reciprocal, the two people are interchangeable. If, earlier, looking into Peter's consciousness, we witnessed a certain flow. We are going to find exactly the same flow in Paul's consciousness. If we said that the first flow lasted two hundred years, the other flow will also last two hundred years. Peter and Paul, earth and projectile, will have gone through the same duration and aged equally. [Translation by Jacobson].

The book did not have the success that Bergson had hoped for, and did not dispel the popular consensus that Einstein had won the debate. The failure of Duration and Simultaneity has been understood as representing the end of Bergson's celebrity, though he remains an influential figure in twentieth-century philosophy today.

Partisans of relativity responded, with Jean Becquerel (son of Henri Becquerel), Miguel Masriera Rubio (professor of physical chemistry in Barcelona), and André Metz publishing articles and books in support of Einstein and against Bergson, and with the 1924 issue of the journal Revue de la philosophie featuring a back-and-forth debate between Bergson and Metz.

=== At the League of Nations ===
At the time of the debate, Bergson was president of the International Committee on Intellectual Cooperation (CIC), an academic advisory committee at the League of Nations, and Einstein was a member of this body. Time was a relevant subject for the CIC, as questions of time standardization were high on the list of priorities. However, Einstein and Bergson could not work together; Einstein resigned in 1922, publishing remarks against the CIC and the League of Nations as a whole, and privately naming Bergson's reception of relativity as a factor in his decision. The next year, he was reinstated due to fears that Germans would be underrepresented without him, and after Bergson's speech reintroducing him to the CIC, the debate was brought up again. Bergson and Einstein clashed several more times until Einstein's disparaging remarks about the whole enterprise of the CIC led to Bergson's resignation in 1925. This marked the end of Bergson's public career.

== Legacy ==
Prominent continental philosophers have defended Bergson's ideas against Einstein's. In 1952, upon being elected to the chair Bergson had occupied at the Collège de France, Maurice Merleau-Ponty, the founder of French phenomenology, discussed the debate that had taken place thirty years earlier. He proposed that the ascendancy of Einstein's theories had led to a "crisis of reason", and to a prevailing scientism in the face of which "[t]he experience of the perceived world with its obvious facts is no more than a stutter which precedes the clear speech of science." In 1955-1956, Merleau-Ponty delivered a series of lectures on Bergson's challenge to relativity, and in 1959 he delivered the concluding speech at the "Bergson Congress", which also included talks by thinkers such as Gabriel Marcel, Jean Wahl, and Vladimir Jankélévitch. Gilles Deleuze wrote that "Bergson's confrontation with Einstein was inevitable." According to Deleuze in his seminal Bergsonism, "[Duration and Simultaneity] led to so much misunderstanding because it was thought that Bergson was seeking to refute or correct Einstein, while in fact he wanted, by means of the new feature of duration, to give the theory of Relativity the metaphysics it lacked." Deleuze draws on Bergson's duration for his "Three Syntheses of Time" outlined in Difference and Repetition.

Alan Sokal, meanwhile, sees the persistence of vanquished Bergsonism after the Einstein debate as the "historical origin" of the "science wars", and characterizes contemporary thinkers still influenced by Bergson as irrationalist and atavistic. Gaston Bachelard believed Einstein's victory was definitive. Karl Popper shared this view.

On April 4–6, 2019, the University of L'Aquila, in collaboration with the Gran Sasso Science Institute, held an international conference called "What is time? Einstein-Bergson 100 years later."

== Scholarship ==
Jimena Canales' The Physicist and the Philosopher: Einstein, Bergson, and the Debate That Changed Our Understanding of Time covers the debate, its significance in the careers of both participants, and its enduring legacy.

In 2021, Einstein vs. Bergson: An Enduring Quarrel on Time, edited by Alessandro Campo and Simone Gozzano, was published by De Gruyter. It is an anthology compiling papers presented at the L'Aquila conference.

See also the 2021 papers by Steven Savitt, What Bergson Should Have Said to Einstein and by Peter Kügler, What Bergson should have said about special relativity.
