= Édouard Le Roy =

French philosopher and mathematician

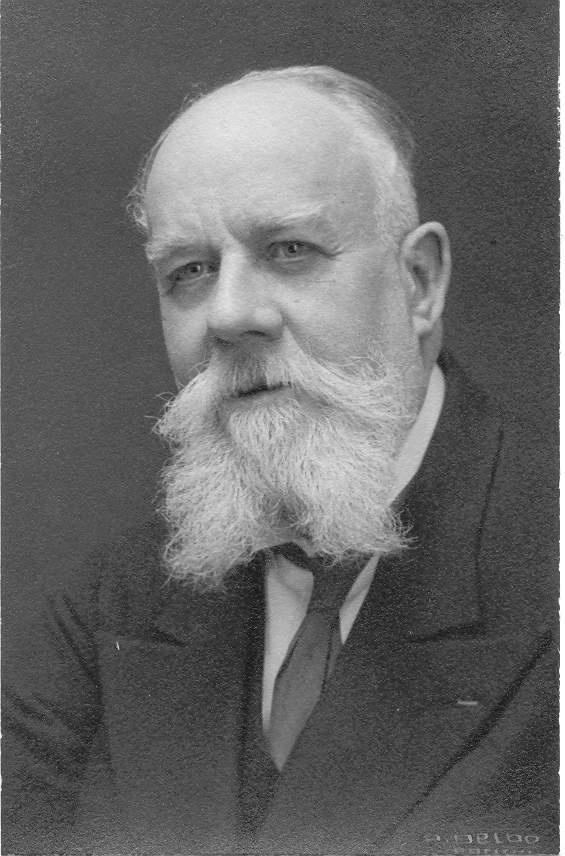
Édouard Le Roy

Édouard Louis Emmanuel Julien Le Roy (French: [edwaʁ ləʁwa]; 18 June 1870, Paris – 10 November 1954, Paris) was a French philosopher and mathematician.

== Life ==
Le Roy entered the École Normale Supérieure in 1892, and received the agrégation in mathematics in 1895. He became Doctor in Sciences in 1898, taught in several high schools, and in 1909 became professor of mathematics at the Lycée Saint-Louis in Paris.

From then on, Le Roy took a major interest in philosophy and metaphysics. A friend of Teilhard de Chardin and Henri Bergson's closer disciple, he succeeded Bergson at the College of France (1922) and, in 1945, at the Académie française. In 1919, Le Roy was also elected a member of the Académie des Sciences morales et politiques.

Le Roy was especially interested in the relations between science and morality. Along with Henri Poincaré and Pierre Duhem, he supported a conventionalist thesis on the foundation of mathematics. Although a fervent Catholic, he extended this conventionalist theory to revealed truths, which did not, according to him, withdraw any of their strength. In the domain of religious dogmas, he rejected abstract reasoning and speculative theology in favour of instinctive faith, heart and sentiment. He was one of those close to Bergson who encouraged him to turn to the study of mysticism, explored in his later works. His conventionalism led his works, accused of modernism, to be placed on the Index by the Holy See.

Le Roy was married and had one child.

== Works ==
- Théorie du potentiel newtonien : leçons professées à la Sorbonne pendant le premier semestre (1894-1895) (1896)
- Sur l'intégration des équations de chaleur (1898)
- Sur les séries divergentes et les fonctions définies par un développement de Taylor (1899)
- Science et Philosophie (1899)
- Dogme et Critique (1907)
- A New Philosophy: Henri Bergson (Une philosophie nouvelle : Henri Bergson, 1912)
- What Is a Dogma? (1918)
- Qu'est-ce-que la Science ?: réponse à André Metz (1926)
- L'Exigence idéaliste et le fait de l'évolution (1927)
- Les Origines humaines et l'évolution de l'intelligence (1928)
- La Pensée Intuitive. Le problème de Dieu (1929)
- Introduction à l'étude du problème religieux (1944)
- Discours de réception (1946)
- Essai d'une philosophie première (1956)
- Bergson et Bergsonisme (1947)
- Essai d'une philosophie première : l'exigence idéaliste et l'exigence morale, 2 vol., posthumous (1956-1958)

== See also ==
- Noosphere
- Pragmatism
