= Wiechert (crater) =

Lunar impact crater

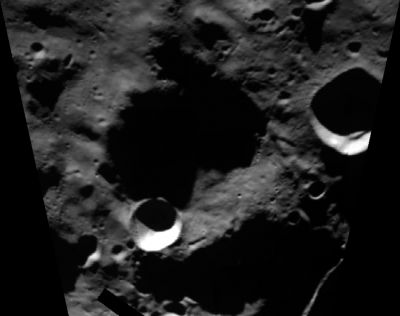
- Coordinates: 84.5°S 165.0°E
- Diameter: 41 km
- Depth: Unknown
- Colongitude: 190° at sunrise
- Eponym: Emil Wiechert

Wiechert is a degraded lunar impact crater that is located in the southern region of the Moon's far side. It lies to the southeast of the huge walled plain Schrödinger, less than 170 km from the southern pole.

This is a worn and eroded crater formation illuminated only by oblique sunlight. As a result, portions of the interior floor lie in deep darkness. The rim is irregular and has an outward break along the northern edge. A small, cup-shaped crater lies along the inner wall of the south-southwestern edge. The crater was studied by the Chandrayaan-2 mission using DF-SAR in 2025.

== Satellite craters ==
By convention these features are identified on lunar maps by placing the letter on the side of the crater midpoint that is closest to Wiechert.

Wiechert	Latitude	Longitude	Diameter
A	82.5° S	167.1° E	26 km
E	83.8° S	175.8° E	18 km
J	85.6° S	177.0° W	34 km
P	85.5° S	150.5° E	37 km
U	83.8° S	147.5° E	30 km
