= Fritz Müller-Partenkirchen =

German writer (1875–1942)

Fritz Müller-Partenkirchen (born Friedrich Müller; 24 February 1875 in Munich; 4 February 1942 in Hundham) was a German writer.

From 1892 to 1895, he studied merchant trade and became an accountant, later a teacher of commerce in Partenkirchen. Around the age of 38, he studied law and economics at the University of Zurich.

He attended a lecture by Albert Einstein in 1911 on the theory of relativity, of which he gave a popular report in the newspaper Berliner Tageblatt in 1911. (Note: Müller, F. (October 1911), "Das Zeitproblem", Berliner Tageblatt: Part 1 published 16 October 1911 and Part 2 published 23 October 1911; A partial English translation of some sections from Müller's paper can be found on pp. 300ff. in Gilbert, L. (1914). A satire on the principle of relativity. The Monist, 288-309.; See also Das Zeitproblem on German Wikisource) Müller's report on relativity was described by Könneker (2001).

In 1915, the first edition of his World War I stories and experiences was published. In the 1920s, he adopted the artistic name Müller-Partenkirchen and wrote, often in a humorous style, merchant stories and novels. His most successful novel was Kramer & Friemann. Eine Lehrzeit published in 1920. In an accident, Müller-Partenkirchen lost one leg, and the other one was paralyzed.

After the Nazi regime took power, he signed the vow of most faithful allegiance to Adolf Hitler in October 1933 along with 87 other writers. After the war, two of his stories published between 1934 and 1942 were placed on the "list of literature to be expelled" in the Soviet occupation zone in Germany.

== See also ==
- History of the twin paradox

== Publications (selection) ==
- Das Land ohne Rücken. Erlebnisse und Geschichten aus dem Weltkrieg. Heilbronn 1915
- Zweimal ein Bub. Geschichten. 1918
- Kramer & Friemann. Eine Lehrzeit. Bertelsmann, Gütersloh 1920
- Dreizehn Aktien. Hanseatische, Hamburg 1921
- Die Hochzeit von Oberammergau. Bertelsmann, Gütersloh 1922
- München. Geschichten. 1925
- Die Kopierpresse. Staackmann, Leipzig 1926
- Jetzt grad extra – Trotzalledem-Geschichten. Staackmann, Leipzig 1927
- Kaum genügend. Schulgeschichten. Staackmann, Leipzig 1927
- Schön ist’s auf der Welt – Fröhliche Geschichten. Staackmann, Leipzig 1927
- Debitorenkonto Folio 1347 und andere Geschichten. Ein Lesebuch für den jungen Kaufmann. 1928
- Der Dreizehnte. S. Amthorsche, Leipzig 1930
- Kinder. Geschichten. Leipzig 1932
