= The Principles of Quantum Mechanics =

Textbook by Paul Dirac

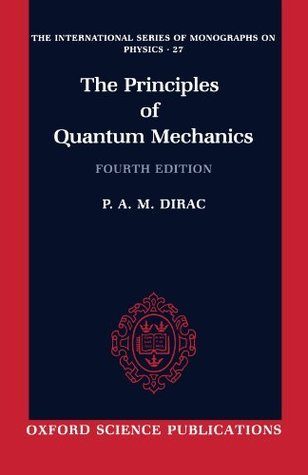
- Cover of the revised 4th edition
- Author: Paul Dirac
- Language: English
- Subject: Quantum mechanics
- Publisher: Oxford University Press
- Publication date: 1930 (1st ed.); 1935 (2nd ed.); 1947 (3rd ed.); 1958 (4th ed.); 1967 (4th ed., revised)
- Publication place: United Kingdom
- Media type: Print
- Pages: 357 (1st ed.); 314 (4th ed.)

The Principles of Quantum Mechanics is an influential monograph written by Paul Dirac and first published by Oxford University Press in 1930. In this book, Dirac presents quantum mechanics in a formal, logically consistent, and axiomatic fashion, making the book the first of its kind. It is based on matrices and operators rather than wave–particle duality. In the first edition, there are 82 sections and 785 equations but no diagrams. It also does not have an index, a bibliography, or a list of suggestions for further reading. The first half of the book lays down the foundations of quantum mechanics while the second half focuses on its applications. Dirac did not pursue a historical approach to the subject, nor did he discuss at length the philosophy of quantum mechanics.

== History ==
Paul Dirac played a key role in the development of quantum mechanics at the University of Cambridge and the University of Göttingen during the mid- to late-1920s. In September 1925, Dirac, then a post-graduate student, received the proofs of a seminal paper forwarded to him by his supervisor, Ralph Fowler, from its author, Werner Heisenberg. Dirac soon recognized the fundamental importance of the non-commutativity of the quantities he encountered. He realized that there was a connection between Heisenberg's matrices and Poisson brackets from classical mechanics, which he could exploit to create his own version of quantum mechanics.

Dirac was one of a handful of physicists at Cambridge who were at the cutting edge of the new quantum theory, and, unusually for an early-career researcher, he agreed to write a new textbook on the subject to be published as part of the International Series of Monographs on Physics, edited by Fowler and Peter Kapitza. The first edition of The Principles of Quantum Mechanics appeared in 1930. The Principles was similar in style to the lectures Dirac had been delivering at Cambridge while he was a doctoral candidate during the late 1920s, but not in the contents, which were restricted to what was known at the time. After the completion of the book, Dirac used it for his courses on quantum mechanics over the next four decades, including one he taught at Cambridge during the 1930s in the Lent (spring) terms. (Alan Wilson taught in the Michaelmas (autumn) terms, where he focused on the applications of Schrödinger's equation.)

Whereas Erwin Schrödinger and Carl Eckart had only demonstrated the equivalence of the wave and matrix formulations of quantum mechanics, Dirac went much further, creating his own version that encompassed both of the above. He called it the theory of linear transformations. In addition, he took inspiration from a paper published by Cornelius Lanczos presenting quantum mechanics in terms of the theory of linear integral equations. Commenting in this work in a 1963 interview, Dirac stated, "A great deal of my work was just playing with equations and see what they give." In his construction of transformation theory, Dirac popularized the $\delta$-function, a generalized function or distribution now named after him, though it had previously been used in the nineteenth century by multiple scholars, such as Gustav Kirchhoff in a paper on the Huygens principle in optics and by Oliver Heaviside in his work on electromagnetism. Dirac biographer Graham Farmelo surmised that Heaviside was likely a direct influence on Dirac. In a 1963 interview, Dirac stated, "All electrical engineers are familiar with the idea of a pulse, and the $\delta$-function is just a way of expressing a pulse mathematically."

The Principles was atypical for its time in many different ways. It did not contain any references to the research literature. Chapter One is a purely qualitative exposition on the principle of superposition, illustrated by the polarization of light. The Planck constant $h$ was only mentioned later in the book, in a discussion on the general commutation relations, where Dirac introduced the reduced Planck constant $\hslash$ ("$h$ bar" or "Dirac's $h$") as a shorthand for $h/2\pi$. Likewise, the Schrödinger equation was presented late in the book. For Dirac, quantum mechanics was no more than a mathematical framework from which one could calculate quantities that could be compared with experiment. Questions of deeper meaning were, according to him, meaningless. Although Dirac never discussed the philosophy of quantum mechanics, his views were, in effect, close to the Copenhagen interpretation. (Also see positivism.)

In the second edition (1935), Dirac aimed to make the book more accessible than the first, and rewrote most of it. Unlike the first edition, where he defined the "state" of a quantum-mechanical system as its condition in four-dimensional spacetime, in this edition, he only described the "state" of a system only for a given moment in time. Being aware of the difficulties of making quantum mechanics fully consistent with special relativity in order to create a coherent quantum theory of electrodynamics, he resorted to using three-dimensional space in the sense of classical physics. He included a new discussion on the action principle, though with a footnote saying that students uninterested in analytical mechanics could skip it, and acknowledged the discovery of the positron, predicted by the negative-energy solution to his relativistic wave equation for the electron. In the first edition, Dirac, as he did in the 1928 paper, stated—erroneously—the negative-energy solution was the proton. Interpreting negative-energy solutions was a matter of controversy. But Hermann Weyl, J. Robert Oppenheimer, and Wolfgang Pauli showed that a "hole" in the "sea" of negative energy had the same mass as an electron. By 1931, Dirac was convinced that his equation predicted the existence of antimatter. The positron—short for "positive electron"—was discovered the following year by Carl Anderson.

In 1947 the third edition of the book was published, in which the chapter on quantum electrodynamics was rewritten particularly with the inclusion of electron-positron creation. Beginning with this edition, the mathematical descriptions of quantum states and operators were changed to use the bra–ket notation, introduced in 1939 by Dirac himself. It was later reprinted multiple times.

The fourth edition was published in 1958, with the chapter on quantum electrodynamics completely rewritten, a reflection of the rapid pace of development of quantum electrodynamics, both theoretical and experimental.. A revised fourth edition appeared in 1967. The revised version of the fourth edition changed §81 from "Difficulties of the theory" to "Interpretation" and added §82 "Applications" to the final chapter on quantum electrodynamics.

Although Dirac knew about group theory, he did not think it was useful for quantum mechanics, and did not include it. (Group theory was first applied to quantum mechanics by Eugene Wigner and John von Neumann and independently by Hermann Weyl in the late 1920s.)

== Translations ==
It has been translated to multiple languages, including Russian, Japanese, German, and French. Dirac supplied an additional preface for the Russian edition, thanks to his good relationship with Russian physicists Igor Tamm and Peter Kapitza. At the request of Dmitri Ivanenko, Dirac added a chapter on methods of approximations, including the Hartree–Fock method (developed by Douglas Hartree and Vladimir Fock) for the Russian edition. In the Russian edition, Ivanenko added multiple appendices and Matvei Bronstein some footnotes. He also supplied a preface to the Japanese edition as requested by the translators, two of whom were Yoshio Nishina and Sin-Itiro Tomonaga. Being fluent in German, Dirac personally checked the German translation by Werner Bloch.

== Contents ==
=== First edition ===
The chapter titles of the first edition are

1. The principle of superposition
2. Symbolic algebra of states and observables
3. Eigenvalues and eigenstates
4. Representation of states and observables
5. Transformation theory
6. Equations of motion and quantum conditions
7. Elementary applications
8. Motion in a central field of force
9. Perturbation theory
10. Collision problems
11. Systems containing several similar particles
12. Theory of radiation
13. Relativity theory of the electron

=== Fourth edition ===
The chapter titles of the fourth edition are

1. The principle of superposition
2. Dynamical variables and observables
3. Representations
4. The quantum conditions
5. The equations of motion
6. Elementary applications
7. Perturbation theory
8. Collision problems
9. Systems containing several similar particles
10. Theory of radiation
11. Relativistic theory of the electron
12. Quantum electrodynamics

== Reception and legacy ==
According to Laurie M. Brown, it "set the stage, the tone, and much of the language of the quantum-mechanical revolution."

The book quickly rose to prominence, surpassing other texts published in the 1930s. German and Russian translations were even more popular. In what was then the Soviet Union, it sold 3,000 copies in just a few months. However, the publishing house, GTTI, felt the need to assert that despite appearances to the contrary, Dirac's personal view of quantum mechanics, which was close to what would later be named the Copenhagen interpretation, was not at odds with the ideology of dialectical materialism. Felix Bloch praised the book for its originality and self-contained presentation, but worried that Dirac did not refer much to the original research literature. Matvei Bronstein opined that Dirac's textbook was superior to Gruppentheorie und Quantenmechanik (1928) by Hermann Weyl, which, according to him, was overly formal. Wolfgang Pauli praised it as "an indispensable standard work" but was concerned that it was too distant from experiments. He also had a high opinion of the German translation, describing it and the original book as "highly reliable" and "essential" for physicists studying quantum theory. J. Robert Oppenheimer called the book an "astonishingly complete" and "coherent" treatise, comparing it to Elementary Principles in Statistical Mechanics (1902) by Josiah Willard Gibbs, but warned that like Gibbs' book, it was not suitable as an introduction to quantum mechanics. Similarly, John Lennard-Jones recommended the book for everyone who wished to stay abreast with modern physics, but cautioned that it was not easy to read. Charles Galton Darwin complained about the lack of concrete examples to illustrate the theory. Paul Epstein and Werner Heisenberg complimented the second edition for being more comprehensible than the first. Albert Einstein admired the book as "the most logically perfect presentation" of the subject and made it his companion. Freeman Dyson compared it to a fine work of art. Indeed, while textbooks are seldom cited in research papers, Dirac's Principles proved to be an exception during the 1930s.

However, while physicists had a high opinion of the book, mathematicians were more critical. Bernard Koopman praised Dirac for his profound physical insight but disliked what he perceived as its lack of logical clarity. Koopman also took issue with Dirac's use of the hybrid terms eigenvalue and eigenfunction—from the German Eigenwert and Eigenfunktion—instead of characteristic value and characteristic function. Garrett Birkhoff and John von Neumann complained about the way Dirac employed mathematics, including the $\delta$-distribution. Indeed, Dirac himself admitted that it was not a function in the standard sense of the term, but justified his position by arguing that his use of it nevertheless led to correct results. On the other hand, the $\delta$-distribution was a motivation for Laurent Schwartz in his work to put the notion of distributions or generalized functions on a secure mathematical footing in 1945. Schwartz credited Dirac with thinking of the $\delta$-function as the kernel of an integral transform. Dirac's distribution remains in use. Max Jammer observed that Dirac's primary motivation in writing the book was creating an exposition in physics, treating mathematics as a tool. In this regard, von Neumann's Mathematical Foundations of Quantum Mechanics (1932), with its uncompromising emphasis on mathematical rigour, was a supplement to Dirac's book.

Among students, opinions were mixed. Some were displeased that the book was basically a transcript of Dirac's lectures at Cambridge. Most students looked elsewhere because they wanted a text that could teach them how to carry out computations. But the most gifted of them viewed the book as a "bible" of modern physics. One such student was Subrahmanyan Chandrasekhar, who later became an astrophysicist. Abdus Salam and Eugene Wigner compared Dirac's The Principles of Quantum Mechanics with the Principia, written by Dirac's predecessor as the Lucasian Professor of Mathematics at Cambridge, Isaac Newton. For young American physicists of the 1930s, Dirac's text was one of their first introductions to the nascent scientific theory. In his doctoral dissertation, Richard Feynman cited Dirac's discussion of the action principle in the second edition. Still in print in the early twenty-first century, it has influenced many generations of young physicists. John Gribbin recommended that students at least borrow a library copy to read the first chapter. However, Dirac biographer Graham Farmelo recalled his colleagues' complaints that the book was not useful for learning physics developed after 1940 due to Dirac's refusal to accept renormalization—which he described as something that merely "swept infinities under the carpet"—even though it had become a standard tool in quantum field theory.

== See also ==
- The Evolution of Physics (Einstein and Infeld)
- The Feynman Lectures on Physics Vol. III (Feynman)
- The Physical Principles of the Quantum Theory (Heisenberg)
- Mathematical Foundations of Quantum Mechanics (von Neumann)
- Modern Quantum Mechanics (Sakurai)
