= Emil Wiechert =

German physicist (1861–1928)

Emil Johann Wiechert
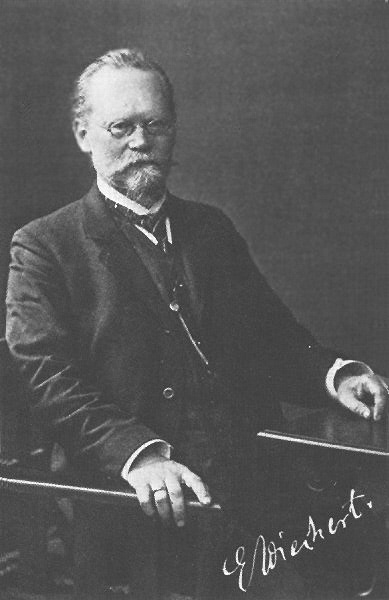
- Emil Johann Wiechert
- Born: 26 December 1861; Tilsit, Province of Prussia, Kingdom of Prussia
- Died: 19 March 1928 (aged 66); Göttingen, Germany
- Citizenship: German
- Education: University of Königsberg, University of Göttingen
- Known for: Liénard–Wiechert potential Maxwell–Wiechert model Wiechert–Gutenberg discontinuity Wiechert–Herglotz method Independent discovery of electron
- Awards: Berlin Academy of Science
- Scientific career
- Fields: Physics, Geophysics
- Workplaces: Germany
- Notable students: Karl Bernhard Zoeppritz, Beno Gutenberg

Emil Johann Wiechert (26 December 1861 – 19 March 1928) was a German physicist and geophysicist who made many contributions to both fields, including presenting the first verifiable model of a layered structure of the Earth and being among the first to discover the electron. He went on to become the world's first Professor of Geophysics at the University of Göttingen.

== Early years ==
Wiechert was born in Tilsit, Province of Prussia, the son of Johann and Emilie Wiechert. After his father died, his mother, Emilie, moved to Königsberg so that Emil could study at the University of Königsberg. Owing to financial difficulties, he took longer than normal to complete his education and was finally awarded a Ph.D. on 1 February 1889. In October 1890 he received his Habilitation in Physics and by 1896, he had achieved the title of Professor. In 1898, he was appointed to the world's first Chair of Geophysics at the University of Göttingen.

== Career ==
Whilst at Königsberg, Wiechert was investigating the nature of X-rays and became one of the first to discover that cathode rays are made up of particle streams. He correctly measured the mass-to-charge ratio of these particles but failed to take the final step and explain that these particles were a new type of elementary particle - the electron. Wiechert was also interested in fields outside of fundamental physics and in 1896, he published the first verifiable model of the Earth's interior as a series of shells. Here he concluded that the difference between the density of the Earth's surface rocks and the mean density of the Earth meant that the Earth must have a heavy iron core. These were the foundations that one of Wiechert's students, Beno Gutenberg, used to discover the three-layered Earth in 1914.

As part of Felix Klein's efforts to re-establish the University of Göttingen as a world leading research centre, Wiechert's tutor, Woldemar Voigt, was lured away from Königsberg and took Wiechert with him. He had initially hoped to become a Professor of theoretical physics but was eventually invited by Klein to found the world's first Institute of Geophysics, becoming the world's first Professor of Geophysics in 1898. He would remain there for the rest of his career, mentoring many students who became world-leading geophysicists and seismologists, including Karl Bernhard Zoeppritz and Beno Gutenberg.

== Contributions and influence ==
During his career he made many other important contributions, writing a number of scientific papers, including a pioneering work on how seismic waves propagate through the Earth. He also devised an improved seismograph and created the field of geological prospecting using small, artificially-created earthquakes. Wiechert was also interested in theoretical physics, such as the theory of relativity by Albert Einstein, discussing the role of the luminiferous aether and related questions with Hendrik Antoon Lorentz and others, and contributed to the development of the twin paradox.

He married Helene Ziebarth, a lawyer's daughter, in 1908, but the couple did not have children.

== Awards and honors ==
- Corresponding member of the Berlin Academy of Science, 1912.
- The crater Wiechert on the Moon is named after him.

== See also ==
- History of the twin paradox
- List of geophysicists
