= Jimena Canales =

Mexican-American historian of science

- Born: Jimena Canales; 20 October 1973 (age 52); Mexico City, Mexico
- Occupation: Writer
- Writing career
- Notable works: A Tenth of a Second: A History and The Physicist and The Philosopher: Einstein, Bergson, and the Debate that Changed Our Understanding of Time
- Website: www.jimenacanales.org

Jimena Canales (born 1973) is a Mexican-American historian of science and author with a background in physics and engineering.

== Career ==
Jimena Canales is the author of Simply Einstein (2021), Bedeviled: A Shadow History of Demons in Science (2020), The Physicist and the Philosopher: Einstein, Bergson and the Debate that Changed Our Understanding of Time (2015) and A Tenth of a Second: A History (2009) as well as numerous articles on the history of modernity; specializing in art, science and technology (appearing in Artforum, Aperture, WIRED, The New Yorker, The Atlantic, NPR, among others). Canales obtained a B.S. in engineering physics at the Instituto Tecnológico de Estudios Superiores de Monterrey in 1995, a master's degree in History of Science at the Harvard University and a PhD in History of Science at the same university in 2003. In 2004 she worked as an assistant professor in the Department of History of Science at Harvard University and in 2013 she was promoted to associate professor. In 2012 she was senior fellow at the Internationales Kolleg für Kulturtechnikforschung und Medienphilosophie and in the summer she worked as a visiting professor at the Summer School for Media Studies at Princeton University in the German department. In 2013 she was recruited to the University of Illinois at Urbana-Champaign as the Thomas M. Siebel Chair in the History of Science, which she held until 2017.

Jimena Canales has collaborated with the philosopher Bruno Latour, the artist Olafur Eliasson and the cosmologist Lee Smolin.

Her presentations on art and science has been featured at the Centre Georges Pompidou, San Francisco Museum of Modern Art (SFMOMA), the 11th Shanghai Biennale and the Institute of Contemporary Art, Boston (ICA).

== Awards and reviews ==
- Premio Cosmos, per la divulgazione scientifica for L'Ombra del diavolo
- The New Yorker reviews
- The Washington Post reviews
- The Guardian's Top 10 Books About Time
- Books of the Year 2016
- 25 Top Ibero-American Intellectuals
- Best Science Books for 2015
- Independent's Top Reads of 2015
- Science Friday's Best Science Books of 2015
- Charles A. Ryskamp Award from the American Council of Learned Societies
- University of Chicago Press Bevington Prize (2008)
- Prize for Young Scholars (2005), awarded by the International Union of History and Philosophy of Science, History of Science

== Books and selected articles ==
books

- (2009) A Tenth of a Second: A History, University of Chicago Press, ISBN 9780226093185
- (2016) The Physicist and the Philosopher: Einstein, Bergson and the Debate that Changed Our Understanding of Time, Princeton University Press ISBN 9780691173177
- (2020) Bedeviled: A Shadow History of Demons in Science, Princeton University Press, ISBN 978-0691175324
- (2021) Simply Einstein, Simply Charly publ. ISBN 9781943657452

articles

- The Secret PR Push That Shaped the Atomic Bomb's Origin Story, The Atlantic
- Albert Einstein’s Sci-Fi Stories, The New Yorker
- An Ode To Insignificance: Buttons, Touchscreens, And Other Dangerous Technologies, NPR
- Siri, Cortana, And Alexa Carry The Marks Of Their Human Makers, NPR
- This Philosopher Helped Ensure There Was No Nobel for Relativity, Nautilus

== See also ==
- Einstein–Bergson debate
