= André Metz =

André Metz (4 November 1891 in Santo Domingo – 16 December 1968 in Louveciennes) was a French officer and popularizer of physics.

== Life and work ==
He attended the École Polytechnique (1910), became an Engineer officer and directed the Revue du génie militaire from 1933 to 1937. He was in the French Liberation Army during World War II, became brigadier general in 1946 and was awarded the order of Commandeur de la Légion d’Honneur. He was a member of the Société Française de Physique and Société française de Philosophie, and was awarded the Prix Binoux (1928), the Prix Ch. Lambert (1963), and the Prix Henri Becquerel (1967).

He became known for his defense of Albert Einstein's theory of relativity against criticisms and inaccurate popularizations in French literature, in particular the ones given by the philosopher Henri Bergson. Metz's efforts were appreciated by Einstein in a letter exchange with Metz (see Hentschel and Canales for details). He was also a proponent of the philosophy of Émile Meyerson.

== Publications (selection) ==
- La Relativité (Paris 1923 — augmented edition 1926)
- Les Nouvelles Théories scientifiques et leurs adversaires, Chiron, 1926.
- Meyerson (Alcan, Paris 1926 – augmented edition 1934)
- Bergson (Paris 1933)
- Science et réalité (Sedes, Paris 1964)
