= Paul Gruner =

Swiss physicist (1869–1957)

Franz Rudolf Paul Gruner (13 January 1869 in Bern – 11 December 1957) was a Swiss physicist.

== Life ==
He attended the gymnasium in Morges, the Free Gymnasium Bern, and passed the matura at another gymnasium in Bern. He studied at the universities of Bern, Strasbourg, and Zurich. The doctorate was awarded to him in 1893 under Heinrich Friedrich Weber in Zurich. From 1893 to 1903 he taught physics and mathematics at the Free Gymnasium Bern. In 1894 he was habilitated in physics and became Privatdozent, and in 1904 titular professor in Bern. From 1906 to 1913 he was professor extraordinarius, and eventually from 1913 to 1939 professor ordinarius for theoretical physics (the first one in Switzerland). From 1921 to 1922 he was rector of this university.

In 1892 he became a member of the Society for Natural Sciences of Bern, in 1898 its secretary, from 1904 to 1906 and 1912 to 1914 its vice president and president, and starting in 1939 he held an honorary membership. He was a member of the Swiss Academy of Natural Sciences, being its vice president from 1917 to 1922, and a member of the Swiss Physical Society, being its vice president from 1916 to 1918 and president from 1919 to 1920. He took part in the development of the physics journal Helvetica Physica Acta, was president of the Swiss Meteorological Commission, and due to his Christian faith and rejection of materialism he became a member of the Keplerbund (an association of Christian natural scientists).

== Scientific work ==
He published scientific and popular-scientific papers on several topics. Best known was his work on optical depth and twilight phenomena, but he published also in the fields of the theory of relativity and its graphical representation using special Minkowski diagrams, radioactivity, kinetic theory of gases, electron theory, quantum theory, thermodynamics.

== Gruner and Einstein ==
In 1903, Albert Einstein became a member the Society for Natural Sciences of Bern with the help of one of his colleagues from the patent office in Bern, Josef Sauter. There, Einstein met Sauter's friend Paul Gruner, then Privatdozent for theoretical physics. Einstein held lectures and discussions in Gruner's home and started a letter exchange with him. When Einstein tried to become Privatdozent himself in 1907, Gruner (now professor for theoretical physics in Bern) supported him. Eventually, in 1908 Einstein became Privatdozent in Bern.

Gruner and Sauter were among the participants in the relativity conference held on 11–16 July 1955 in Bern in celebration of the 50th anniversary of Einstein's 1905 achievement.

== Minkowski diagram ==
Gruner (1921) used symmetric Minkowski diagrams, in which the x'- and ct-axes are mutually perpendicular, as well as the x-axis and the ct'-axis

In May 1921, Gruner (in collaboration with Sauter) developed symmetric Minkowski diagrams in two papers, first using the relation $\sin\varphi=v/c$ and in the second one $\cos\theta=v/c$. (Note: Gruner, Paul & Sauter, Josef (1921). "Représentation géométrique élémentaire des formules de la théorie de la relativité". Archives des sciences physiques et naturelles. 5. 3: 295–296. (Translation: Elementary geometric representation of the formulas of the special theory of relativity)) (Note: Gruner, Paul (1921). "Eine elementare geometrische Darstellung der Transformationsformeln der speziellen Relativitätstheorie". Physikalische Zeitschrift. 22: 384–385. (Translation: An elementary geometrical representation of the transformation formulas of the special theory of relativity)) In subsequent papers in 1922 and 1924 this method was further extended to representations in two- and three-dimensional space. (Note: Gruner, Paul (1921). "a) Représentation graphique de l'univers espace-temps à quatre dimensions. b) Représentation graphique du temps universel dans la théorie de la relativité". Archives des sciences physiques et naturelles. 5. 4: 234–236. (Translation: Graphical representation of the four-dimensional space-time universe)) (See Minkowski diagram#Loedel diagram for mathematical details).

Gruner wrote in 1922 that the construction of those diagrams allows for the introduction of a third frame, whose time and space axes are orthogonal as in ordinary Minkowski diagrams. Consequently, it is possible that the coordinates of frames $S$ and $S'$ can be symmetrically projected onto the axes of this frame, making it to some kind of "universal frame" involving "universal coordinates" in respect to this system pair. Gruner noted that there is no contradiction to special relativity, since these coordinates are only valid with respect to one system pair only. He acknowledged that he wasn't the first to analyze such "universal coordinates", and alluded to two predecessors:

In 1918 Édouard Guillaume asserted to have found a "universal time" $t$ in the sense of the Galilei-Newtonian absolute time by analyzing two frames moving in opposite directions, and subsequently claimed to have refuted the principles of relativity. (For an overview on the discussions with the relativity critic Guillaume, see Genovesi (2000)).

Guillaume's error was pointed out by Dmitry Mirimanoff in March 1921, showing that Guillaume's variable $t$ in that specific example has a different meaning, and that no contradiction to relativity arises. Time $t$ is rather connected by a constant factor to time $\tau$ of what Mirimanoff called a "median frame". One always can find a third frame $S_0$ in which two relatively moving frames $S$ and $S'$ have equal speed in opposite directions. Since the derived coordinates are depending on the relative velocity of the system pair, and consequently are changing for different system pairs, it follows that Guillaume's universal time $t$ derived from $\tau$, has no "universal" physical meaning at all. (Note: Mirimanoff, Dmitry (1921). "La transformation de Lorentz-Einstein et le temps universel de M. Ed. Guillaume". Archives des sciences physiques et naturelles (Supplement). 5. 3: 46–48. (Translation:The Lorentz-Einstein transformation and the universal time of Ed. Guillaume)) Also Gruner came to the same conclusion as Mirimanoff, and gave him credit for the correct interpretation of the meaning of those "universal frames". While Gruner also gave Guillaume credit for finding certain mathematical relations, he criticized him in several papers for the misapplication of this result and the misguided criticism of relativity.

== Selected publications ==
- Gruner, Paul (1898). Astronomische Vorträge. Bern: Nydegger Baumgart.
- Gruner, Paul (1906). Die radioaktiven Substanzen und die Theorie des Atomzerfalls. Bern: A. Francke.
- Gruner, Paul (1908). Die Wandlung In Den Anschauungen Uber Das Wesen der Elktriaitat. Hamburg: Gustav Shlossmans Verlagsbuchhandlung.
- Gruner, Paul (1911). Kurzes Lehrbuch der Radioaktivität. Bern: A. Francke.
- Gruner, Paul (1921). Leitfaden der geometrischen Optik. Bern: P. Haupt.
- Gruner, Paul (1922). Elemente der Relativitätstheorie. Bern: P. Haupt.
- Gruner, Paul; Kleinert, Heinrich (1927). Dämmerungserscheinungen. Hamburg: H. Grand.
- Gruner, Paul (1942). Menschenwege und Gotteswege im Studentenleben. Persönliche Erinnerungen aus der christl. Studentenbewegung. Bern: BEG-Verlag.

== Bibliography ==
- Jost, W. (1958). "Prof. Dr. Paul Gruner : 1869-1957". Mitteilungen der Naturforschenden Gesellschaft in Bern. 16: 109–114.
- Mercier, André (1958). "Paul Gruner". Verhandlungen der Schweizerischen Naturforschenden Gesellschaft. 138: 363–364.
- Bebié, Hans (1966). "Gruner, Franz Rudolf Paul". Neue Deutsche Biographie (in German). Vol. 7. Berlin: Duncker & Humblot. pp. 230–230. (full text online).
- Fölsing, Albrecht (1995). Albert Einstein. Eine Biographie. Frankfurt am Main: Suhrkamp. ISBN 3518389904.
- Alessandra Hool; Gerd Graßhoff (2008). Die Gründung der Schweizerischen Physikalischen Gesellschaft: Festschrift zum hundertjährigen Bestehen. Bern Studies in the History and Philosophy of Science. ISBN 9783952288283.
