= Édouard Guillaume =

Swiss physicist

Édouard Guillaume (1881–1959) was a Swiss physicist and patent examiner, notorious for his published papers attacking Albert Einstein's theory of special relativity. He is also noteworthy for his work on mathematical economics.

Édouard Guillaume was the younger cousin of Charles Édouard Guillaume, who won the Nobel prize in physics in 1920. Both of the Guillaume cousins received doctorates in physics from the Zurich Polytechnique (ETH Zurich). Édouard Guillaume (the younger cousin) worked at the Swiss patent office where Einstein worked from 1902 to 1909. Beginning in 1913 Guillaume began publishing in the Archives des Sciences Physiques et Naturelles papers arguing for a Lorentzian electrodynamics with a universal time. He claimed that Einstein's theory mistakes changes in the units of measurement for physical changes and that time can be regarded as absolute. Guillaume opposed the theory of relativity, though most of his objections were related to special relativity.

Beginning in 1917, Einstein started to reply to some of the letters Guillaume sent to him. The correspondence went on for a number of years, but Einstein was unable to convince Guillaume.

In 1915 he moved from the Swiss patent office to the Swiss Federal Office for Insurance. From 1916 to 1946 when he retired, he worked for the Swiss insurance company La Neuchâteloise, of which he became a director. For the academic year 1936-1937 he lectured on financial economics as a privat docent at the University of Neuchâtel.

In the 1930s the Swiss brothers Édouard and Georges Guillaume launched an ambitious attempt to found a science of “rational economics” by analogy with the science of rational mechanics. Their models were intensively discussed by the X-Crise group in Paris, and exerted an influence on the early French contributions to mathematical economics and econometrics. In addition, the Guillaume brothers ... created their own research institute in Paris, which applied their models to real world issues and offered its services to the private sector. Later they became involved in attempts to conceive electrical machines which represented the working of the economic system.

Édouard Guillaume was an Invited Speaker of the ICM in 1920 in Strasbourg, where he presented his ideas concerning relativity theory. In 1932 he was an Invited Speaker of the ICM in 1932 in Zurich, where he gave a talk stemming from the Guillaume brothers' work on mathematical economics.

== Selected publications ==
- Guillaume, Édouard. "La théorie de la relativité et le temps universel." Revue de Métaphysique et de Morale 25, no. 3 (1918): 285-323.
- Guillaume, Édouard. "La théorie de la relativité et sa signification." Revue de Métaphysique et de Morale 27, no. 4 (1920): 423-469.
