= Werner Bloch =

German teacher and politician (1890–1973)

Werner Bloch (4 February 1890 in Berlin – 20 August 1973 in Bad Waldsee) was a German politician of the SPD.

== Life and work ==
Werner Bloch's father was the Berlin book dealer Ludwig Bloch (1859–1939); his younger brother was the later district mayor of Berlin-Steglitz Peter Bloch. Werner Bloch graduated from the University of Berlin in 1910 and studied philosophy, literature, and physics, first at Berlin and then at Munich. In 1913, he received his doctorate in philosophy. In 1914, Bloch returned to Berlin where he worked in the school service from 1915, and in 1928 at the Karl-Marx-Schule in Berlin-Neukölln.

In 1916/17 he attended lectures on physics by Albert Einstein, and in 1918 he published a popular introduction to the theory of relativity of which a second edition appeared in 1920. He also published other science books, as well as translations of English books into German.

Because of his Jewish ancestry he was dismissed from teaching after the Nazis came to power, but with the support of the Jewish community in Berlin he was able to become a teacher at Jewish schools, such as in Sweden. From 1937 to 1945 he worked as a physicist in a factory. After the Second World War, Bloch became the head of school education in the district of Wilmersdorf, from 1946 he became a teacher and later from 1950 also director of the Paulsen-Gymnasium in Berlin-Steglitz. Being a member of the SPD, in June 1951 he moved to the House of Deputies of Berlin. In 1955 obtained this position again, and stayed being a member until 1963. On the occasion of his 80th birthday, Bloch was honored in 1970 due to the services provided in his political functions in Berlin. Werner Bloch died in 1973 at the age of 83 in Bad Waldsee. His grave in Berlin-Westend is dedicated as an honorary grave of the State of Berlin.

== Publications and translations (selection) ==
- Der Pragmatismus von James und Schiller (1913, Dissertation)
- Einführung in die Relativitätstheorie (1. edition 1918, 2. edition 1920, 3. edition 1921)
- Abriss der Radiotechnik für den Schulgebrauch (1924)
- Radiotechnik: Wellentelephonie (1924)
- Vom Kienspan bis zum künstlichen Tageslicht (1925)
- ABC der Atome (1925, translation of Bertrand Russell's "The ABC of Atoms"
- Unser Planetensystem (1927)
- Die Prinzipien der Quantenmechanik (1930, translation of Paul Dirac's The Principles of Quantum Mechanics)
