= Friedrich Beck =

German physicist

- Beck as featured in the "Men Who Made a New Science" article published in the June 2008 Special Issue "Synaptic Quantum Tunnelling" of NeuroQuantology
- Born: Friedrich Hans Beck; 16 February 1927; Wiesbaden, Germany
- Died: 20 December 2008 (aged 81)
- Education: University of Göttingen (Ph.D.)
- Scientific career
- Fields: Theoretical physics Particle physics Quantum field theory Biophysics
- Workplaces: Technische Universität Darmstadt
- Doctoral advisor: Max von Laue

Friedrich Hans Beck (16 February 1927 – 20 December 2008) was a German physicist. His research interests were focused on superconductivity, nuclear and elementary particle physics, relativistic quantum field theory, and late in his life, biophysics and theory of consciousness.

== Early life and education ==
Beck was born in Wiesbaden, Germany. He was the son of the businessman Fritz Beck and his wife Margaret Cron. Beck attended the Grammar School in Darmstadt and after that studied physics at the University of Göttingen and the Technische Universität Darmstadt. As a student of Max von Laue, he performed research on superconductivity. In the spring of 1950 Beck started work on his PhD thesis entitled "The electrodynamic potential in the extended phenomenological theory of superconductivity", which he defended 1952 at University of Göttingen and obtained Doctor rerum naturalium.

== Academic career ==
From 1952 to 1954, Beck worked as an assistant at the Fritz Haber Institute in Berlin. He followed a research visit in the U.S. from 1954 to 1956 as a research associate at the Massachusetts Institute of Technology, then went back to the Ludwig-Maximilians-Universität München, where in 1958 he wrote a Habilitation thesis on nuclear reactions as a result of electromagnetic interactions. From 1958 to 1960, he worked as a lecturer both at the Ludwig-Maximilians-Universität München and Heidelberg University.

In 1960, Beck was appointed an Associate Professor of Theoretical Physics at Goethe University Frankfurt.

In 1963, he became a Professor of Theoretical Physics at the Technische Universität Darmstadt, where in the same year he took over the management of the Institute for Theoretical Nuclear Physics.

Beck held visiting professorship positions several times. From 1974 to 1975, he taught at the Lawrence Berkeley National Laboratory, in 1976 at the Universidade Federal Rural do Rio de Janeiro, in 1979 at the University of Maryland, College Park, in 1983 at the Weizmann Institute of Science in Rehovot, in 1987 at the University of Washington in Seattle, in 1988 at the Ben-Gurion University of the Negev in Beersheba, and in 1991 at the University of the Witwatersrand in Johannesburg.

After Beck's retirement in 1995, his successor at the Technische Universität Darmstadt became Professor Jochen Wambach.

== Collaboration with John C. Eccles ==
Presynaptic neuron A (transmitting) to postsynaptic neuron B (receiving): 1. Mitochondrion; 2. Synaptic vesicle with neurotransmitters; 3. Autoreceptor; 4. Synapse with neurotransmitter released (serotonin); 5. Postsynaptic receptors activated by neurotransmitter (induction of a postsynaptic potential); 6. Calcium channel; 7. Exocytosis of a vesicle; 8. Recaptured neurotransmitter

In 1991, Friedrich Beck met sir John Carew Eccles, a 1963 Nobel Laureate in Physiology or Medicine, during a summer school in Northern Italy organized by a German foundation for the promotion of outstanding students. In collaboration, they developed a quantum mechanical model of exocytosis and neurotransmitter release at synapses in the human cerebral cortex. The model endorses interactionist dualism and postulates that human consciousness could affect the functioning of synapses in the brain through quantum tunneling of electrons between the lipid bilayers of the synaptic vesicle and the presynaptic membrane. The tunneling of electrons triggers the process of exocytosis and thus initiates the transmission of information from the presynaptic neuron towards the postsynaptic neuron. The model proposed by Beck and Eccles is based on pure quantum tunneling and predicts temperature independence of exocytosis, which has been experimentally tested and found to be incorrect. Nevertheless, recent research has shown that the original Beck-Eccles model could be updated and zipping of SNARE proteins in exocytosis could be triggered by vibrationally assisted tunneling.
