= Heinrich Gerber =

Heinrich Gerber may refer to:

- Heinrich Gerber (architect)
- Heinrich Gerber (civil engineer)
