= Max von Laue =

German physicist (1879–1960)

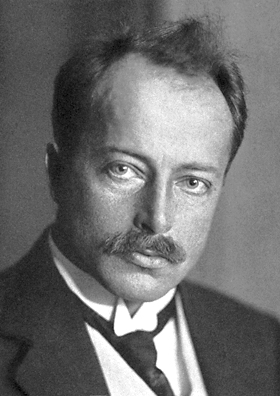
- Laue in 1914
- Born: Max Theodor Felix Laue; 9 October 1879; Pfaffendorf, German Empire
- Died: 24 April 1960 (aged 80); West Berlin, West Germany
- Resting place: Stadtfriedhof
- Education: University of Berlin (PhD); LMU Munich (DSc)
- Known for: X-ray diffraction; Laue equations; Stress–energy tensor
- Spouse: Magdalene Degen (m. 1910)
- Children: 2, including Theodore H. Von Laue
- Awards: Matteucci Medal (1914); Nobel Prize in Physics (1914); Max Planck Medal (1932)
- Scientific career
- Fields: Physics
- Workplaces: University of Berlin; LMU Munich; University of Zurich; University of Frankfurt am Main
- Thesis: Über die Interferenzerscheinungen an planparallelen Platten (1903)
- Doctoral advisor: Max Planck
- Other academic advisors: Arnold Sommerfeld
- Doctoral students: Friedrich Beck; Karl-Otto Kiepenheuer; Nikhil Ranjan Sen; Leo Szilard
- Other notable students: Johannes Geiss; Maurice Goldhaber; Karl Herzfeld; Fritz London; Werner Reichardt; Eugene Wigner

Max Theodor Felix von Laue (German: [maks fɔn ˈlaʊ̯ə]; 9 October 1879 – 24 April 1960) was a German physicist who received the Nobel Prize in Physics in 1914 "for his discovery of the diffraction of X-rays by crystals."

In addition to his scientific endeavors with contributions in optics, crystallography, quantum theory, superconductivity, and the theory of relativity, Laue had a number of administrative positions which advanced and guided German scientific research and development during four decades. A strong objector to Nazism, he was instrumental in re-establishing and organizing German science after World War II.

== Education ==
Max Theodor Felix Laue was born on 9 October 1879 in Pfaffendorf (now part of Koblenz), Kingdom of Prussia, German Empire, the son of Minna (née Zerrenner) and Julius Laue. In 1898, after passing his Abitur, Laue did one year of military service, after which he started to study mathematics, physics, and chemistry at the University of Strasbourg. He then went to the University of Göttingen, where he was greatly influenced by Woldemar Voigt and Max Abraham. In 1902, after one semester at the Ludwig-Maximilians-Universität München, Laue went to the Friedrich Wilhelm University of Berlin, where he studied under Max Planck, who gave birth to the quantum theory revolution on 14 December 1900, when he delivered his famous paper before the German Physical Society.

At the Friedrich Wilhelm University of Berlin, Laue attended lectures by Otto Lummer on heat radiation and interference spectroscopy, the influence of which can be seen in Laue's thesis on interference phenomena in plane-parallel plates, for which he received a Doctor of Philosophy in 1903. In 1906, he completed his habilitation under Arnold Sommerfeld at the Ludwig-Maximilians-Universität München.

== Career and research ==
In 1906, Laue became a Privatdozent at the University of Berlin. There, he met Albert Einstein for the first time; their friendship contributed to the acceptance and development of Einstein's theory of relativity. At the University of Berlin, he worked on the application of entropy to radiation fields and on the thermodynamic significance of the coherence of light waves.

In 1909, Laue became a Privatdozent at the Ludwig-Maximilians-Universität München. During the 1911 Christmas recess and in January 1912, Paul Peter Ewald was finishing the writing of his doctoral thesis under Arnold Sommerfeld. It was on a walk through the Englischer Garten (English Garden) in Munich in January, that Ewald told Laue about his thesis topic. The wavelengths of concern to Ewald were in the visible region of the spectrum and hence much larger than the spacing between the resonators in Ewald's crystal model. He seemed distracted and wanted to know what would be the effect if much smaller wavelengths were considered. In June, Sommerfeld reported to the Physical Society of Göttingen on the successful diffraction of X-rays by Laue, Paul Knipping, and Walter Friedrich at the Ludwig-Maximilians-Universität München, which earned Laue the Nobel Prize in Physics in 1914. While at the Ludwig-Maximilians-Universität München, he wrote the first volume of his book on relativity from 1910 to 1911.

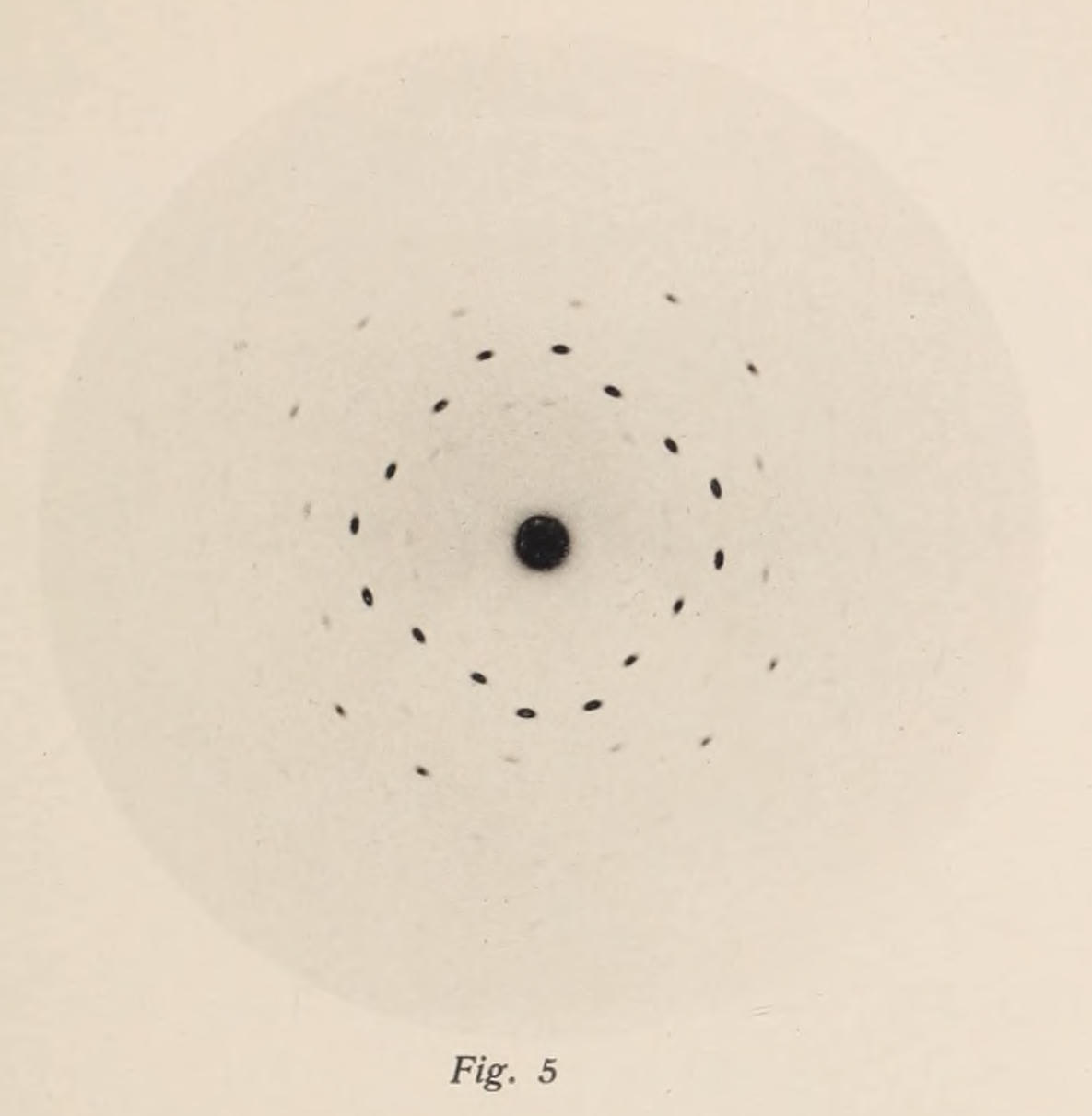
One of the zincblende X-ray interference patterns published in Laue's 1912 paper

In 1912, Laue became Professor of Physics at the University of Zurich, and in 1914 was appointed Ordinarius Professor of Theoretical Physics at the University of Frankfurt am Main. From 1916, he was engaged in vacuum tube development at the University of Würzburg for use in military telephony and wireless communication.

From 1919 to 1943, Laue was Ordinarius Professor of Physics at the University of Berlin, where in 1919 other notables were Walther Nernst, Fritz Haber, and James Franck. Laue, as one of the organizers of the weekly Berlin Physics Colloquium, typically sat in the front row with Nernst and Einstein, who would come over from the Kaiser Wilhelm Institute for Physics (KWIP) in Berlin-Dahlem, of which he was the director. Among his students at the university were Leó Szilárd and Fritz London. Laue published the second volume of his book on relativity in 1921.

As a consultant to the Physikalisch-Technische Reichsanstalt (PTR), Laue met Walther Meissner, who was working there on superconductivity. Meissner had discovered that a weak magnetic field decays rapidly to zero in the interior of a superconductor, which is known as the Meissner effect. In 1932, he showed that the threshold of the applied magnetic field which destroys superconductivity varies with the shape of the body. He published a total of 12 papers and a book on superconductivity. One of the papers was co-authored with brothers Fritz and Heinz London. Meissner published a biography on him in 1960.

The Kaiser Wilhelm Society was founded in 1911; its purpose was to promote the sciences by founding and maintaining research institutes. One such institute was the KWIP founded in 1914, with Einstein as its director. Laue was a trustee of the KWIP from 1917, and in 1922 he was appointed deputy director, whereupon he took over the administrative duties from Einstein. Einstein was traveling abroad when Adolf Hitler became Chancellor of Germany in January 1933, and Einstein did not return. He then became acting director of the KWIP, a position he held until 1946 or 1948, except for the period 1935–1939, when Peter Debye was director. In 1943, to avoid casualties to the personnel, the KWIP moved to Hechingen. It was at Hechingen that he wrote his book on the history of physics, Geschichte der Physik, which was eventually translated into seven other languages.

=== Opposition to Nazism ===
Laue opposed Nazism in general, and Deutsche Physik in particular; the former persecuted the Jews, and the latter, among other things, put down the theory of relativity as "Jewish physics", which he saw as ridiculous: "science has no race or religion". He and his close friend, Otto Hahn, secretly helped scientific colleagues persecuted by Nazi policies to emigrate from Germany. He also openly opposed antisemitism. An address on 18 September 1933 at the opening of the physics convention in Würzburg, opposition to Johannes Stark, an obituary note on Fritz Haber in 1934, and attendance at a commemoration for Haber are examples of Laue's open opposition that earned him multiple government reprimands.

- Laue, as Chairman of the German Physical Society, gave the opening address at the 1933 physics convention. In it, he compared the persecution of Galileo and the oppression of his scientific views on the solar theory of Copernicus to the then conflict and persecution over the theory of relativity by the proponents of Deutsche Physik, against the work of Einstein, labeled "Jewish physics."
- Stark, who had received the Nobel Prize in Physics in 1919, wished to become the Führer of German physics and was a proponent of Deutsche Physik. Against the unanimous advice of those consulted, Stark was appointed President of the PTR in May 1933. However, Laue successfully blocked Stark's regular membership in the Prussian Academy of Sciences.
- Haber received the Nobel Prize in Chemistry in 1918. In spite of this and his many other contributions to Germany, he was forced to emigrate from Germany as a result of the Law for the Restoration of the Professional Civil Service, which removed Jews from their jobs. Laue's obituary note praising Haber and comparing his forced emigration to the expulsion of Themistocles from Athens was a direct affront to National Socialism.
- In connection with Haber; Max Planck, Otto Hahn, and Laue organized a commemoration event held in Berlin-Dahlem on 29 January 1935, the first anniversary of Haber's death – attendance at the event by professors in the civil service had been expressly forbidden by the government. While many scientific and technical personnel were represented at the memorial by their wives, Laue and Wolfgang Heubner were the only two professors to attend. This was yet another blatant demonstration of Laue's opposition to National Socialism. The date of the first anniversary of Haber's death was also one day before the second anniversary of National Socialism seizing power in Germany, thus further increasing the affront given by holding the event.

In particular, the struggle between Laue and Planck regarding the Nazi takeover of the Prussian Academy of Sciences has been extensively documented. Ultimately, in response to Laue blocking Stark's regular membership in the Prussian Academy of Sciences, Stark had Laue sacked from his position as advisor to the PTR in December 1933, which Laue had held since 1925.

In a commonly reported anecdote Laue is supposed to have carried parcels in his hands when exiting his house, so to avoid having to give the Nazi Salute.

=== Hidden Nobel Prize ===
When Germany invaded Denmark in World War II, the Hungarian chemist George de Hevesy dissolved the Nobel Prize gold medals of Laue and James Franck in aqua regia to prevent the Nazis from discovering them. At the time, it was illegal to take gold out of the country, and if it had been discovered that Laue had done so, he could have faced prosecution in Germany. Hevesy placed the resulting solution on a shelf in his laboratory at the Niels Bohr Institute. After the war, he returned to find the solution undisturbed and precipitated the gold out of the acid. The Nobel Society then re-cast the Nobel Prize gold medals, using the original gold.

=== Post-war ===
On 23 April 1945, French troops entered Hechingen, followed the next day by a contingent of Operation Alsos—an operation to investigate the German nuclear energy effort, seize equipment, and prevent German scientists from being captured by the Soviets. The scientific advisor to the Operation was the Dutch-American physicist Samuel Goudsmit, who, adorned with a steel helmet, appeared at Laue's home. Laue was taken into custody and taken to Huntingdon, England, and interned at Farm Hall with other scientists thought to be involved in nuclear research and development.

While incarcerated, Laue was a reminder to the other detainees that one could survive the Nazi reign without having "compromised"; this alienated him from others being detained. During his incarceration, he wrote a paper on the absorption of X-rays under interference conditions, which it was later published in Acta Crystallographica. On 2 October 1945, Laue, Otto Hahn, and Werner Heisenberg, were taken to meet with Henry Hallett Dale, President of the Royal Society, and other members of the society. There, he was invited to attend the 9 November 1945 Royal Society meeting in memory of the German physicist Wilhelm Röntgen, who discovered X-rays; however, permission was not forthcoming from the military authorities detaining him.

In early 1946, Laue returned to Germany, where he went back to being acting director of the KWIP, which had been moved to Göttingen. The same year, the Kaiser Wilhelm Society became the Max Planck Society, and the Kaiser Wilhelm Institute for Physics was renamed the Max Planck Institute for Physics. He also became an adjunct professor at the University of Göttingen. In addition to his administrative and teaching responsibilities, he wrote his book on superconductivity, Theorie der Supraleitung, and revised his books on electron diffraction, Materiewellen und ihre Interferenzen, and the first volume of his two-volume book on relativity.

In July 1946, Laue went back to England, only four months after having been interned there, to attend an international conference on crystallography. This was a distinct honor, as he was the only German invited to attend. He was extended many courtesies by the British officer who escorted him there and back, and a well-known English crystallographer as his host; Laue was even allowed to wander around London on his own.

After the war, there was much to be done in re-establishing and organizing German scientific endeavors. Laue participated in some key roles; in 1946, he initiated the founding of the German Physical Society in only the British Occupation Zone, as the Allied Control Council would not initially allow organizations across occupation zone boundaries. During the war, the PTR had been dispersed; Laue, from 1946 to 1948, worked on its reunification across three zones and its location at new facilities in Braunschweig. Additionally, it took on a new name as the Physikalisch-Technische Bundesanstalt, but administration was not taken over by Germany until after the formation of West Germany on 23 May 1949. In 1948, the President of the American Physical Society asked Laue to report on the status of physics in Germany; his report was published in 1949 in the American Journal of Physics. In 1950, he participated in the creation of the Verband Deutscher Physikalischer Gesellschaften, formerly affiliated under the Nordwestdeutsche Physikalische Gesellschaft.

In April 1951, Laue became Director of the Max-Planck-Institut für physikalische Chemie und Elektrochemie, a position he held until 1959. In 1953, at the request of Laue, the institute was renamed the Fritz-Haber-Institut für physikalische Chemie und Elektrochemie der Max-Planck-Gesellschaft.

== Personal life and death ==
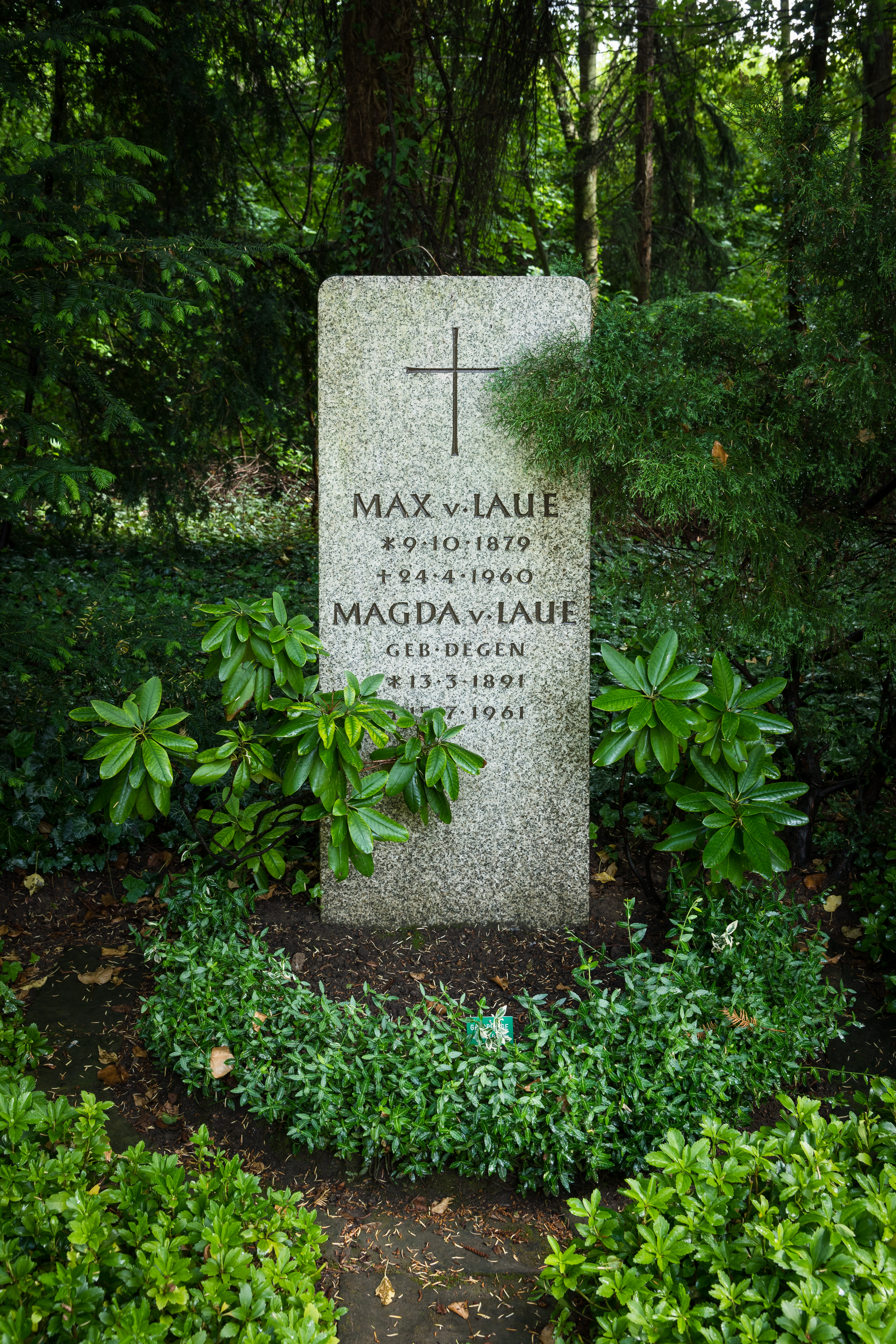
Laue's grave in the Stadtfriedhof

It was in 1913 that Laue's father, Julius Laue, a civil servant in the military administration, was raised into the ranks of hereditary nobility, thus he became Max von Laue. In 1910, Laue married Magdalene Degen, with whom he had two children. Their son, Theodor (1916–2000), went to the United States in 1937, and received his B.A. and Ph.D. from Princeton University. After his service in the U.S. Army, Theodor taught modern history as a professor at various U.S. universities.

Among Laue's chief recreational activities were mountaineering, motoring in his automobile, motor-biking, sailing, and skiing. While not a mountain climber, he did enjoy hiking on the Alpine glaciers with his friends.

On 8 April 1960, while Laue was driving to his laboratory in West Berlin, his car was struck by a motorcyclist, who had received his license only two days earlier. The motorcyclist was killed and Laue's car was overturned. He died from his injuries sixteen days later on 24 April at the age of 80. He had asked that his epitaph should read that he had died trusting firmly in God's mercy. He is buried in the Stadtfriedhof in Göttingen.

== Organizations ==
- 1919: Corresponding member of the Prussian Academy of Sciences
- 1921: Regular member of the Prussian Academy of Sciences
- From 1921: Chairman of the physics commission of the Notgemeinschaft der Deutschen Wissenschaft (Renamed in 1937: Deutsche Gemeinschaft zur Erhaltung und Förderun der Forschung. No longer active by 1945.)
- From 1922: Member of the Board of Trustees of the Potsdam Astrophysics Observatory
- 1925 – 1933: Advisor to the Physikalisch-Technische Reichsanstalt (Today: Physikalisch-Technische Bundesanstalt). Laue had been sacked in 1933 from his advisory position by Johannes Stark, Nobel Prize recipient and President of the Physikalisch-Technische Reichsanstalt, in retribution for Laue's open opposition to the Nazis by blocking Stark's regular membership in the Prussian Academy of Sciences.
- 1931 – 1933: Chairman of the Deutsche Physikalische Gesellschaft

== Recognition ==
=== Awards ===
Year	Organization	Award	Citation	Ref.
1914	Accademia dei XL	Matteucci Medal	—	
1914	Royal Swedish Academy of Sciences	Nobel Prize in Physics	"For his discovery of the diffraction of X-rays by crystals."	
1932	German Physical Society	Max Planck Medal	—	

=== Memberships ===
Year	Organization	Type	Ref.
1924	Accademia dei Lincei	Foreign Member	
1948	American Academy of Arts and Sciences	International Honorary Member	
1949	Royal Society	Foreign Member	
1949	American Philosophical Society	International Member	
1955	Pontifical Academy of Sciences	Academician	
1958	National Academy of Sciences	International Member	

=== Honors ===
Year	Country	Honor	Ref.
1952	West Germany	Pour le Mérite	

== Publications ==
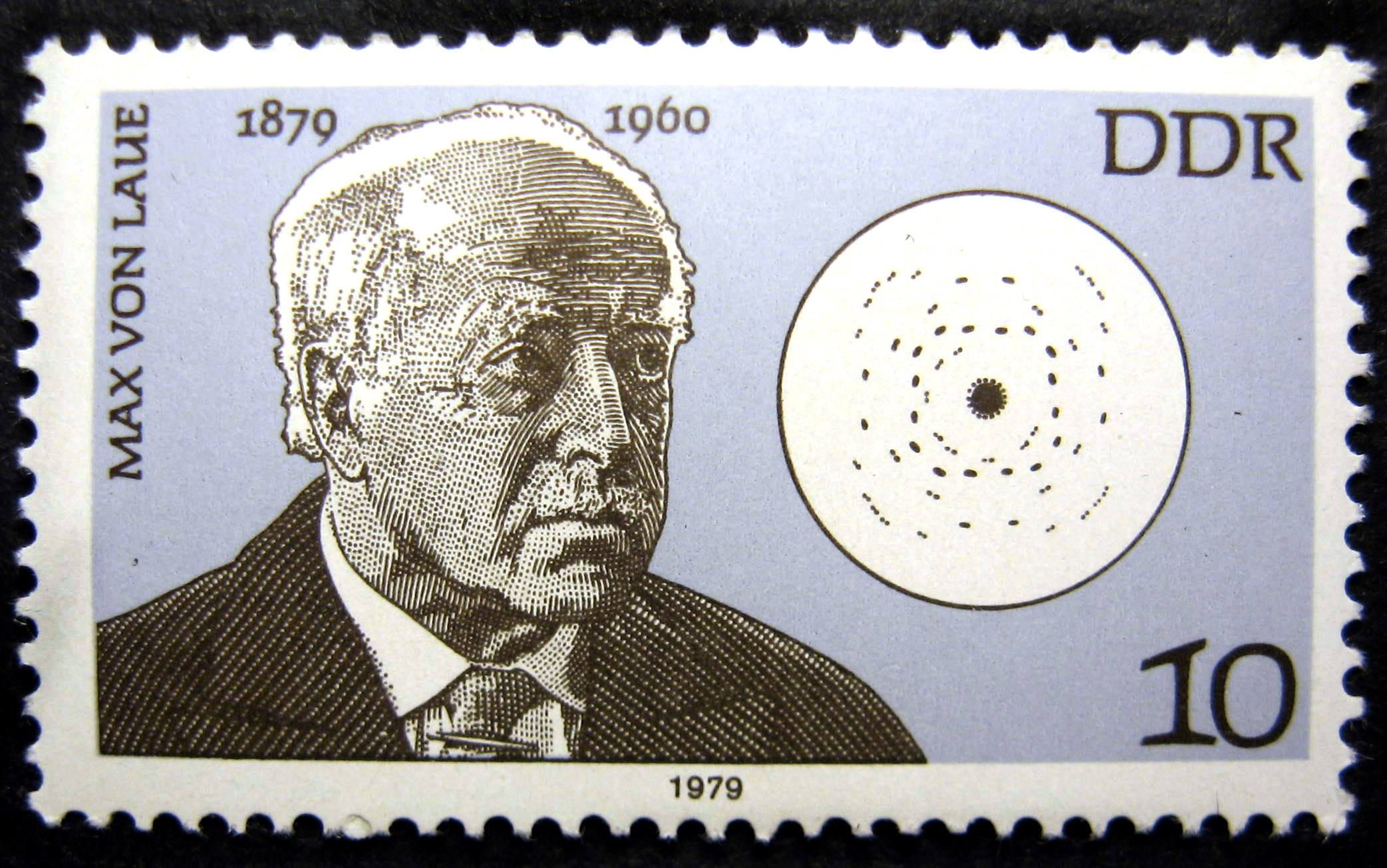
Deutsche Post (der DDR) Briefmarke (postage stamp), 1979

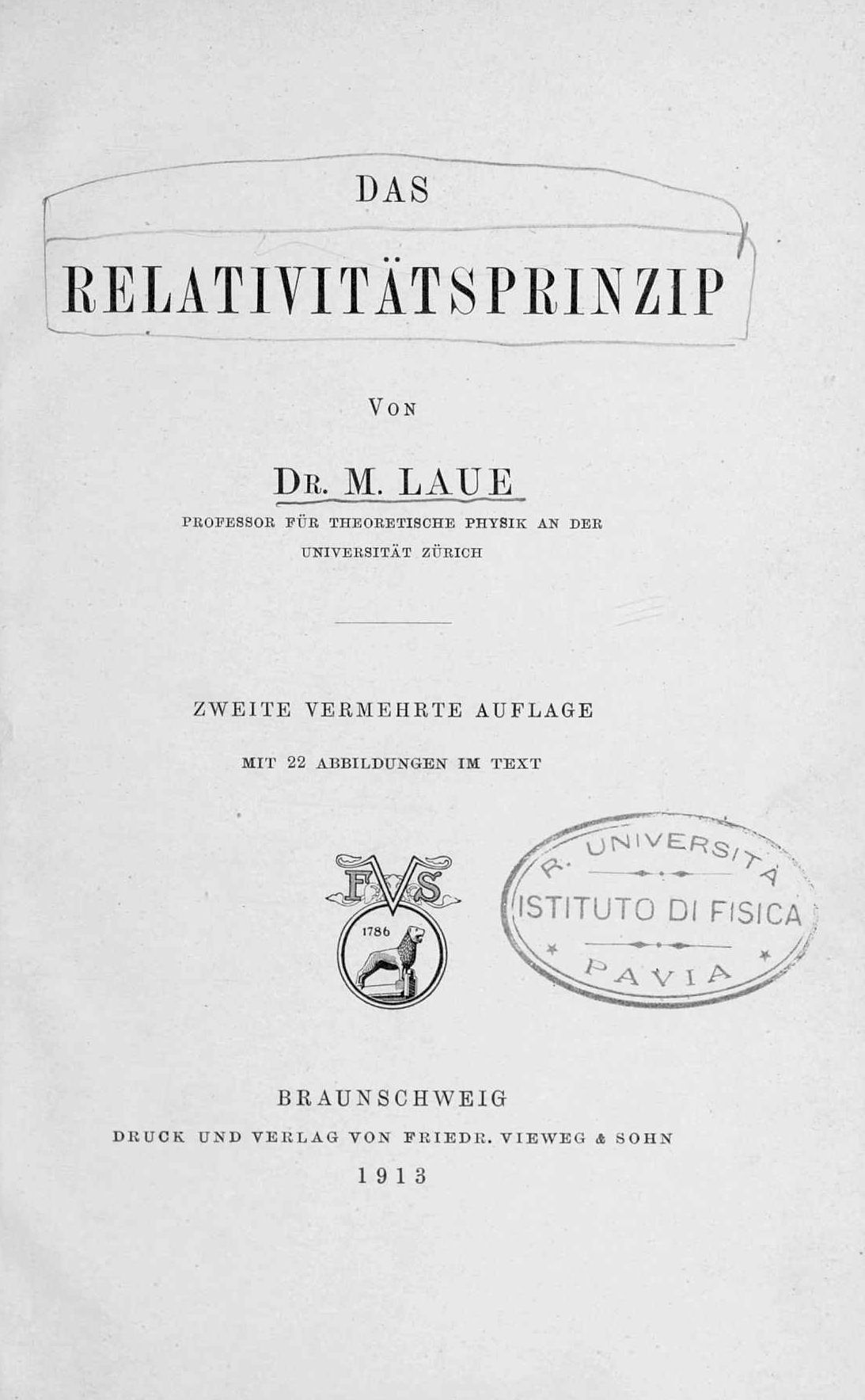
Relativitätsprinzip, 1913

- Max von Laue Die Relativitätstheorie. Band 1: Die spezielle Relativitätstheorie (Friedr. Vieweg & Sohn, Braunschweig, 1911, and 1919)
- Max von Laue Die Relativitätstheorie. Erster Band. Das Relativitätsprinzip der Lorentz-transformation. Vierte vermehrte Auflage. (Friedr. Vieweg & Sohn, 1921)
- Max von Laue Die Relativitätstheorie. Zweiter Band : Die Allgemeine Relativitätstheorie Und Einsteins Lehre Von Der Schwerkraft (Friedr. Vieweg & Sohn, Braunschweig, 1921 and 1923)
- Max von Laue Korpuskular- und Wellentheorie (Leipzig, 1933)
- Max von Laue Die Interferenzen von Röntgen- und Elektronenstrahlen. Fünf Vorträge. (Springer, 1935)
- Max von Laue Eine Ausgestaltung der Londonschen Theorie der Supraleitung (Barth, 1942)
- Max von Laue Materiewellen und ihre Interferenzen (Akadem. Verl.-Ges. Becker & Erler, 1944) (Geest und Portig, 1948)
- Max von Laue Theorie der Supraleitung (Springer, 1947 and 1949)
  - Max von Laue, translated by Lothar Meyer and William Band Theory of Superconductivity (N.Y., 1952)
- Max von Laue Geschichte der Physik (Univ.-Verl., 1946 and 1947), (Athenäum-Verl., 1950) and (Ullstein Taschenbücher-Verl., 1959, 1966 and 1982) [This book was translated into seven other languages.]
  - Max von Laue, translated by Ralph E. Oesper History of Physics (Academic Press, 1950)
  - Max von Laue Histoire De La Physique (Lamarre, 1953)
  - Max von Laue Geschiedenis der natuurkunde ('s Gravenhage, Stols, 1950 and 1954)
- Max Planck and Max von Laue Wissenschaftliche Selbstbiographie (Barth, 1948)
- Max von Laue Röntgenstrahlinterferenzen (Akadem. Verl.-Ges., 1948)
- Max von Laue Die Relativitätstheorie. Bd. 2. Die allgemeine Relativitätstheorie (Vieweg, 1953)
- Max Planck and Max von Laue Vorlesungen über Thermodynamik de Gruyter (Gebundene, 1954)
- Walter Friedrich, Paul Knipping, and Max von Laue Interferenzerscheinungen bei Röntgenstrahlen (J. A. Barth, 1955)
- Max von Laue Die Relativitätstheorie. Bd. 1. Die spezielle Relativitätstheorie (Vieweg, 1955)
- Max von Laue Die Relativitätstheorie. Bd. 2. Die allgemeine Relativitätstheorie (Vieweg, 1956)
- Max von Laue Max von Laue
- Max von Laue Röntgenwellenfelder in Kristallen (Akademie-Verl., 1959)
- Max von Laue Von Laue-Festschrift. 1 (Akadem. Verl.-Ges., 1959)
- Max von Laue Von Laue-Festschrift. 2 (Akadem. Verl.-Ges., 1960)
- Max von Laue and Ernst Heinz Wagner Röntgenstrahl-Interferenzen (Akadem. Verl.-Ges., 1960)
- Max von Laue and Friedrich Beck Die Relativitätstheorie. Bd. 1. Die spezielle Relativitätstheorie (Vieweg, 1961 and 1965)
- Max von Laue Gesammelte Schriften und Vorträge. Bd. 1 (Vieweg, 1961)
- Max von Laue Gesammelte Schriften und Vorträge. Bd. 2 (Vieweg, 1961)
- Max von Laue Gesammelte Schriften und Vorträge. Bd. 3 (Vieweg, 1961)
- Max von Laue Aufsätze und Vorträge (Vieweg, 1961 and 1962)
- Max von Laue and Friedrich Beck Die Relativitätstheorie. Bd. 2. Die allgemeine Relativitätstheorie (Vieweg, 1965)
- Max von Laue Die Relativitätstheorie II. Die allgemeine Relativitätstheorie (Vieweg Friedr. und Sohn Ver, 1982)

=== Other publications ===
- Friedrich W, Knipping P, von Laue M (1912). "Interferenz-Erscheinungen bei Röntgenstrahlen" (PDF). Sitzungsberichte der Mathematisch-Physikalischen Classe der Königlich-Bayerischen Akademie der Wissenschaften zu München [Interference phenomena in X-rays]. 1912: 303.
- Laue, Max von (1913). "Kritische Bemerkungen zu den Deutungen der Photogramme von Friedrich und Knipping". Physikalische Zeitschrift. 14 (10): 421–423. Received 1 April 1913, published in issue No. 10 of 15 May 1913. As cited in Mehra, Volume 5, Part 2, 2001, p. 922.
- Laue, Max von (1913). "Zur Optik der Raumgitter". Physikalische Zeitschrift. 14 (21): 1040–1041. Received 1 October 1913, published in issue No. 21 of 1 November 1913. As cited in Mehra, Volume 5, Part 2, 2001, p. 922.
- Laue, Max von (1913). "Röntgenstrahlinterferenzen". Physikalische Zeitschrift. 14 (22/23): 1075–1079. Presented on 24 September 1913 at the 85th Naturforscherversammlung, Vienna, published in issue No. 22/23 of 15 November 1913. As cited in Mehra, Volume 5, Part 2, 2001, p. 922.
- Laue, Max von (1913). "Zur Optik der Raumgitter". Physikalische Zeitschrift. 14 (25): 1286–1287. Received 21 November 1913, published in issue No. 25 of 15 December 1913. As cited in Mehra, Volume 5, Part 2, 2001, p. 922.
- Laue, Max von; Fritz London; Heinz London (1935). "Zur Theorie der Supraleitung". Zeitschrift für Physik. 96 (5–6): 359–364. Bibcode:1935ZPhy...96..359L. doi:10.1007/BF01343868. S2CID 122522994.

== See also ==
- History of special relativity
- Twin paradox
- History of the twin paradox
- Laue equations
- Sagnac effect
- Trouton–Noble experiment
- Einstein synchronisation
- Institut Laue–Langevin
- Laue (crater)
- 10762 von Laue

== Sources ==
- Hentschel, Klaus, ed. (1996). Physics and National Socialism: An Anthology of Primary Sources. Ann M. Hentschel (translator). Basel: Birkhäuser Verlag. ISBN 0-8176-5312-0.
- Walker, Mark H. (1995). Nazi science: myth, truth, and the German atomic bomb. New York: Plenum Press. ISBN 0-306-44941-2.
