= Nikhil Ranjan Sen =

Indian physicist and polymath (1894–1974)

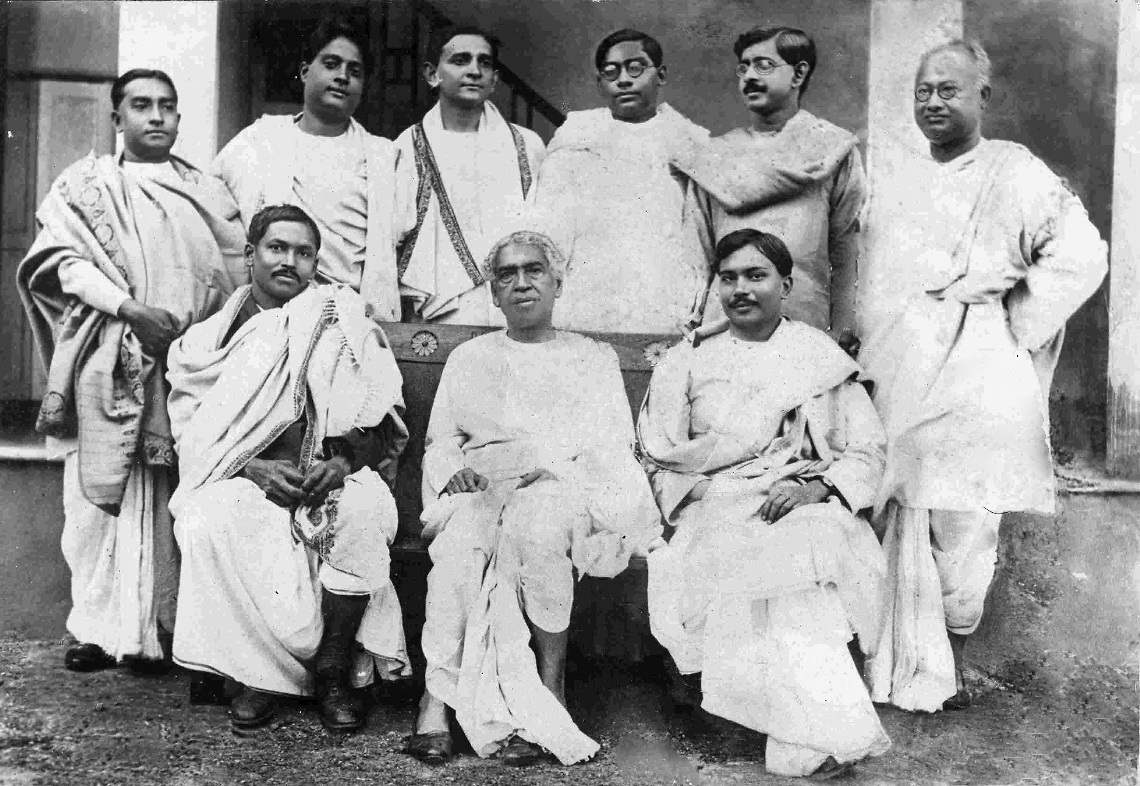
- Nikhil Ranjan Sen (standing, fourth from left) of Calcutta University with other scientists.
- Born: 23 May 1894; Dhaka, Bengal Presidency, British India
- Died: 13 January 1963 (aged 68); Calcutta, India
- Education: Presidency College; University of Calcutta; University of Berlin
- Scientific career
- Fields: Applied Mathematics; Theory of Relativity
- Workplaces: University of Calcutta
- Academic advisors: Max von Laue

Nikhil Ranjan Sen (23 May 1894 – 13 January 1963) was an Indian-Bengali scientist who was a pioneer in the field of general relativity and called the father of applied mathematics in India. He received his PhD from Humboldt University of Berlin under the supervision of Max von Laue, thus becoming the first Indian to get a doctorate in relativity. Sen also worked on cosmogony, fluid dynamics, potential theory and probability, and founded the first fluid dynamics laboratory in India. He pioneered the study of ballistics and missiles in India and was also an advocate for science education in the Bengali language. His Bengali-language book titled "Soura Jagat" (The Solar System) was published by Visva-Bharati in 1949.

== Early life and education ==
Nikhil Ranjan Sen was born on 23 May 1894 in Dhaka, the youngest of their four sons and four daughters of Kalimohan Sen and his wife Vidhumukhi Devi. He attended Dhaka Collegiate School, where his classmate was the would be scientist Meghnad Saha. He would complete his schooling at Rajshahi Collegiate School. In 1909, he received a scholarship with his third position in order of merit for the entrance examination of Calcutta University. After passing the intermediate examination in 1911, he studied honors mathematics in Presidency College in Calcutta, where he had Saha and Satyendranath Bose as classmates. Bose, Saha, and Sen got the three highest spots in the 1913 honors examination in Calcutta University. They went on to become postgraduate students in Presidency College. Sen topped the 1916 Mixed Mathematics examination, a year after Bose and Saha topped the same exam.

== Career and research ==
Sen, Saha, and Bose joined the postgraduate department of mathematics in University of Calcutta at almost the same time in 1917. During this period, his papers on Newtonian potential, solid geometry, elasticity, and hydrodynamics were published in Philosophical Magazine and in the Bulletin of Calcutta Mathematical Society.

In 1921, his thesis "Potentials of Uniform" was approved by G.T. Walker, D.N. Mallik, and Asutosh Mukherjee to be worthy of completion of a DSc at the university. With an extra allowance of five hundred taka per month, he went to Germany for research work at the universities of Berlin, Munich, and Paris. His work with Professor Arnold Sommerfeld in Munich from 1921 to 1922 was published in the Physikalische Zeitschrift. In the summer of 1922, he went to Berlin and studied under Max von Laue in the newly established Institute for Physics. Under von Laue, Sen completed a Ph.D. at the University of Berlin for a general relativity dissertation on the boundary conditions for the gravitational field equations on surfaces of discontinuity. In his dissertation, Sen found that Einstein's equations imply that gravitational forces hold together the parts of a particle, then he calculated the equilibrium of a charged particle with a definite spherical boundary. Sen also worked with von Laue on de Sitter universe and changes in potential of ions and emitted electrons of glowing metals during his stint in Germany.

After returning home in 1924, he was appointed as "Rasbihari Ghosh Professor" in the newly formed Department of Applied Mathematics of Calcutta University. With Sen conducting and supervising research in areas related to the theory of relativity, he was considered the founder of the Calcutta School of Relativity in the 1930s. The Calcutta school investigated the effect of mass, density, radius, temperature and pressure in the stellar bodies. Sen refined models of the universe based on the General Theory of Relativity yet he was critical of Eddington and Milne's models.

In the early 1930s, Sen worked a considerable amount on wave mechanics and Dirac’ relativistic equations. He did some notable work on spherical harmonics and studied the relativistic effects in stellar bodies. Sen was a founding fellow of the Indian National Science Academy and Indian Science News Association in 1935. He was also a founding member of the Indian Statistical Institute (ISI) Council and founding fellow of the National Institute of Sciences of India. In 1936, he established the Computational Laboratory and Fluid Dynamics Laboratory in his department in Calcutta University, the first fluid dynamics laboratory in India. Sen started working on the internal constitution of stars around 1940, after Hans Bethe established the law of energy generation.

After the partition of India, he included ballistics in the curriculum as he believed that it is an important science for the national defense of newly free India.

In 1951, he was appointed Rippon Professor of the Indian Association for the Cultivation of Science and delivered three lectures on "The modern theory of turbulence". He proved the correctness and importance of the theories on turbulence of Heisenberg, Chandrasekhar, von Karmen and others.

He collaborated with his students to construct stellar models based on the theoretical laws of thermonuclear energy. In 1954, Sen and T.C. Roy gave a singularity-free analytical method that strictly satisfied all the necessary conditions and could be fitted to the field of expanding universe. Their method correctly gave Newtonian approximations without using Einstein's subsidiary equations. He retired in 1959.

== Science education in mother tongue ==
When the Calcutta University Commission was formed in 1917 for the improvement of the education system, he pushed for a system of teaching science subjects under the liberal education system. Similar to Satyendranath Bose, he pushed the University Commission for science education in the Bengali language. His book titled "Soura Jagat" (The Solar System) in Bengali was published by Visva-Bharati in 1949.

== Honorary titles ==
- 1934 - Member of "Earthquake Research Commission of India".
- 1935 - Fellow of Indian National Science Academy and Indian Science News Association
- 1935 - 1941 Member of the Council of the Indian National Science Academy
- 1936 - President of the Mathematics Department of the Indian Science Congress Organisation
- 1940 - 1941 Member of the Sectional Committee on Mathematics and Statistics of the Indian Science Congress Organisation
- 1949 - 1951 Council Member, Indian National Academy of Sciences
- 1951 - Ripon Professor, Indian Association for the Cultivation of Science, Calcutta
- 1952 - 1953 Indian Association for the Cultivation of Science Council Member of the Indian Association for the Cultivation of Science
- 1959-1960 Indian National Science Academy, vice-president.
