= Friedrich Carl Andreas =

German orientalist and linguist (1846–1930)

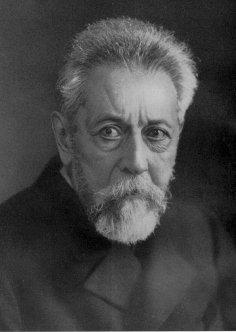
- Friedrich Carl Andreas in the 1920s
- Born: April 14, 1846; Batavia, Dutch East Indies
- Died: October 4, 1930 (aged 84); Göttingen, Germany
- Burial place: Stadtfriedhof
- Education: University of Erlangen–Nuremberg
- Occupations: Orientalist, Linguist, and University professor
- Employers: University of Göttingen; Humboldt University of Berlin
- Board member of: Göttingen Academy of Sciences
- Spouse: Lou Andreas-Salomé

Friedrich Carl Andreas (14 April 1846 in Batavia – 4 October 1930 in Göttingen) was an orientalist of German, Malay, and Armenian parentage (descendant of the Bagratuni royal family). He was the husband of psychoanalyst Lou Andreas-Salomé.

He received his education in Iranian and other oriental studies at several German universities, obtaining his doctorate at Erlangen in 1868 with a thesis on the Pahlavi language. Following graduation, he continued his research of Pahlavi in Copenhagen. From 1875 he spent several years conducting field studies in Persia and India, during which time, he also worked as a postmaster.

From 1883 to 1903 he gave private lessons in Turkish and Persian in Berlin, and afterwards became a professor of Iranian philology at the University of Göttingen. Here, he was tasked with deciphering manuscript fragments that were collected by the German Turfan expeditions in western China.

Not a prolific author of books, he preferred to share his knowledge with students and colleagues orally. His primary focus were the Iranian languages in their development from antiquity to the present; e.g. Afghan, Balochi, Ossetian, and Kurdish languages. He was also thoroughly familiar with Sanskrit, Hindustani, Arabic, Aramaic, Hebrew, Armenian, and Turkish. In addition, he was considered an excellent decipherer of manuscripts and inscriptions. Due to his linguistic talents, he was appointed to the "Königlich Preußische Phonographische Kommission" (Royal Prussian Phonographic Commission). The purpose of the commission was to record the approximately 250 languages spoken by the prisoners of German WWI PoW camps.
