= Stadtfriedhof (Göttingen) =

Historic cemetery in Lower Saxony, Germany

Coordinates: 51°31′57″N 9°54′35″E

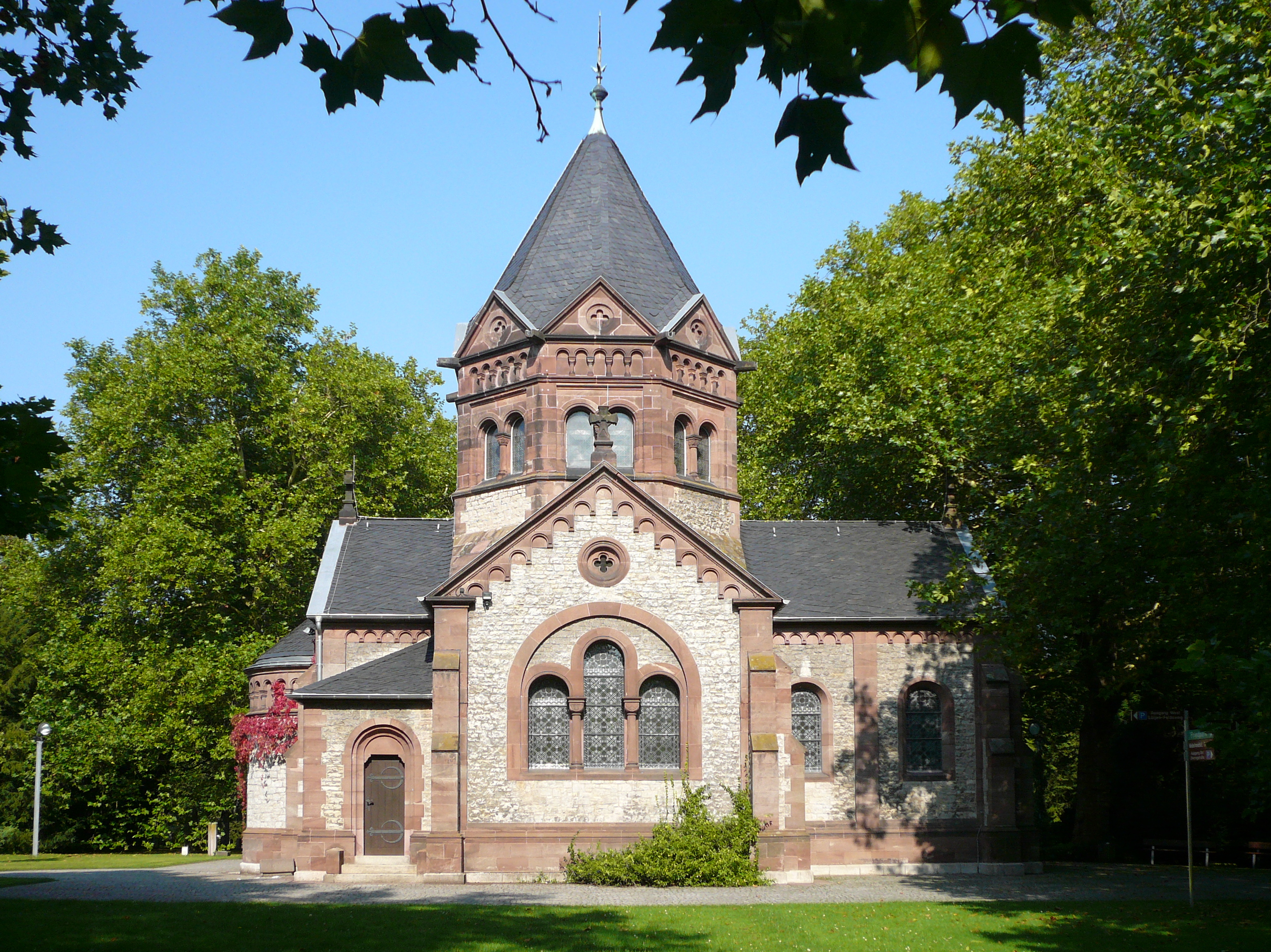
The Stadtfriedhof Chapel designed by city architect Heinrich Gerber

The old Stadtfriedhof (City Cemetery) in Göttingen is a historic cemetery with graves of important scholars. It is the final resting place of no less than nine Nobel Prize winners: Max Born, Otto Hahn, Max von Laue, Walther Nernst, Max Planck, Otto Wallach, Adolf Windaus, Richard Zsigmondy and Manfred Eigen.

== Location and history ==
The cemetery is located at the western edge of the city of Göttingen. The site has an area of about 36 acres (15 ha), on which there are approximately 60,000 burial and urn sites.

Due to the growing population of Göttingen in 1879 Mayor Georg Merkel decided to create a new cemetery at the city limits at Grone, today a suburb of Göttingen. The first section, which covered an area of 7.5 acres (3.0 ha), was inaugurated in December 1881, and replaced the Albanifriedhof as a burial site. The cemetery chapel was designed by city architect Heinrich Gerber during the first expansion of the cemetery around the turn of the century. This was the first of five expansions, the last of which was in 1963. In 1975 the town burial site was moved to the newly created Parkfriedhof Junkerberg. Since then, only existing burial rights are allowed at the Göttingen City Cemetery. A redesign of the site to a park has been repeatedly discussed, but has not yet been done.

During an air raid in the Second World War bombs dropped by the British Royal Air Force hit the cemetery on 1 January 1945, killing 7 Germans and 40 Russian prisoners-of-war.

In the centre of the cemetery about 1000 graves form a memorial cemetery for the victims of war and tyranny. There is also an old, small, Jewish cemetery on the northwest side of the cemetery, with burial sites dating back to 1843.

== Graves ==
Graves of Nobel Prize Winners
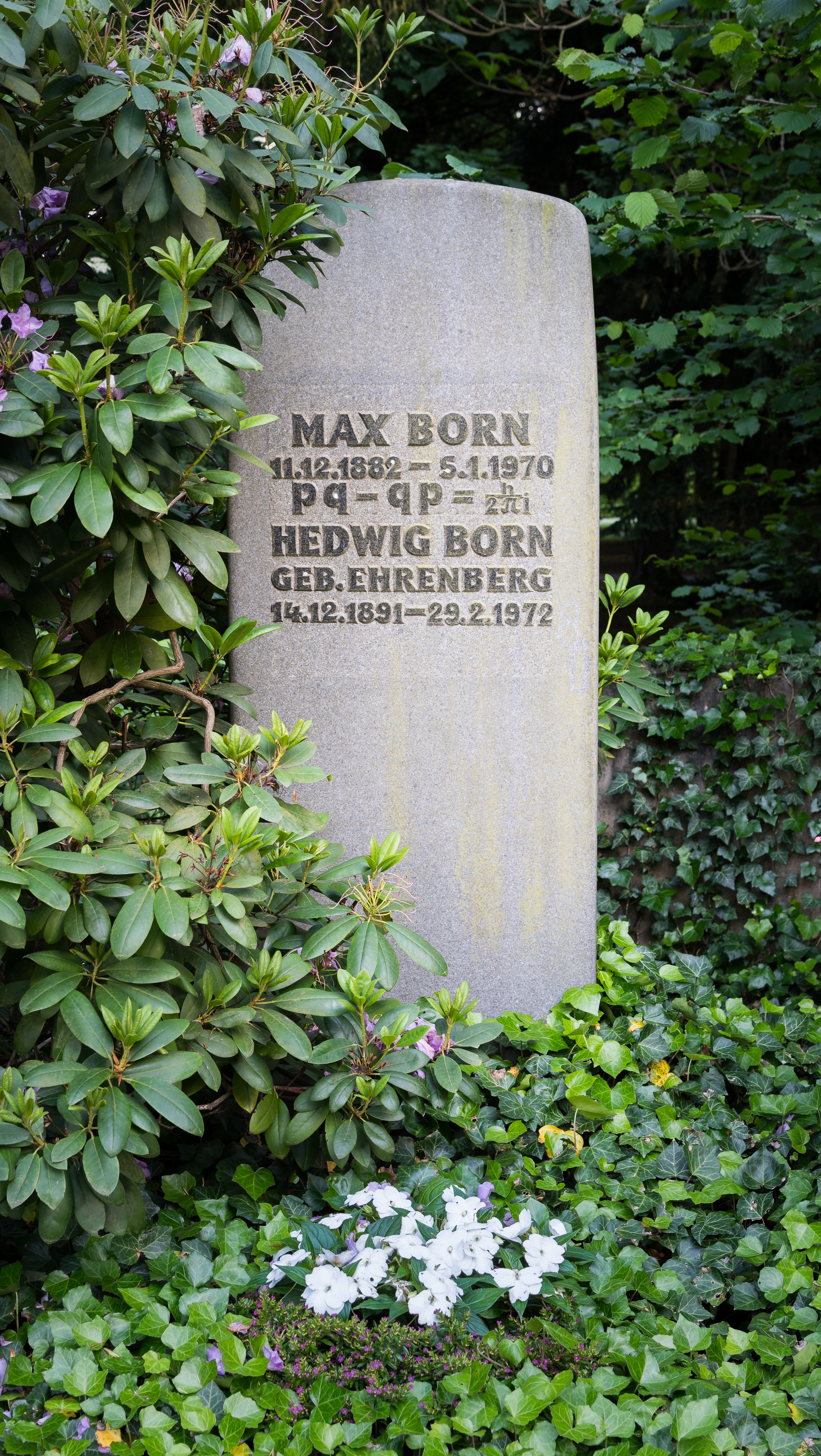
Max Born

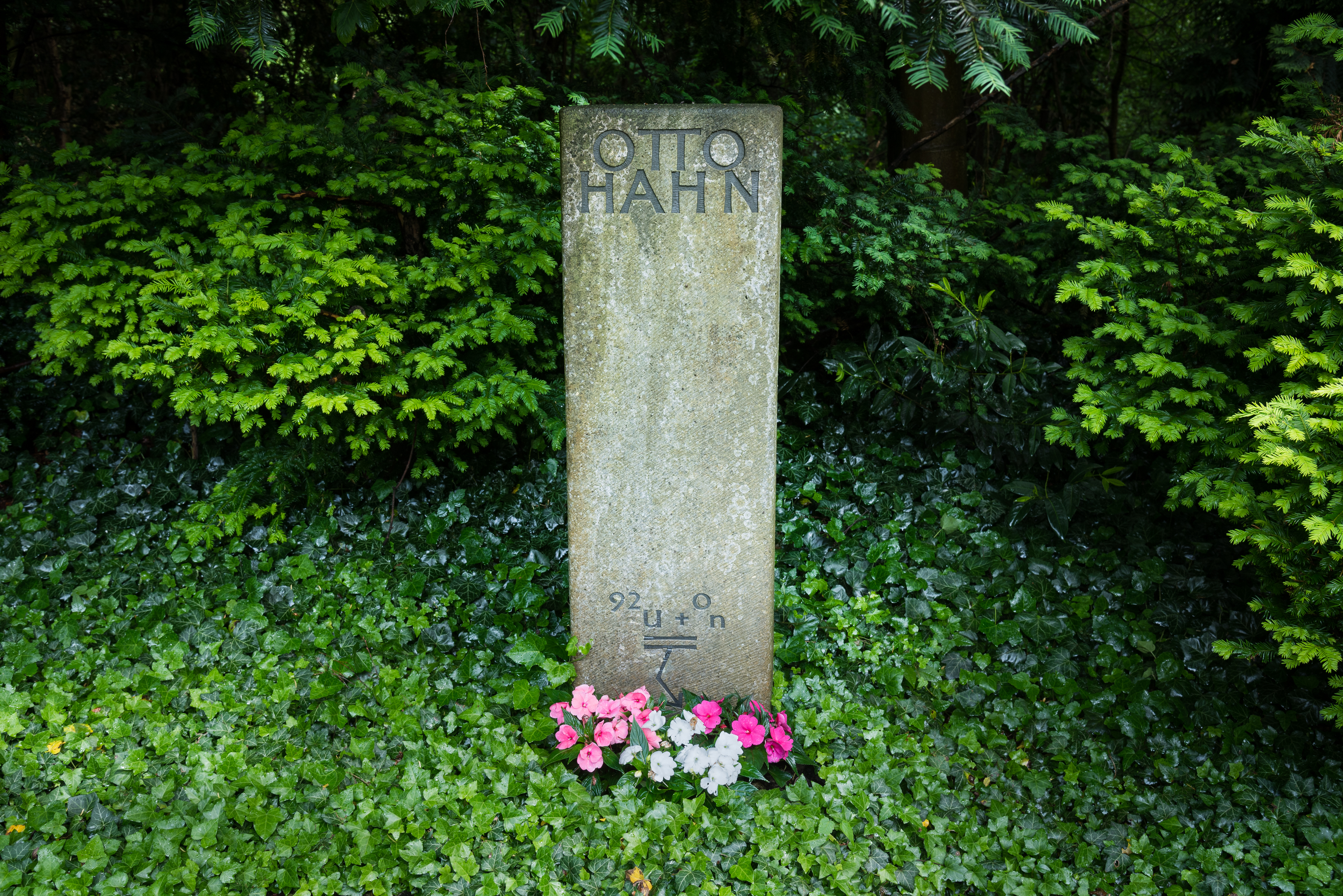
Otto Hahn

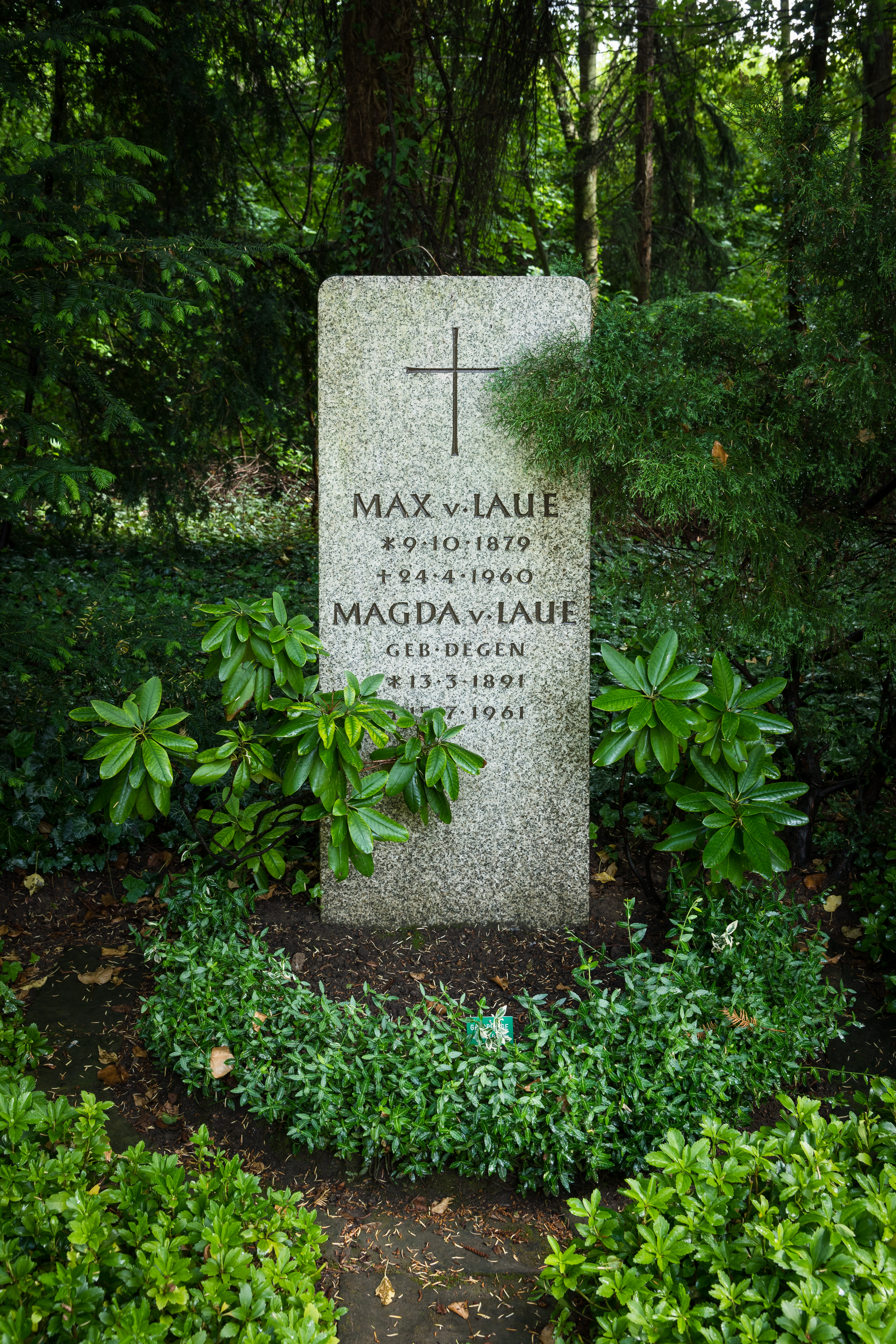
Max von Laue

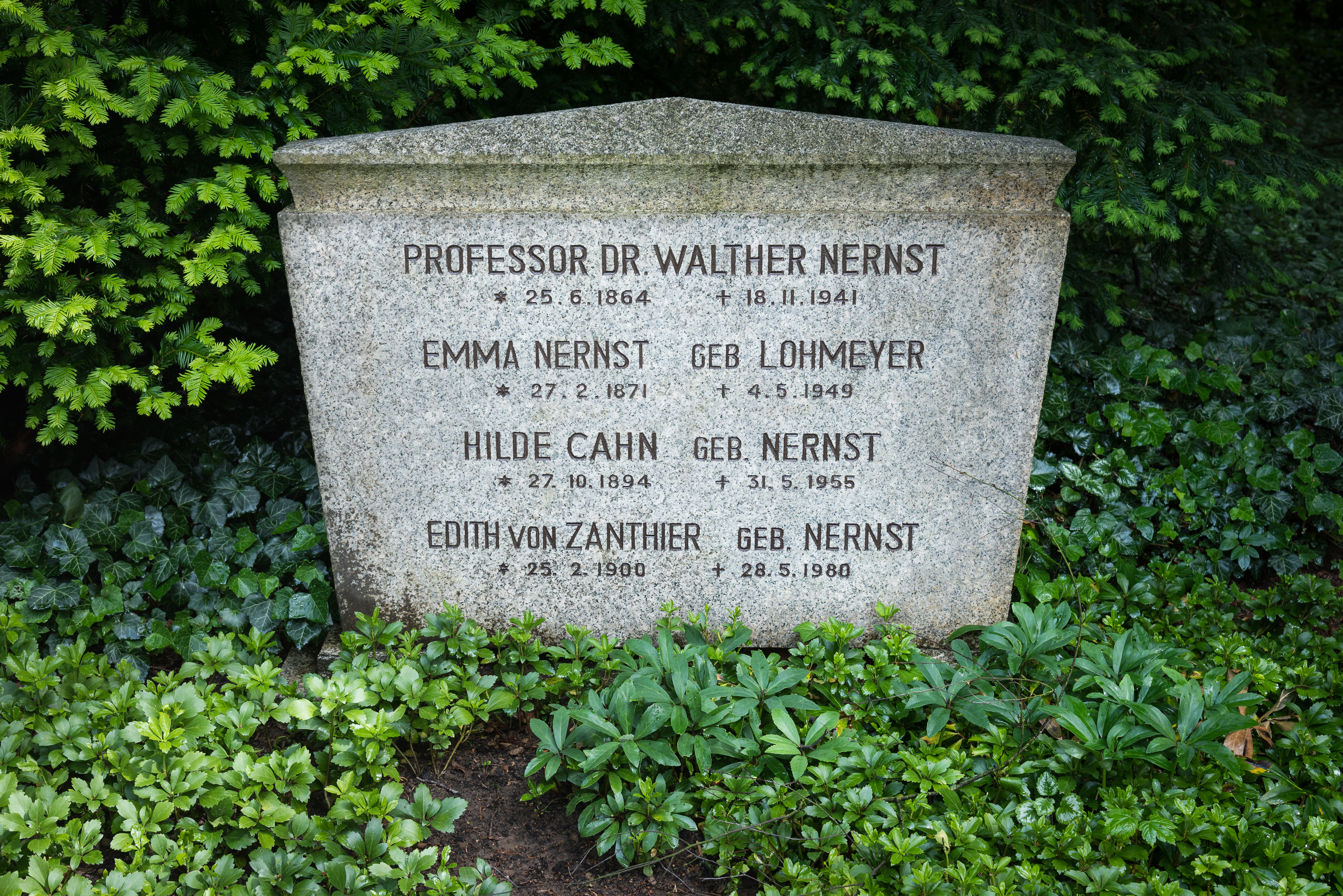
Walther Nernst

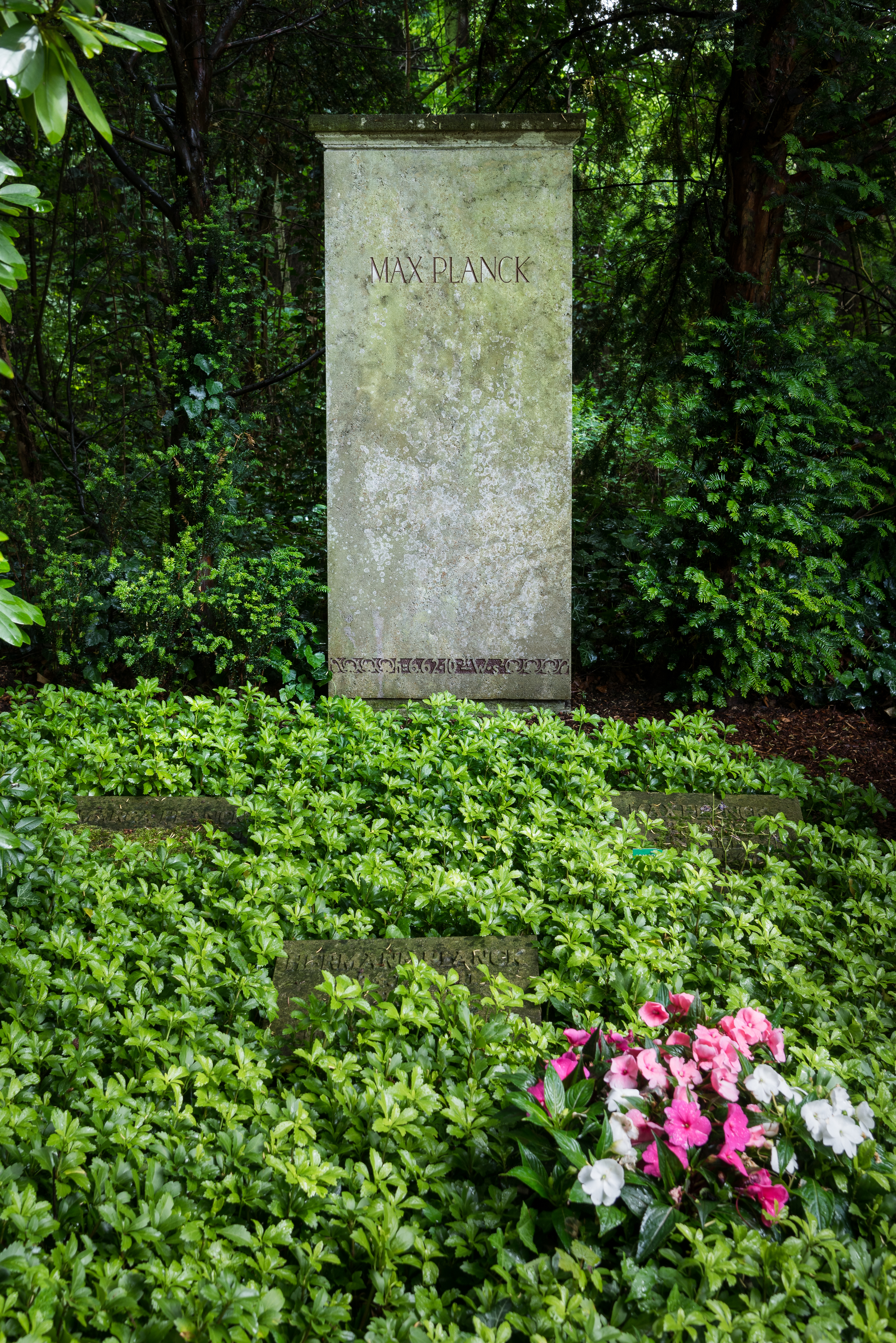
Max Planck

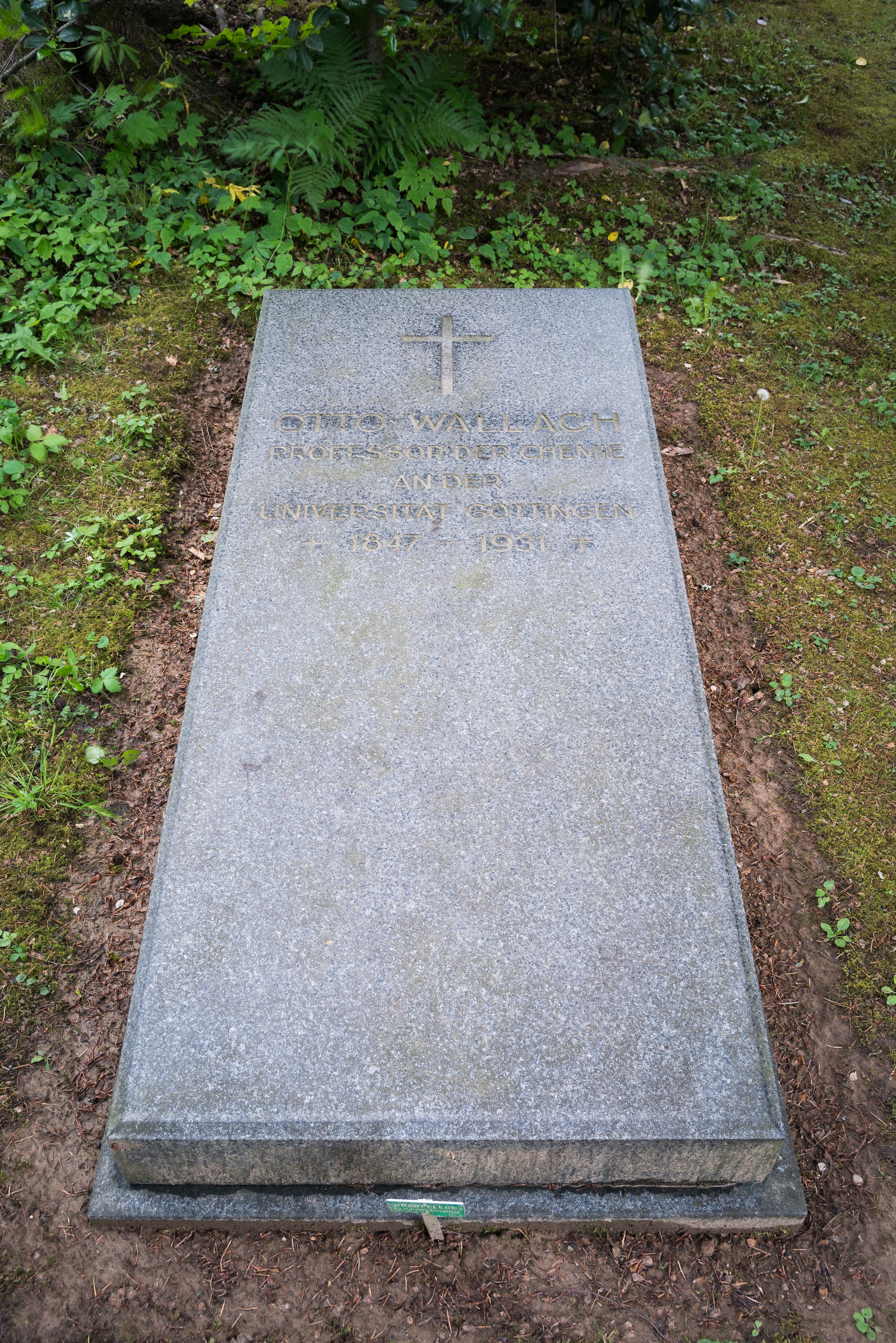
Otto Wallach

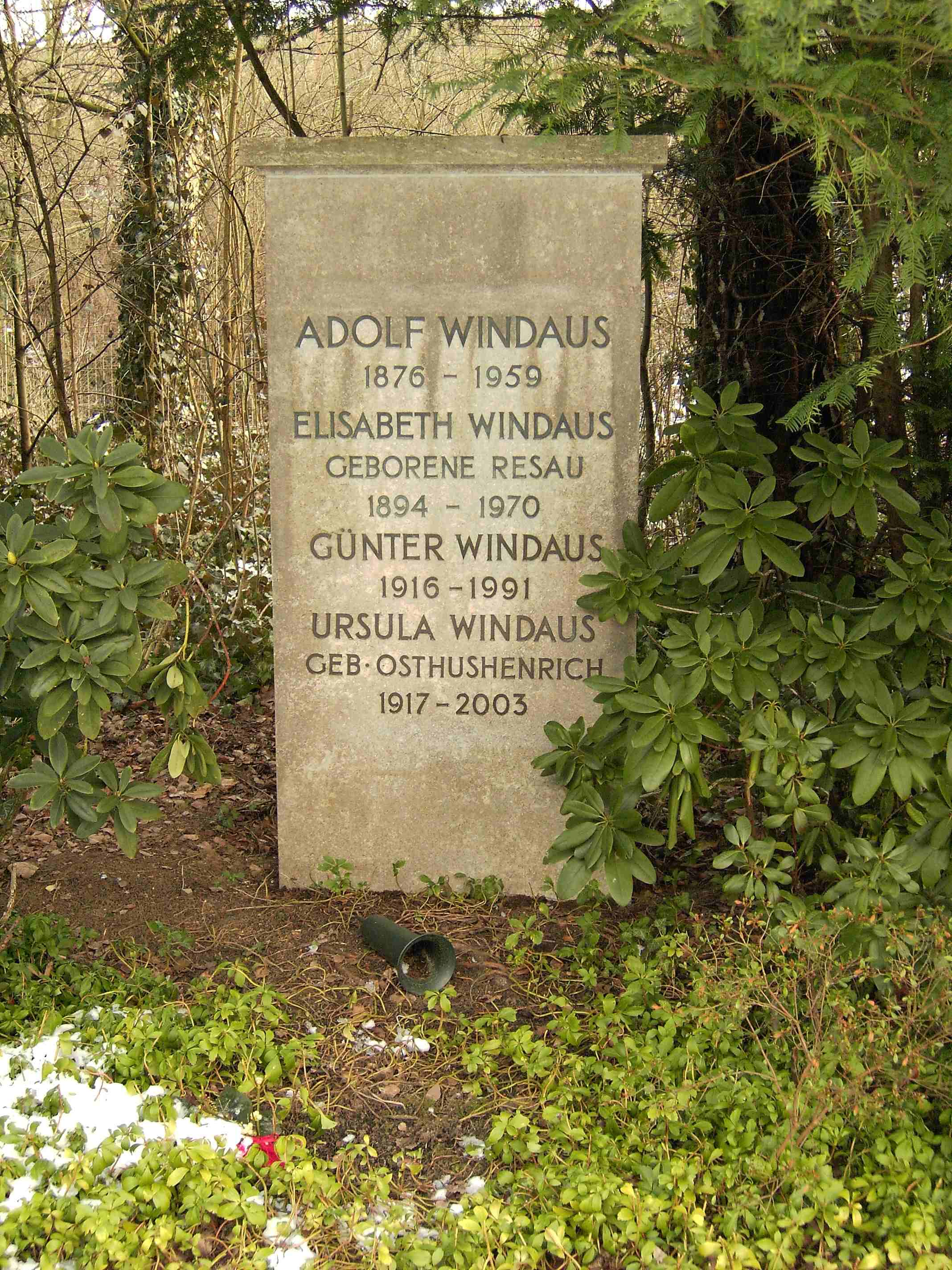
Adolf Windaus

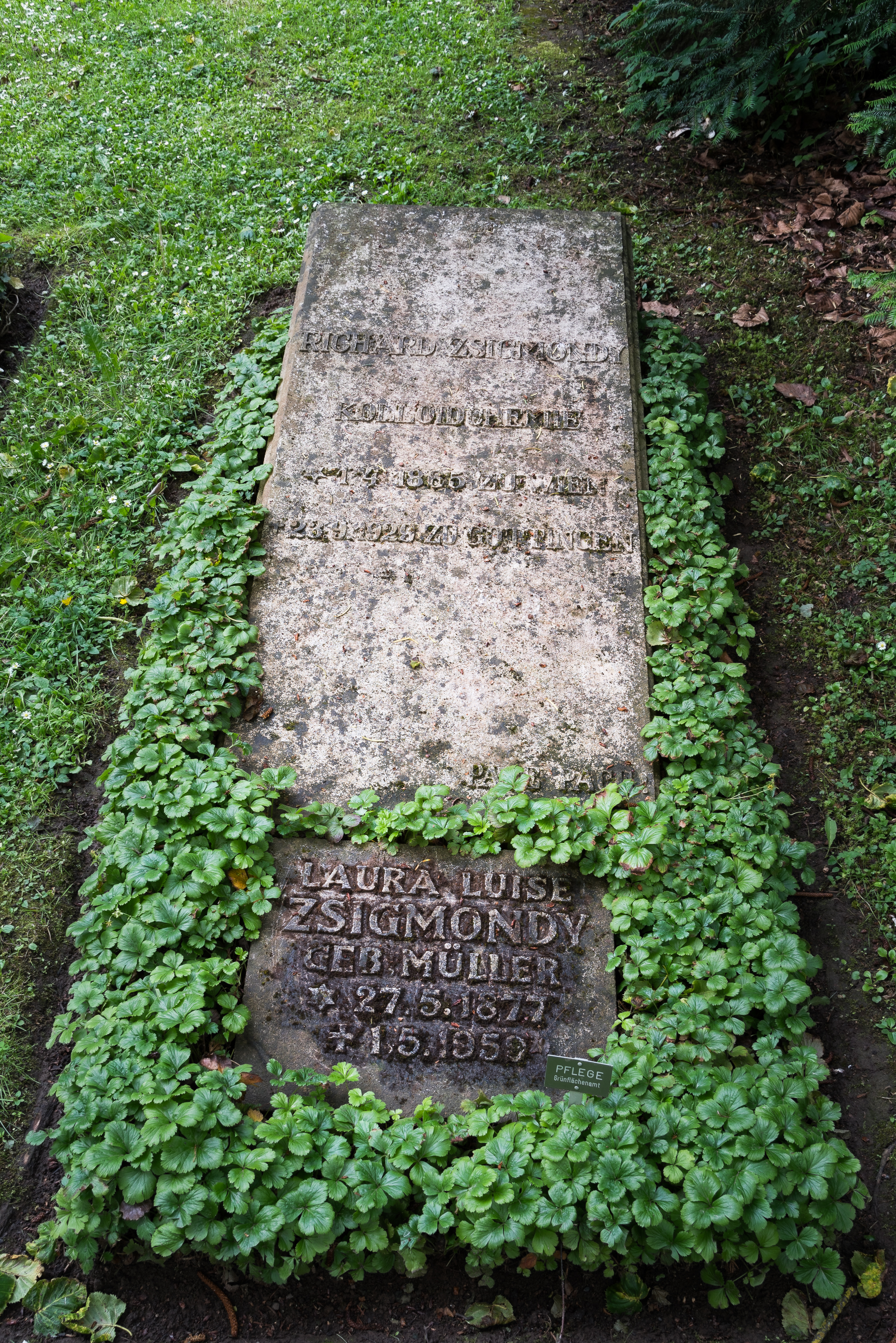
Richard Zsigmondy

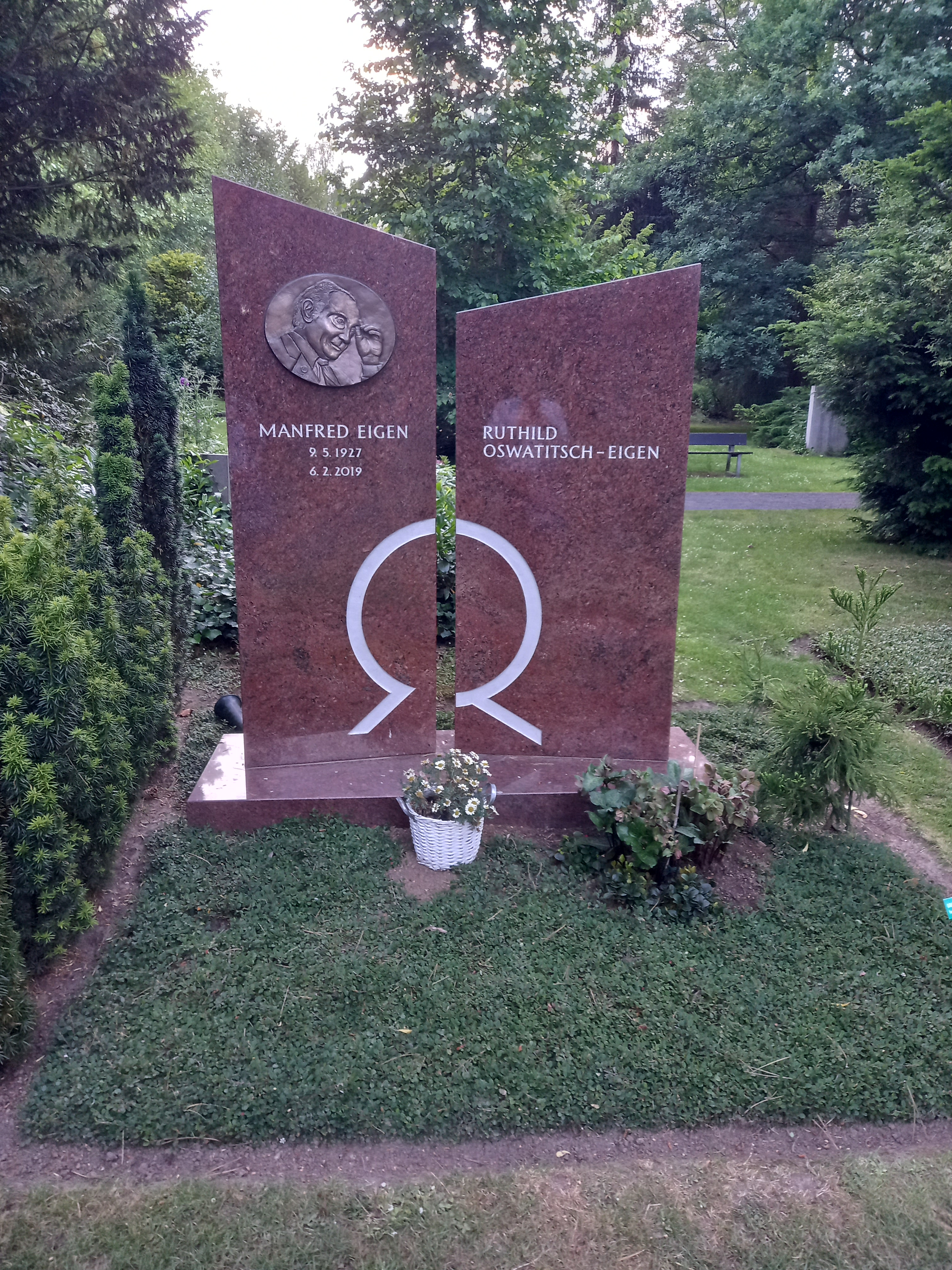
Manfred Eigen

Nine Nobel Prize winners are buried here:

- Max Born, Physics 1954
- Otto Hahn, Chemistry 1944
- Max von Laue, Physics 1914
- Walther Nernst, Chemistry 1920
- Max Planck, Physics 1918
- Otto Wallach, Chemistry 1910
- Adolf Windaus, Chemistry, 1928
- Richard Zsigmondy, Chemistry 1925
- Manfred Eigen, Chemistry 1967
Graves of Other Distinguished People
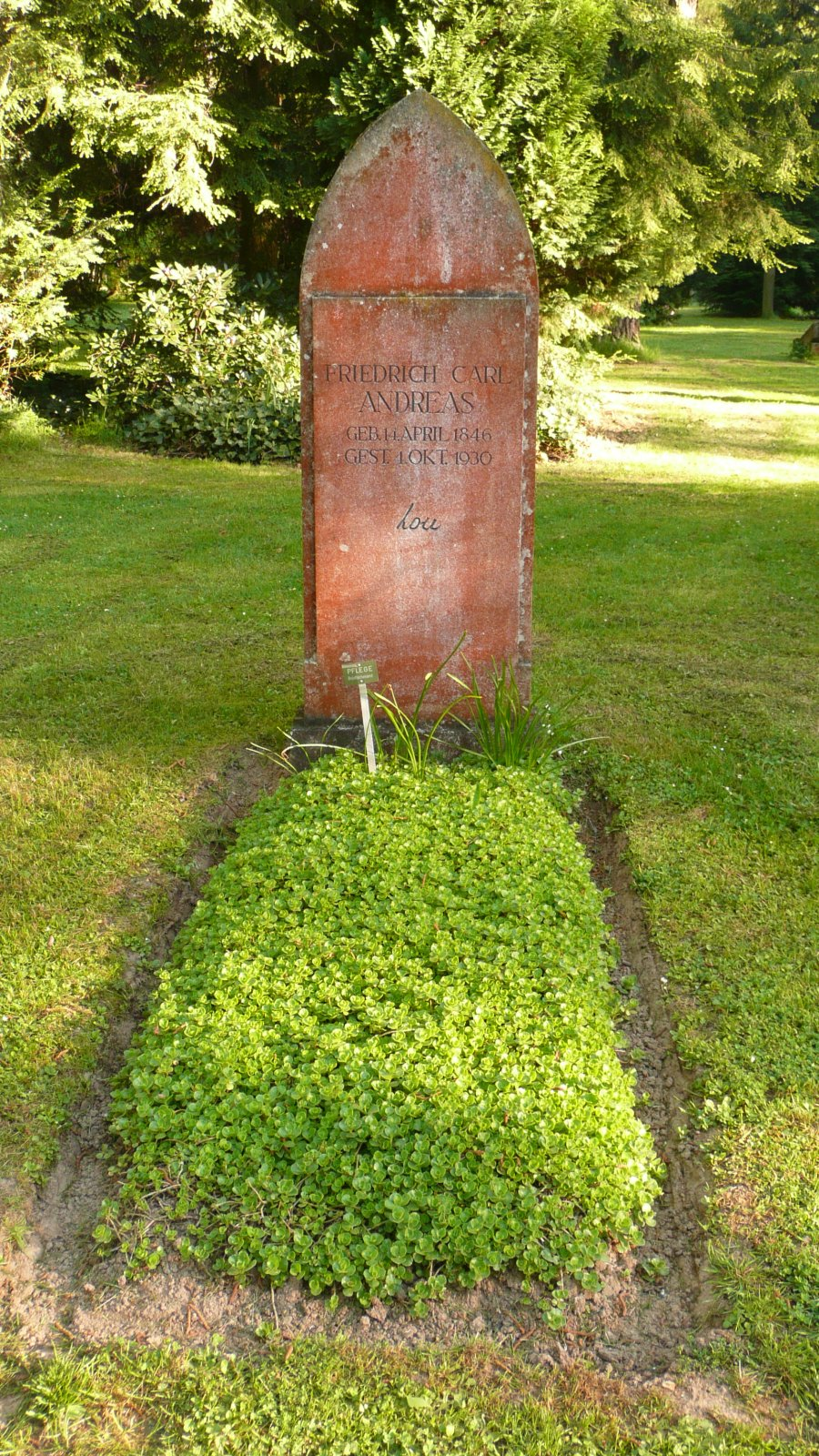
Friedrich Carl Andreas and Lou Andreas-Salomé

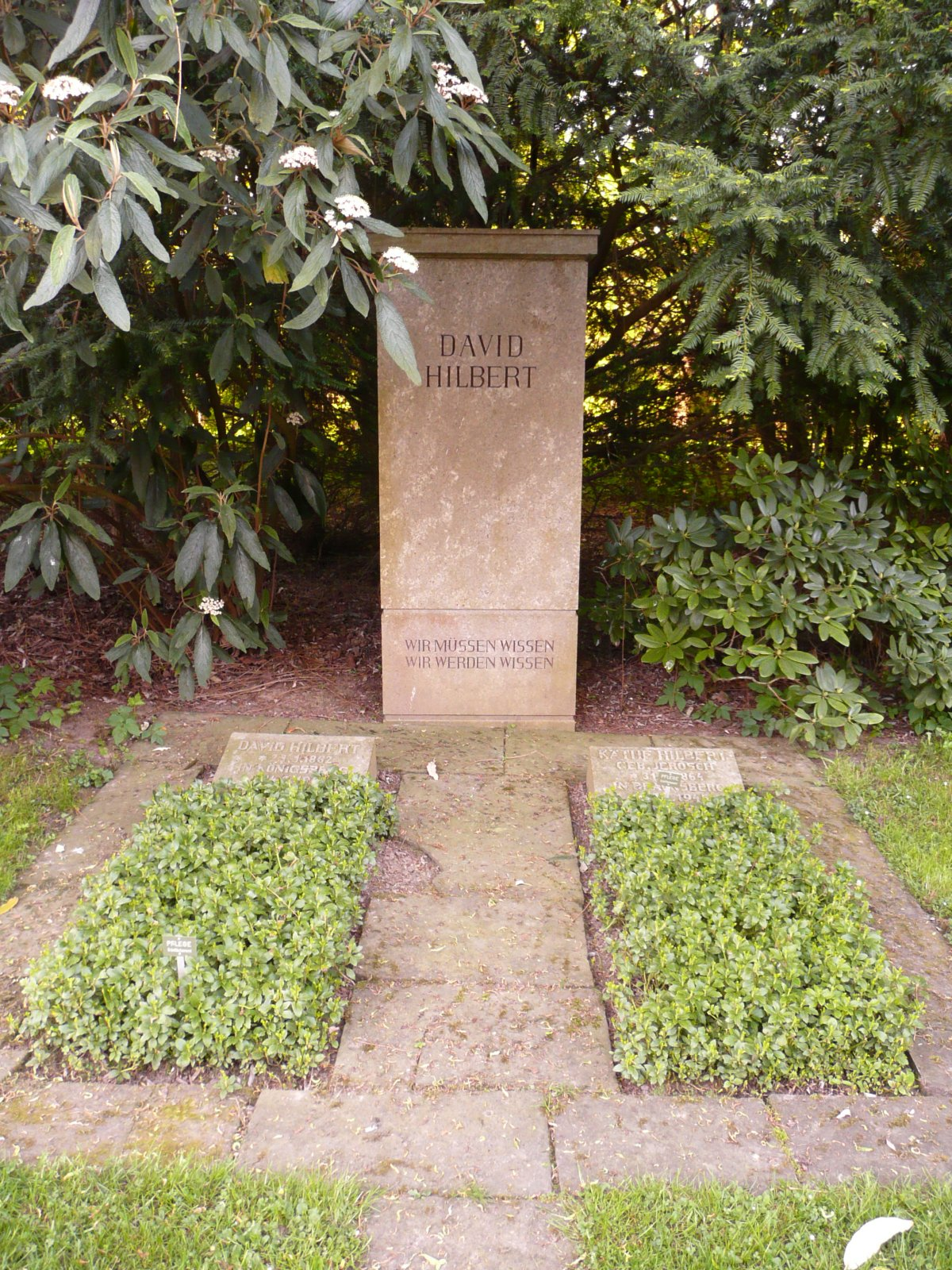
David Hilbert

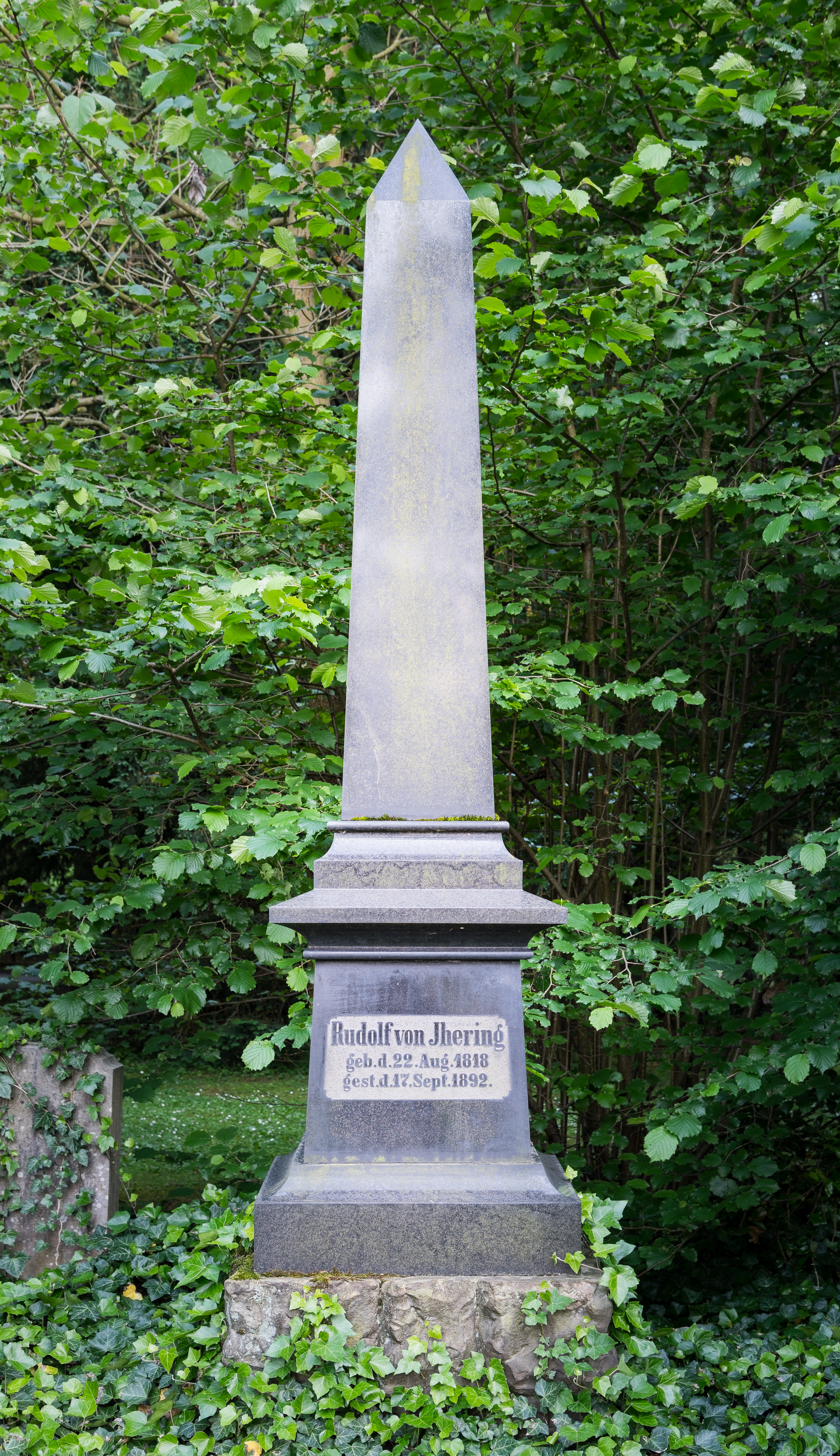
Rudolf von Jhering

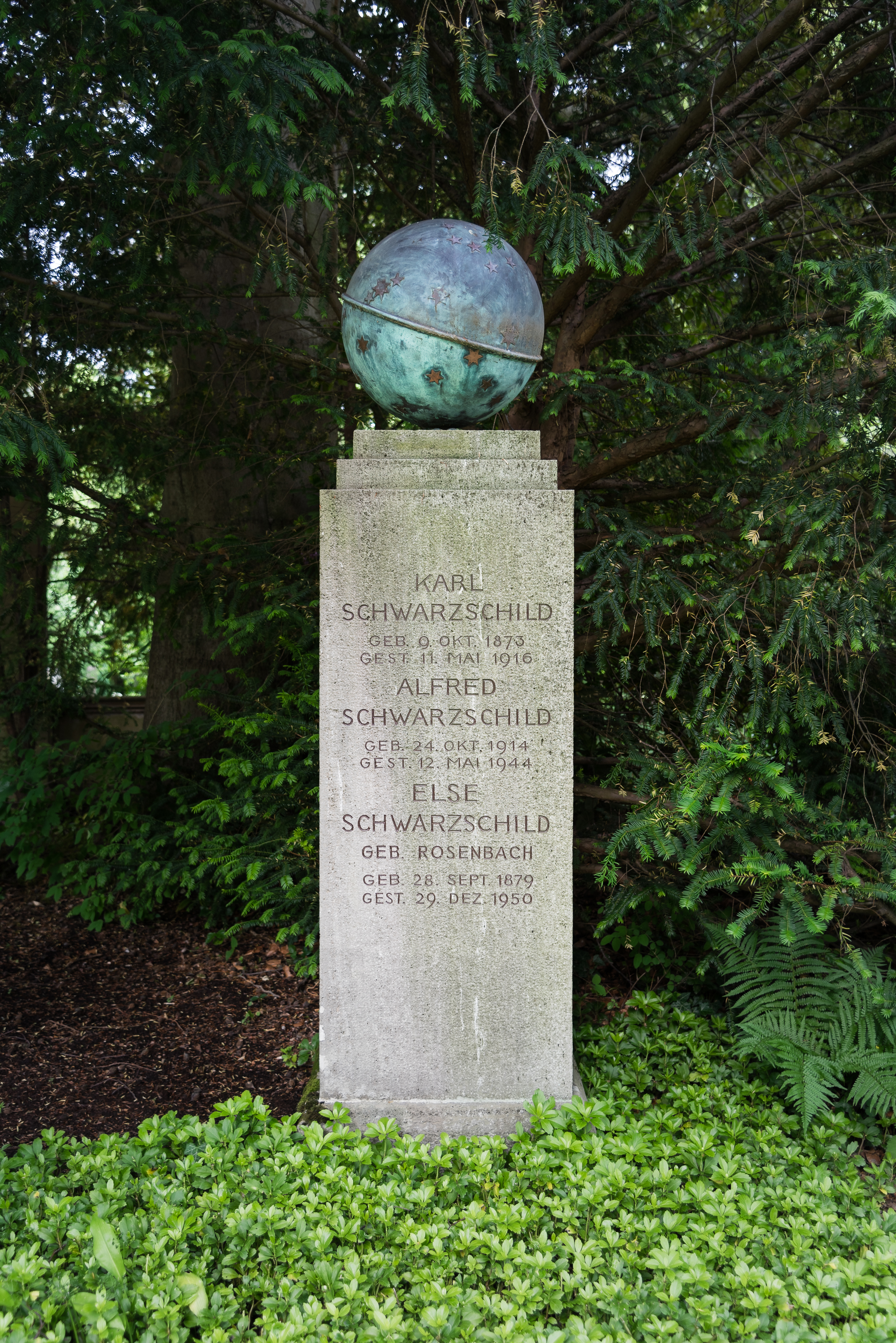
Karl Schwarzschild

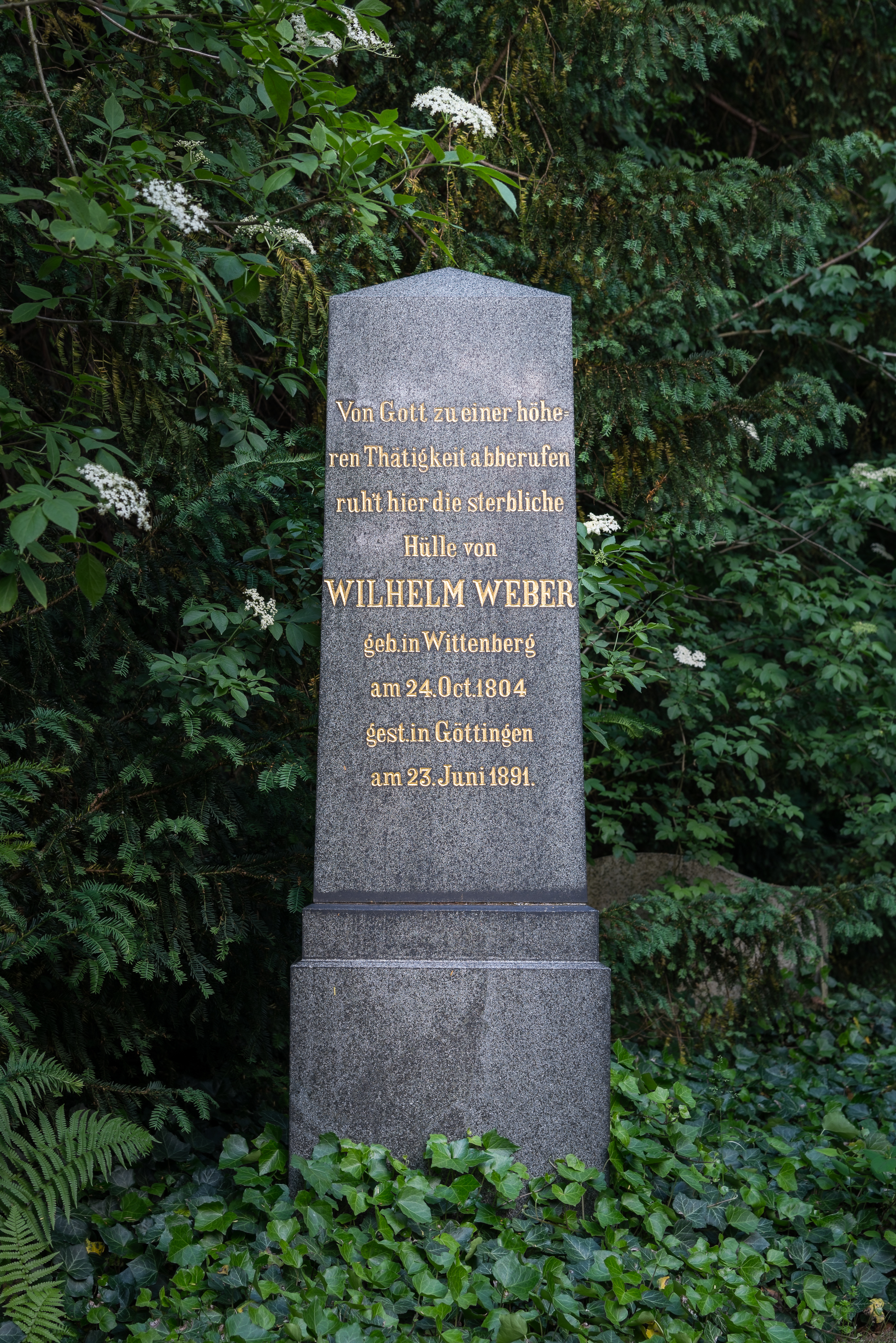
Wilhelm Weber

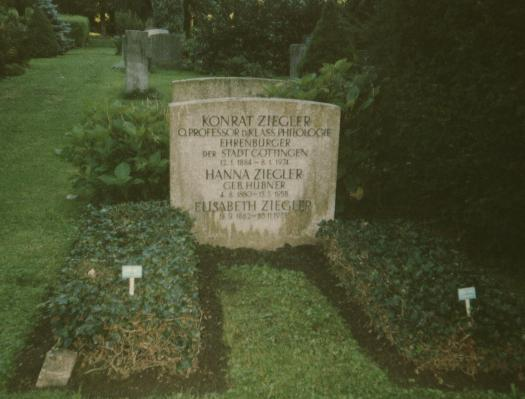
Konrat Ziegler

In addition, the city cemetery is also the final resting place of:

- Friedrich Carl Andreas, Iranist and orientalist
- Lou Andreas-Salomé, essayist and psychoanalyst
- George Frideric Calsow, politician, mayor of Göttingen
- Hermann Foege, lawyer and politician
- Gunter Hampel, jazz musician
- David Hilbert, mathematician
- Bruno Karl August Jung, Göttingen politician, mayor
- Gottfried Jungmichel, university teacher and politician
- Walter Meyerhoff, lawyer and politician
- Karl Schwarzschild, astronomer and physicist
- Wilhelm Eduard Weber, physicist
- Konrat Ziegler, classical scholar, Righteous Among the Nations

== See also ==
- List of famous cemeteries
