= Bombing of Göttingen =

Military actions during WWII

Bombing of Göttingen during World War II
- Part of Strategic bombing during World War II
| Date | 1944 - 1945 |
| Location | Göttingen |
| Result | 2.1% of the city destroyed, 107 deaths |

Belligerents
| United States | Germany |

Strength
| 8 bombing raids | |

The bombing of Göttingen were a series of British and American aerial bombing attacks on the city of Göttingen during World War II. A total of eight air raids were carried out by the Royal Air Force and United States Army Air Forces between 1944 and 1945 as part of the Allied campaign of strategic bombing of Germany. However, unlike nearby Kassel and Hanover, the city itself escaped major damage.

== Background ==
Unlike the nearby industrial hubs of Kassel and Hanover, Göttingen was not seen as a target of opportunity by the Allies until 1944, when the city appeared on a list of potential bombing targets for the RAF. Because the city was a historic University town, it had no important industry - only its location on the Hanover – Frankfurt railway line was important. The city also functioned as a regional railway junction. Other, smaller war-related industry present in Göttingen at the time were a marshaling yard, locomotive depot, Ausbesserungswerk or railway repair facility, the Lokhalle locomotive station, the military airbase of the Luftwaffe which had opened in the western part of the city in 1937 and the Aerodynamische Versuchsanstalt (AVA), which was located south of the city centre between the Brauweg and Bunsenstraße. The Reichsautobahn (today part of the A7), which passes close to Göttingen in the west, had also been completed before the outbreak of World War II, running north towards Nörten. In May 1939, the city had a total of 51,214 inhabitants.

== Attacks ==
While propaganda leaflets were dropped from Allied planes on Göttingen as early as May 24, 1940, actual attacks on the city did not happen until 1944. On June 13, 1943, the entire costume and furniture collection of the city theatre were stored in several locations throughout the city as a precaution against any possible future Allied air raid on Göttingen. In September that year, due to an increased danger of Allied aerial attacks, the Saint Jacob's Church (St. Jacobi Lutherkirche) and Saint Mary's Church (St. Marienkirche) moved their valuable Medieval Church altars to the Church located on the Nikolausberg. Previously, the altar of the Saint Albani Church (St. Albani-Kirche) had already been moved there.

The first British attack on Göttingen was planned for the night of 26 to 27 June 1944. The railway repair facility was chosen to be the target for 35 De Havilland Mosquito twin-engine fast bombers, but the planes did not find the city and accidentally dropped some of their payload on the nearby town of Reyershausen. The first actual air raid on the city occurred on July 7, 1944, when the American Eighth Air Force attacked the marshalling yard with 16 four-engine Boeing B-17 Flying Fortress heavy bombers. The attack ended up killing one civilian when around 200 high-explosive bombs hit a barrack in the western part of the city, as well as the Maschmühlenweg.

The second raid came on the evening of 23 November that year. The air raid was a disruptive attack by the British RAF. Six De Havilland Mosquito's carried out the attack on Göttingen, destroying the gasworks on the Maschmühlenweg as well as the barracks on today's Hiroshimaplatz after a hit from an aerial bomb. Houses at the Am Geismartor were also either damaged or the destroyed and the attack claimed nine lives. The next day, another disruptive RAF air raid happened. At 19:15, six De Havilland Mosquito's dropped bombs and forced the local population to take shelter in the bunkers. While the attack only killed one civilian, it caused considerable damage in the inner city. 18 out of 25 houses in the Untere-Masch-Straße were completely destroyed and houses on the Prinzenstraße and Paulinerstraße were also hit. Furthermore, a bomb fell on the Paulinerkirche, which was used as the Göttingen University library at the time. The bomb caused severe damage to the Church and surrounding buildings like the Commerzbank at the Prinzenhaus as well as a nursery in the Prinzenstraße, and a part of the book collection was permanently lost as a result. The neighbouring Kollegienhaus was completely destroyed, as well as the Prinzenhaus. Notable buildings who also suffered considerable damage were the Old Town Hall (Altes Rathaus) and Saint Johannis Church (St. Johanniskirche), as did the Luther School (Lutherschule). Another 2000 Pound bomb exploded over the Maschmühlenweg and Weender Tor, destroying houses and a petrol station in the process. As a result of the blast, shop windows in the Weender Straße and various other shopping streets shattered.

In 1945, attacks on Göttingen continued and intensified. As early as 1 January, a daytime American raid was carried out on the city. The Eighth Air Force sent out 26 B-17 Flying Fortress heavy bombers at around 13:00 from England to the marshalling yard, where they dropped time-fused bombs. The idea of dropping time-fused bombs was to slow down the general repair time of the Germans and to prevent quick repairs on any damaged vehicles in the immediate aftermath of the bombing - something the Germans were good at. The city mainly had light anti-aircraft guns stationed on the Brauweg, at the airfield and the railway station. In order to evade German air defence, the aircraft were flying at a lower altitude of 8000 meters. The raid claimed the lives of 47 civilians and destroyed the railway depot, as well as multiple houses on Emilienstraße, Arndtstraße, Weender Landstraße, Königsallee and Kasseler Landstraße. Many bombs hit the forced labour camp on the Schützenplatz, where 39 Russian forced labourers (including 9 children) lost their lives while celebrating the New Year. The surviving forced labourers were traumatized by the experience and were enraged by the Allied decision to use time-fused bombs and target the camp. A factory at Salinenweg 2 was almost completely destroyed and the auditorium of the Georg August University of Göttingen at the Weender Tor was also badly damaged. In the then independent village of Grone, a bomb hit and destroyed a house on the Lütjen Steinsweg, killing five people in total. In the western part of the city, the cemetery was hit, costing the lives of 7 Germans and 40 Russian prisoners of war. A second air raid took place over a month later, on the 9th of February. 15 B-17 Flying Fortress heavy bombers of the Eighth Air Force once again attacked the railroads. The train station of Göttingen and the air base west of the city were hit, but also residential buildings were damaged or destroyed. The aluminium plant on the Weender Landstraße suffered heavy damage and a total of 21 people were killed, ten of whom were forced labourers.

On February 22, the RAF and USAAF launched Operation Clarion. a large-scale campaign against German transport facilities, including rail stations, barges, docks, and bridges. The Göttingen railway facilities were also targeted by 29 American four-engine Consolidated B-24 Liberator heavy bombers. In order to frustrate the German air defence, the heavy bombers flew at a lower than usual altitude - 3000 meters. They also chose to select their targets visually. A total of 27 civilians lost their lives when the Göttingen railway station and facilities were bombed and the brewery on the Brauweg were also destroyed by bombs. The bombing was possibly aimed at the Aerodynamics Research Institute on the same road. Furthermore, Maschmühlenweg was hit and two houses on the Arndtstraße were also destroyed. The third air raid of 1945 happened on March 21, 1945. At 03:30, several high-explosive bombs fell on Göttingen, detonating with a timed delay. Four houses in the Jüdenstraße and Angerstraße were hit and the rear parts of the famous Junkernschänke and Rheinische Hof were also completely destroyed as a result. This raid claimed the life of Göttingen's city and university honorary citizen Börries Freiherr von Munchausen. A house in the Treuenhagen housing estate on the Am Markgraben street was destroyed as well after two bombs exploded - one on the street and one on the property. These small scale bombings were likely not a concentrated attack by the RAF however, but the result of a patrol mission of De Havilland Mosquitos.

On 1 April, another attack on the railway station and the airbase west of the city center took place when two American twin-engined Lockheed P-38 Lightning fighter bombers targeted the area's. However, during the raid, one of the fighter bombers was shot down by German anti-aircraft fire, killing the pilot. On the same day, concerned citizens and persons from the university attempted to declare Göttingen as a hospital and thus free city. This meant that the city would not be fought over by the Nazis and were to be surrendered to save the population from more bombing raids or close combat fighting inside the city, including around 2000 wounded civilians and also valuable facilities. During this period, serious conflicts arose with the Nazi Party authorities over this topic, but they eventually declared that defending the city would be tactically pointless.

On April 6, the Deutsches Heer officially cancelled the defence order for Göttingen, which meant that even during the retreat the German troops would not touch the city. By then, the city was fully cleared of military forces. Later in the evening spanning onto the next day, the last and heaviest Allied bombing on Göttingen occurred. The American Ninth Air Force attacked the railway facilities in Northeim and Göttingen with a total of 268 twin-engine light- and medium range bombers such as the Douglas A-20 Havoc, A-26 Invader and Martin B-26 Marauder. The bombers were used to support the advance of U.S. ground troops on the river Weser. The bombers approached from the south and attacked the reception building of the railway station, the Anatomical Institute of Göttingen's University and the upper floor of the Zoological Institute, destroying it completely in the process. Five people who sought shelter in the basement of the university's Anatomical Institute were killed and the bombing destroyed the railway bridge over the river Leine as well. The factory of Emil Mehle and several residential buildings on the eastern part of the Weender Landstraße were severely damaged. On the 7th of April, the Nazi-influenced local newspaper released its last publication.

The Americans decided to enter Göttingen on April 8. At 11:30 the alarm went off, signalling their approach. The first hits from artillery struck the city at 12:50 from the west, with intervals that lasted for about 10 minutes. The first shot hit the St. Paul's Church. At around 13:30, Nazi-appointed mayor Albert Gnade, city councillor Albert Otto Schwetge and district court councillor Erich Schmidt together with professor Baumgarten as interpreter, surrendered the city to the American troops standing on the market place.

== After the war ==
After the war ended for Göttingen and the city fell to the Americans, much happened in the first months after the war. The Nazi-appointed mayor was removed from office on 11 April and the local court judge Schmidt was appointed in his place. Strict curfews were initially imposed but later relaxed. Courts were also closed and radio, railway and postal services were suspended. English became the official language in the city. On April 17, the first streets named after National Socialist figures and units were renamed and on April 20 the local newspaper started publishing official announcements from the occupation and the German authorities. The Geismar Tor or Geismar Gate was destroyed by the American troops on April 21 because it was seen as a traffic obstacle. Between April and May, shops were gradually allowed to re-open their doors and telephone services also started to slowly resume their operations. On 1 June, Göttingen and the surrounding area were handed over by the Americans to the British forces and on 12 June, railway traffic resumed with a few passenger trains per day. German courts reopened on July 30 and in August, a College of the Rhine Army was established, for which university buildings in particular were confiscated. On August 4, the theater resumed operations on behalf of the British forces with Wolfgang Amadeus Mozart's The Marriage of Figaro and the first lectures were held again on September 17, with authorisation of the British military government. On 1 October, the university library and municipal museum were re-opened after the municipal library already opened a few months earlier. Over 10,000 refugees from the eastern parts of Germany which either left voluntarily or were forcibly relocated by the Soviet occupying force to give the land to nations like Communist Poland, settled in Göttingen on 1 October. This caused a great housing shortage and the subsequent forming of a city refugee office. In November the Medieval altars from the Saint Albani, Saint Jacob and Saint Mary churches were returned to their respective Churches, after being sheltered in the Nikolausberg for a few years. The first meeting of the new council appointed by the military government happened on 23 November. In December, the teaching establishments started operating again with the partial resumption of teaching at secondary schools. On December, 10, the gas supply resumed in the city after months of closure of the gasworks.

In the years following the conclusion of the war, many unexploded bombs that fell on the city were found. Many were successfully defused, but some exploded, killing and injuring a few people throughout the years. Some material damage was also caused by the controlled explosion of some duds.

== Destruction ==
After the war ended, reconstruction began in the areas that were hit. Houses and apartments that were damaged were restored or torn down and the destroyed buildings were cleared and rebuilt in the typical Traditionalist style of the 1950s. Churches and important buildings such as the Junkernschänke were restored to its original state, even if the latter was only restored as late as 1983 according to its historical model.

The air raids on Göttingen cost the lives of a total of 107 civilians. 300 houses were destroyed as well as 59 residential buildings. In total, 2.1% of the city ended up being destroyed and a total of 150.000 m^{3} of rubble was removed.

== Gallery ==
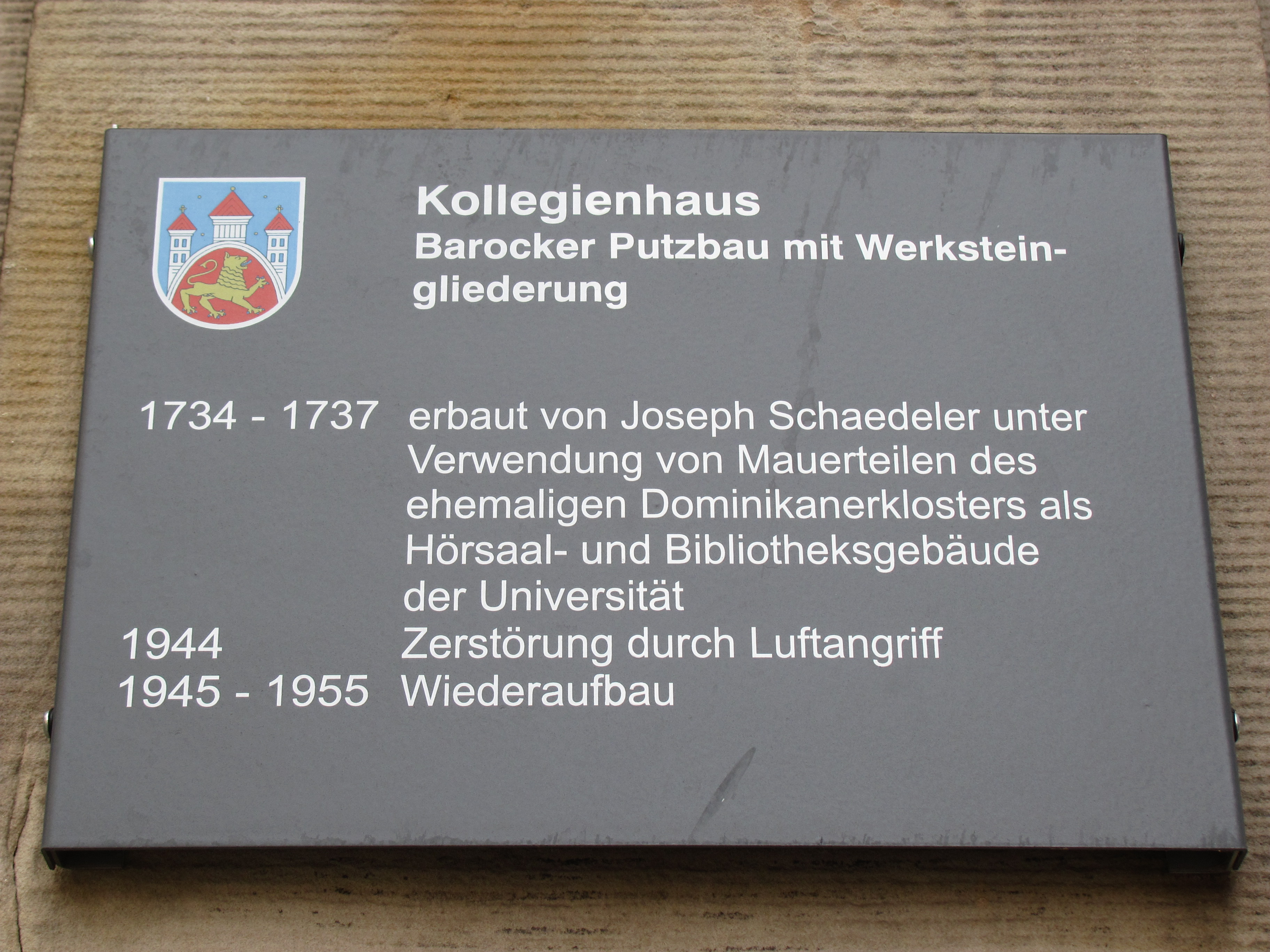
A conmemorative plaque on the Kollegien Building of the University of Göttingen. The plague mentions the destruction of the building in 1944.

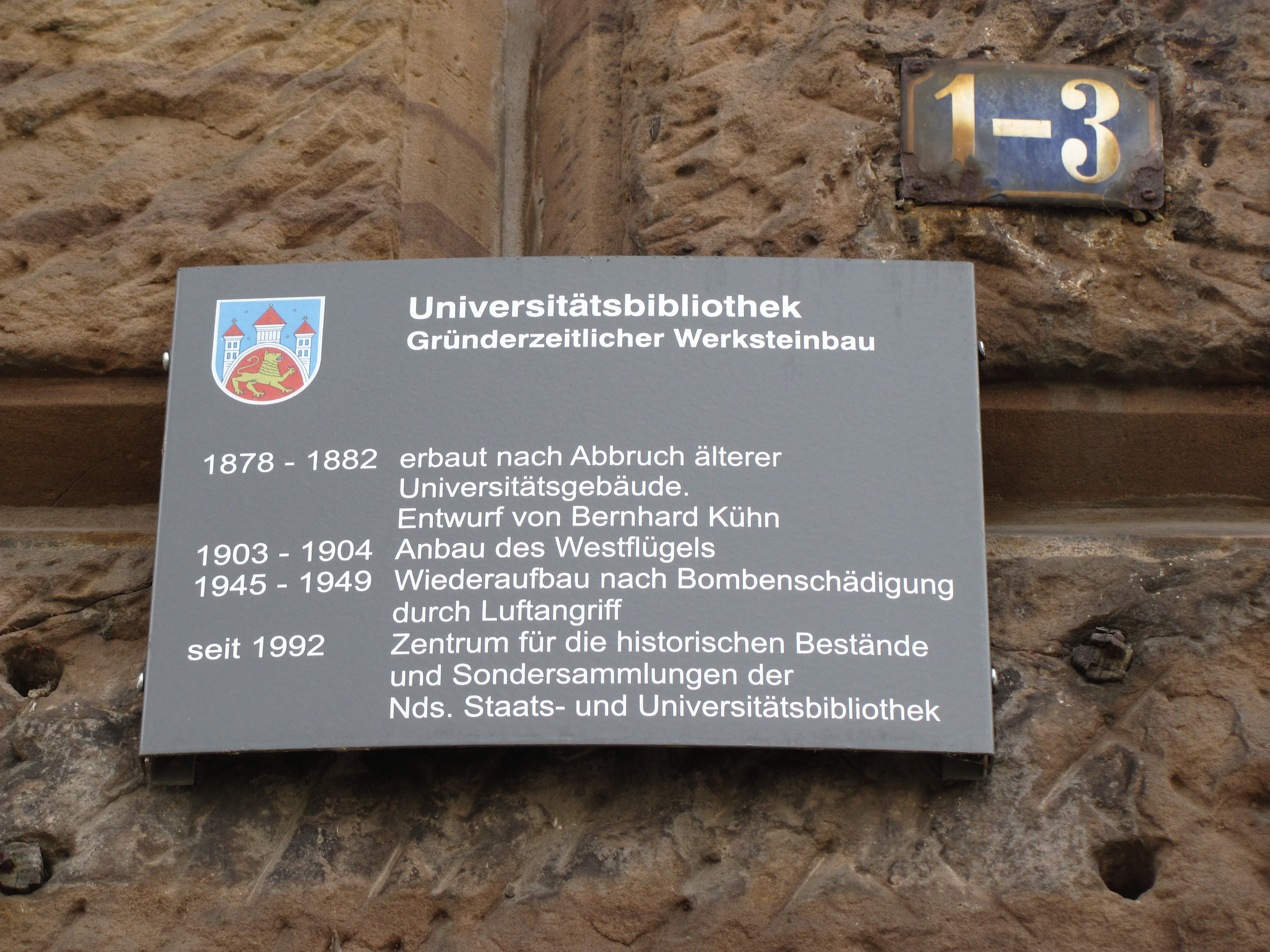
A conmemorative plaque on the library of the University of Göttingen. The plague mentions the rebuilding of the library in 1945 after its destruction.

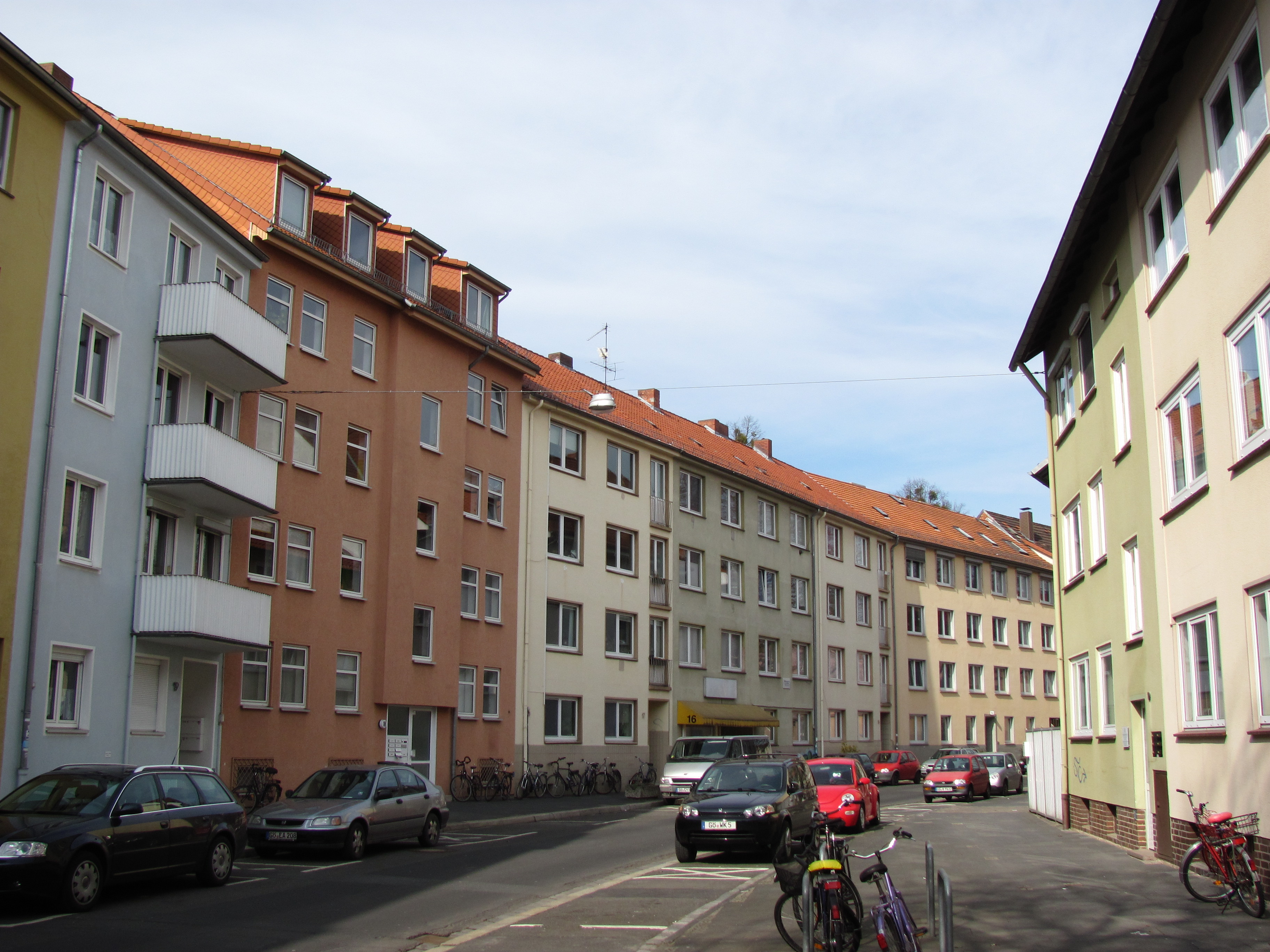
The Untere-Masch-Straße. The houses that were destroyed in the bombing raid of November 23, 1944 were rebuilt in the typical post-war style of the 1950s.

== See also ==
- Strategic bombing during World War II
- Bombing of Kassel in World War II
- Bombing of Hanover in World War II
