= Theodore H. Von Laue =

American historian (1916–2000)

Theodore H. Von Laue (June 22, 1916 in Frankfurt, Germany – January 22, 2000 in Worcester, Massachusetts) was an American historian and professor emeritus of history at Clark University. He was a winner of Guggenheim Fellowship (1962 and 1974).

After having studied at the University of Freiburg, Germany, in 1937 Von Laue was sent to Princeton University by his father Max von Laue, who did not want him to grow up "in a country run by gangsters". He finished his studies with a PhD about the social legislation of Otto von Bismarck. He then taught at Swarthmore College, the University of California, Riverside, and the Washington University in St. Louis, until he finally became professor of European History at Clark University in Worcester, Massachusetts. He was there from 1970 until his retirement in 1982. In his obituary he is described as modest and witty. Not many knew that he was a Quaker, co-initiated the anti-war-movement at Washington University in St. Louis and joined Martin Luther King Jr. in the Selma to Montgomery marches.

One of Von Laue's first published works was a biographical study of Leopold von Ranke arguing that his "scientific objectivity" was much influenced by the Romantic movement of the 19th century. He then switched to studies of German and especially Russian history, which led him to consider the influence of "western civilization," which he more or less equated with modernization in some ways, on other countries. For example, his book about Sergei Witte focuses on his failure to industrialize Russia, blocked by conservative forces including the last Russian tsar Nicholas II. Better known are the following books on the same topic: Why Lenin? Why Stalin? published in 1964, expanded to Why Lenin? Why Stalin? Why Gorbachev? in 1993, and finally his The World Revolution of Westernization, published in 1987, which, according to an obituary by William H. McNeill, a historian from the University of Chicago, was "a fine and wise book — wise in a way few books are." A recension of his book The Global City in 1969 shows that he expected a global confluence, dominated by the West, with problems lasting beyond the 20th century.

Von Laue's view in 1994 of world history was presented in a paper at the conference of the New England Regional World History Association in Bentley College, Waltham, MA, USA, on April 23, 1994, and can be summarized in the following points:

1. The western civilization is present worldwide and its essential elements are dominant almost everywhere. (1. phrase in ch. VI.)

2. Other civilizations have problems to this cultural adaptation; resistance to it, cultural disorientation show up; political instability may lead to dictatorship. (3rd paragraph in ch. VI.)

3. Two contradicting movements arise: a. violent resistance against the foreign influence, and b. the need to use a lot of western elements to improve life conditions by using them peacefully. (6th paragraph in ch. VII.)

4. On top of these worldwide problems are the topics of population growth, resources of raw materials, ecology, and climate. (7th paragraph in ch. VII.)
