= Heinrich Gerber (architect) =

German architect

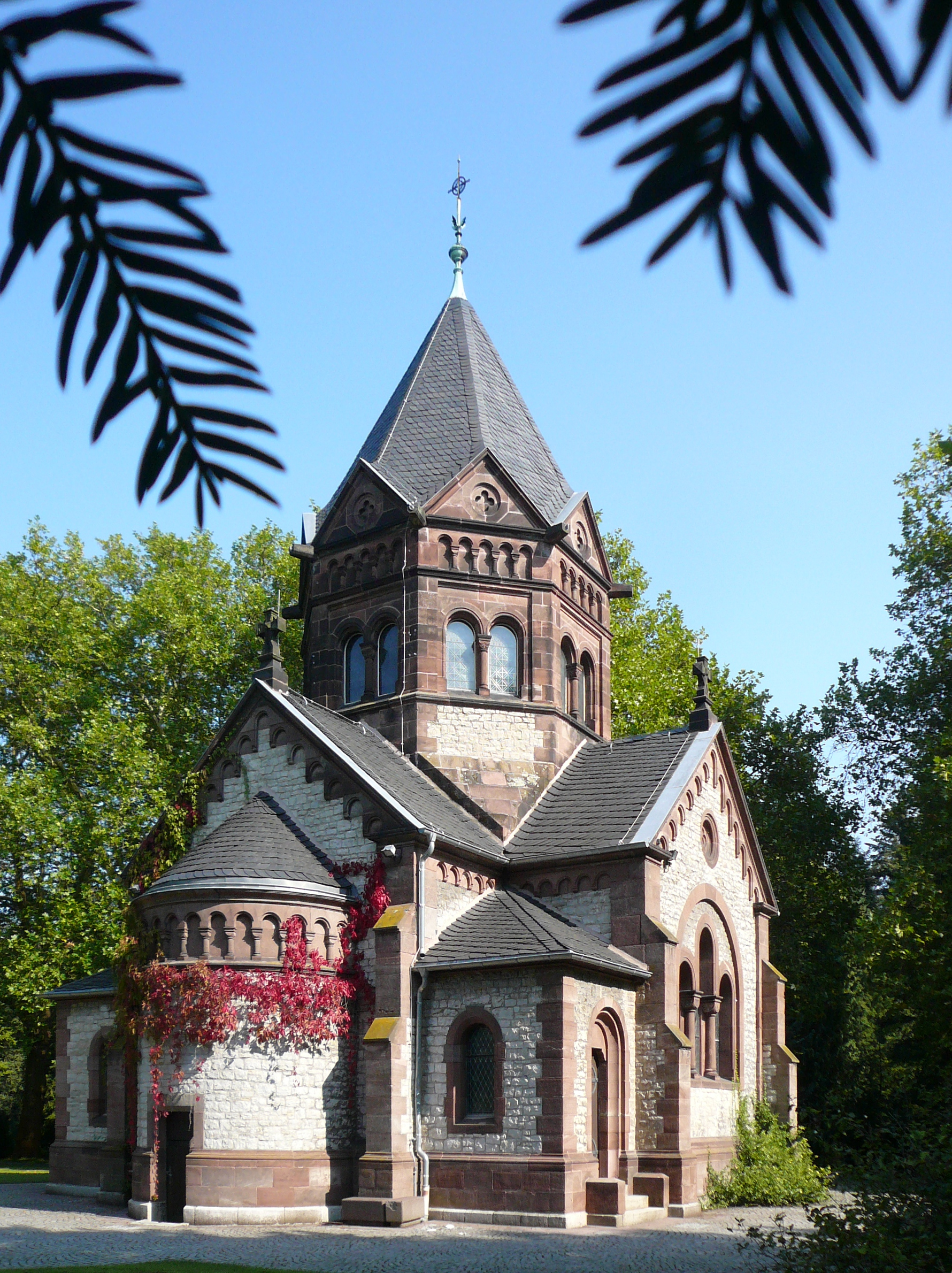
Chapel at the Stadtfriedhof

Heinrich August Anton Gerber (23 August 1831 – 28 February 1920) was a German architect.

== Life and work ==
From 1847 to 1852, he studied at the Technical University of Hanover with Conrad Wilhelm Hase. After graduating, he briefly worked in the university's architecture office. Between 1853 and 1857, he did work at St. Martin's Church in Linden, and was site manager for the railway station at Hannoversch-Münden.

After that, he worked abroad. This included a project in Paris, with Jacques Ignace Hittorff, involving a redesign of the Place de la Concorde. He also worked in Brazil, where he was the Chief Engineer for the province of Minas Gerais. There, in addition to numerous civil engineering works, he helped create a new provincial map and designed a theatre for Ouro Preto. For his work there, Emperor Pedro II awarded him the Knight's Cross of the Order of the Rose.

Upon returning to Germany, he initially worked for the Royal Hanoverian State Railways, but the largest part of his career, from 1896 to 1901, was spent as a construction officer with the Building Department in Göttingen. From 1898, he was in charge of civil engineering. In addition to his work for the city, he assisted with projects in other cities throughout Lower Saxony and, with official permission, worked on some private projects. During the latter part of his time there, he was involved in urban planning and infrastructure.

He retired in 1901, due to unspecified health issues. Shortly after, he received the Order of the Crown from Kaiser Wilhelm II. A street in Göttingen is named after him.

His most notable buildings include: a villa for the lawyer, Carl Ludwig von Bar, who served on the Hague Tribunal; the cemetery chapel at the Stadtfriedhof in Göttingen; cadet housing for the Corps Saxonia Göttingen; and an observation tower known as the Bismarckturm.
