= NeuroQuantology =

- Discipline: Neuroscience, quantum mechanics
- Language: English
- Edited by: Riyaz Ahmed abdul Khan

Publication details
- History: 2003-present
- Publisher: AnKa Publisher
- Frequency: Monthly
- Impact factor: 0.453 (2017)

Standard abbreviations
- ISO 4: NeuroQuantology

Indexing
- ISSN: 1303-5150

Links
- Journal homepage; Online archive

NeuroQuantology is a monthly peer-reviewed interdisciplinary scientific journal meant to cover the intersection of neuroscience and quantum mechanics. It was established in April 2003 and its subject matter almost immediately dismissed in The Lancet Neurology as "wild invention" and "claptrap". According to the Journal Citation Reports, the journal had a 2017 impact factor of 0.453, ranking it 253rd out of 261 journals in the category "Neuroscience". However, the journal has been delisted since the 2019 edition. The journal describes itself as focusing primarily on original reports of experimental and theoretical research. It also publishes literature reviews, methodological articles, empirical findings, book reviews, news, comments, letters to the editor, and abstracts. The founding editor-in-chief is Sultan Tarlacı, who was succeeded by Riyaz Ahmed abdul Khan.

In the Norwegian Scientific Index, the journal has been listed as "Level 0" since 2008, which means that it is not considered scientific and publications in the journal therefore do not fulfill the necessary criteria in order to count for public research funding.

According to Sadri Hassani, neither the editorial board nor the advisory board contain scientists working in the fields of quantum physics or neuroscience.

The journal is abstracted and indexed in Embase and in Scopus from 2007 till 2022 when it was delisted due to "publication concerns".
