= Halbleiterwerk Frankfurt (Oder) =

East Germany's largest manufacturer of semiconductor devices

- Type: VEB; GmbH
- Industry: Semiconductors
- Founded: January 1, 1959; 67 years ago
- Defunct: 1992
- Headquarters: Frankfurt (Oder), Germany
- Number of employees: 8200 (1989)

VEB Halbleiterwerk Frankfurt (Oder) (abbreviated HFO or HWF) was the largest manufacturer of semiconductor devices in the German Democratic Republic. In 1989, HFO produced 110 million integrated circuits (70% of all integrated circuits produced in the GDR in that year), 9.7 million transistors, and 150 million transistor chips. Despite this, HFO did not rise to prominence like Zentrum Mikroelektronik Dresden (of megabit chip fame) or VEB Mikroelektronik "Karl Marx" Erfurt (known for its microprocessors). Also unlike Zentrum Mikroelektronik Dresden and VEB Mikroelektronik "Karl Marx" Erfurt, HFO did not survive long after German Reunification.

== History ==
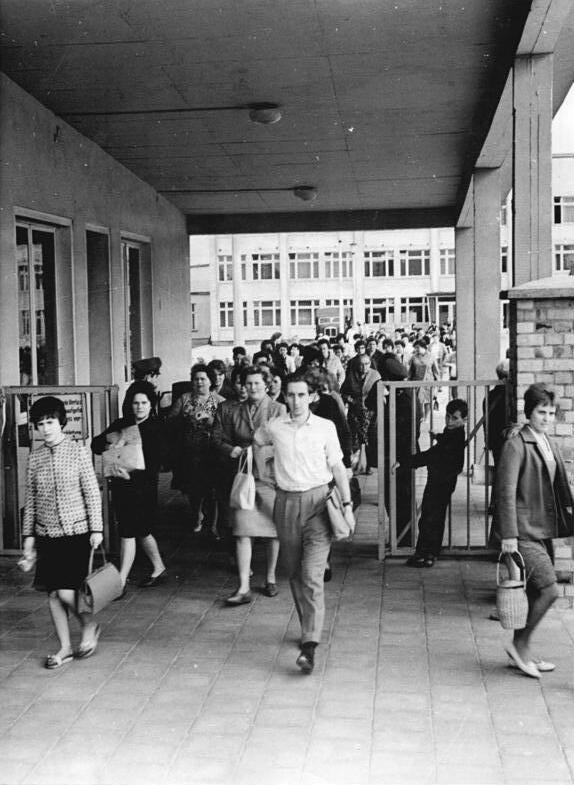
Shift change at the main gate of Halbleiterwerk Frankfurt (Oder), 1964

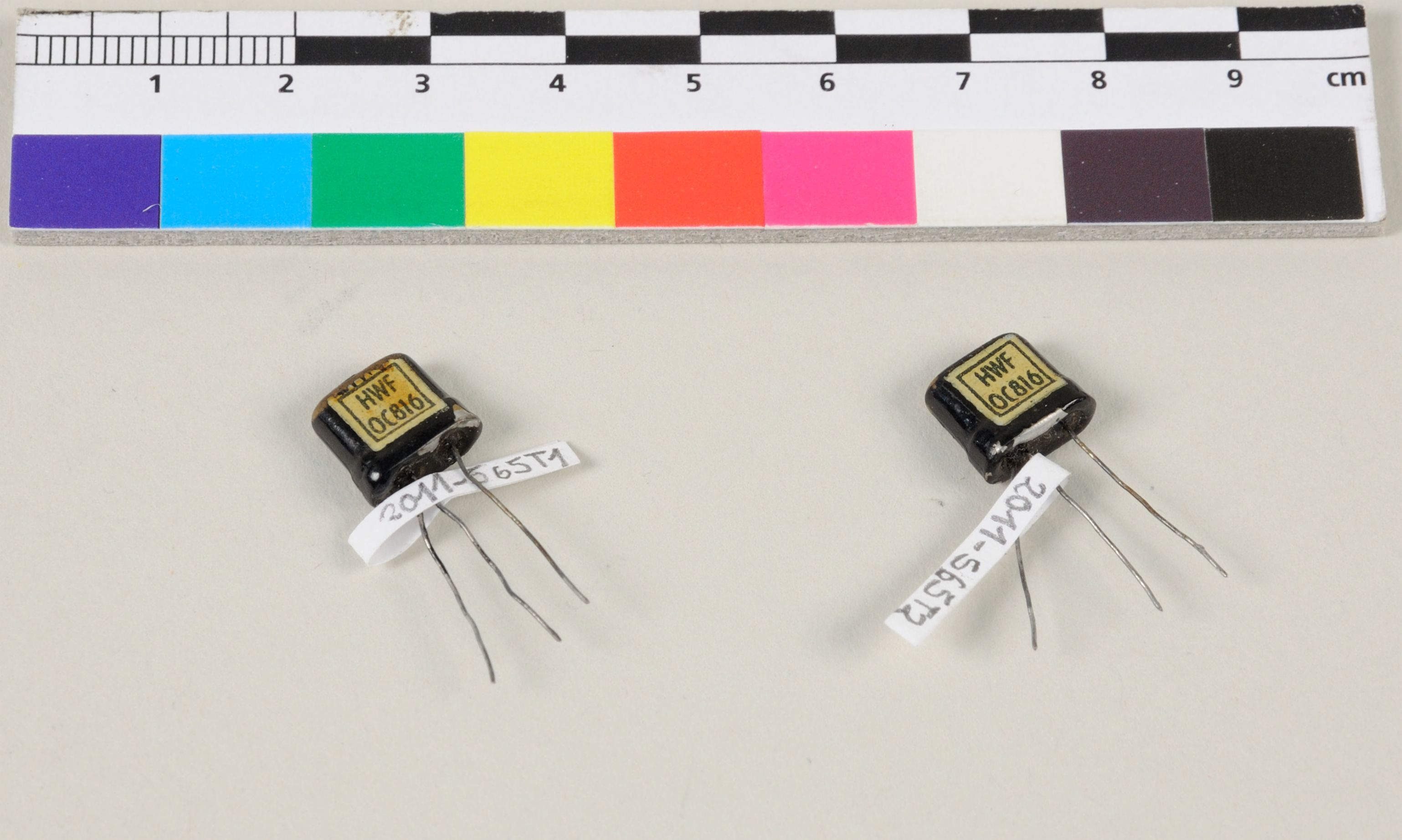
Germanium alloy-junction transistors OC816 (1961; in Deutsches Museum)

In January 1958, the production of germanium diodes started in the building of a former vocational school. Halbleiterwerk Frankfurt (Oder) was officially founded on 1 January 1959. In January 1961 new production facilities for germanium alloy-junction transistors and diodes went into operation in the Markendorf quarter of Frankfurt (Oder). The development of germanium transistors continued with drift transistors in 1963 and mesa transistors in 1966. First silicon planar transistors followed in 1967. The production of germanium devices was discontinued in 1977.

The age of integrated circuits began for HFO in 1971 with the mass production of 7400 series digital circuits that had been developed by Arbeitsstelle für Molekularelektronik Dresden. The first linear integrated circuits were introduced at the Leipzig Spring Fair a year later: the A109C (a clone of the Fairchild μA709) and the A110C (a clone of the Fairchild μA710). Starting in 1974, lower-cost plastic packages began to replace the initially used ceramic packages for integrated circuits. In order to reduce production costs the wafer size was increased from 25 mm in 1961 to 36 mm in 1967, 51 mm in 1976, 76 mm in 1978, and 100 mm in 1986. Due to CoCom restrictions and the scarcity of convertible currency in the East German economy, semiconductor manufacturing equipment could not be bought in the West. HFO resorted to building some of the equipment themselves, such as a chip sorter that automatically measured circuit parameters at different temperatures (Uni-Sorter 6202) or a wafer test system (SSM100).

In 1978, HFO became a part of Kombinat Mikroelektronik Erfurt.

=== After 1990 ===
VEB Halbleiterwerk was succeeded, in turn, by Halbleiterwerk GmbH, System Microelectronic Innovation GmbH (SMI), Silicon Microelectronic Integration GmbH (SiMI), Megaxess GmbH Deutschland, and Microtechnology Services Frankfurt (Oder) GmbH (MSF), each with less employees than its predecessor. The website of MSF disappeared around 2009. Construction on a new semiconductor plant, Communicant Semiconductor Technologies, had started already but this endeavour collapsed in 2003. Only IHP, the research institute that had supported VEB Halbleiterwerk, remained after that.

== Products ==
The scarcity of convertible currency in the East German economy prompted the country to manufacture as many products as possible domestically. For HFO this resulted in an unusually broad spectrum of integrated circuits for a manufacturer its size. In 1987 HFO manufactured about 300 different basic types of integrated circuits (i.e. excluding variants selected based on certain parameters). This meant that many production runs were small and economies of scale could not be achieved. HFO was the sole producer of bipolar integrated circuits in East Germany. The product range included:

- TTL circuits: D1xx, D2xx, DLxxx, and DSxxx series (equivalent to the 74, 74H, 74LS, and 74S series)
- HTL circuits: D410D, E412D, E435E
- linear integrated circuits for consumer and industrial applications (e.g. B555, B3170)
- low-power transistors and transistor arrays
- transistor chips (to be packaged into finished transistors at VEB Mikroelektronik "Anna Seghers" Neuhaus am Rennweg)
- Hall-effect sensors
- mixed-signal integrated circuits (analogue-to-digital converters and digital-to-analogue converters)
- custom and semi-custom application-specific integrated circuits, especially for telecommunications, including high-voltage devices (90 V)

In addition to the bipolar devices, a production line for CMOS integrated circuits for pocket calculators was added in 1982.

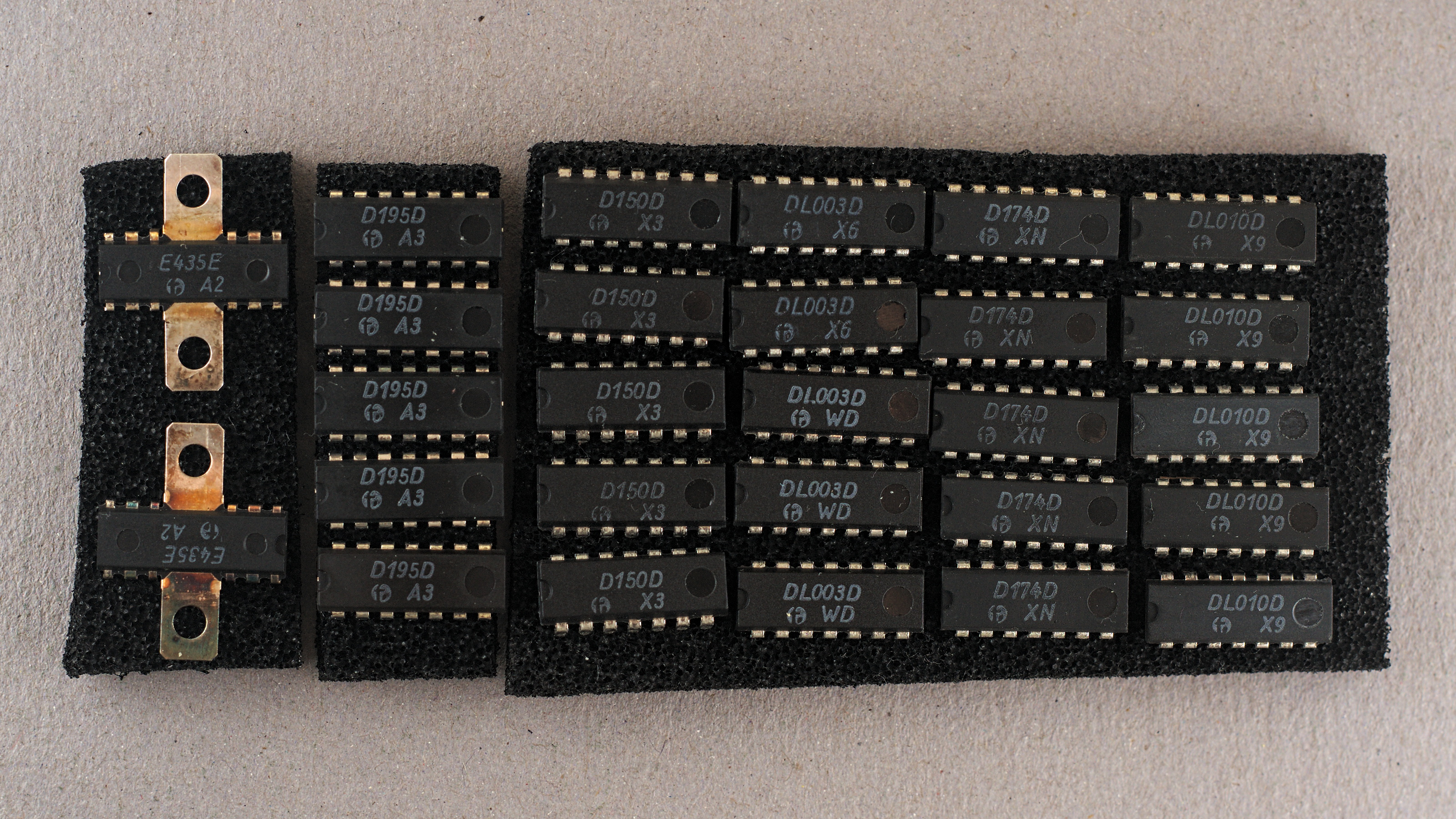
Digital integrated circuits (HTL, 74 and 74LS series; manufactured 1988–1990)

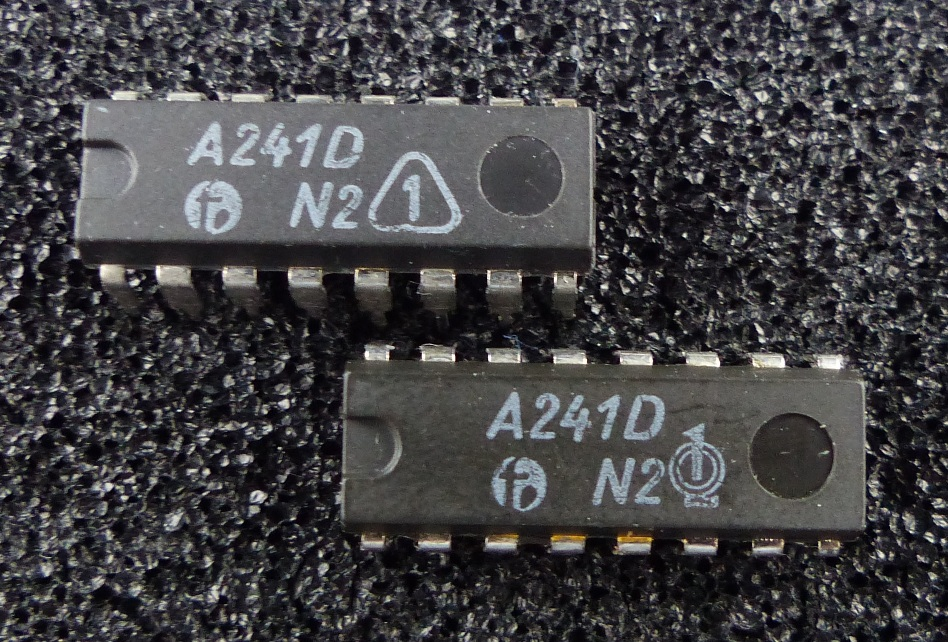
Linear integrated circuits (with quality marking^{[de]}; manufactured 1981)

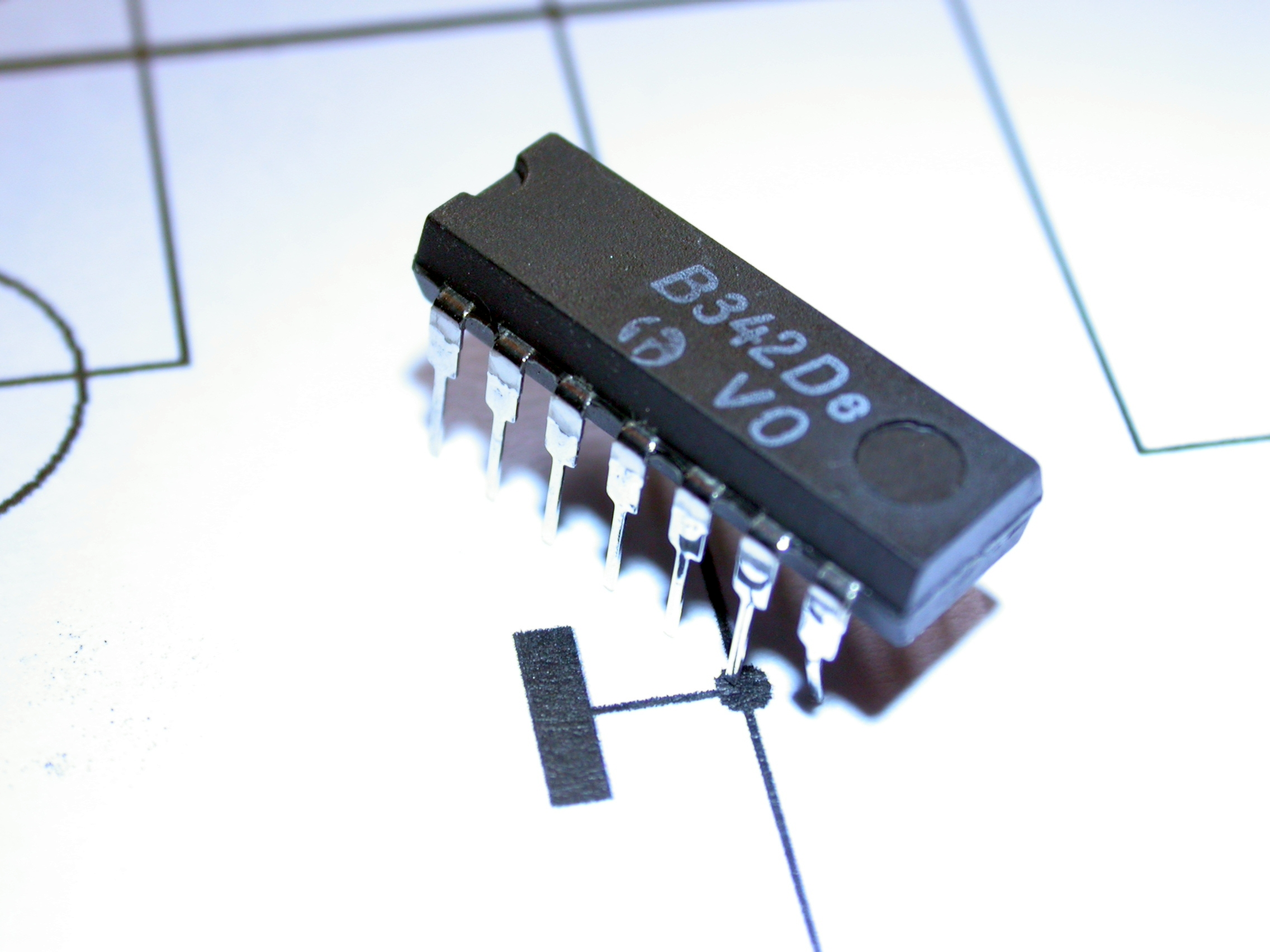
Transistor array (manufactured 1987)

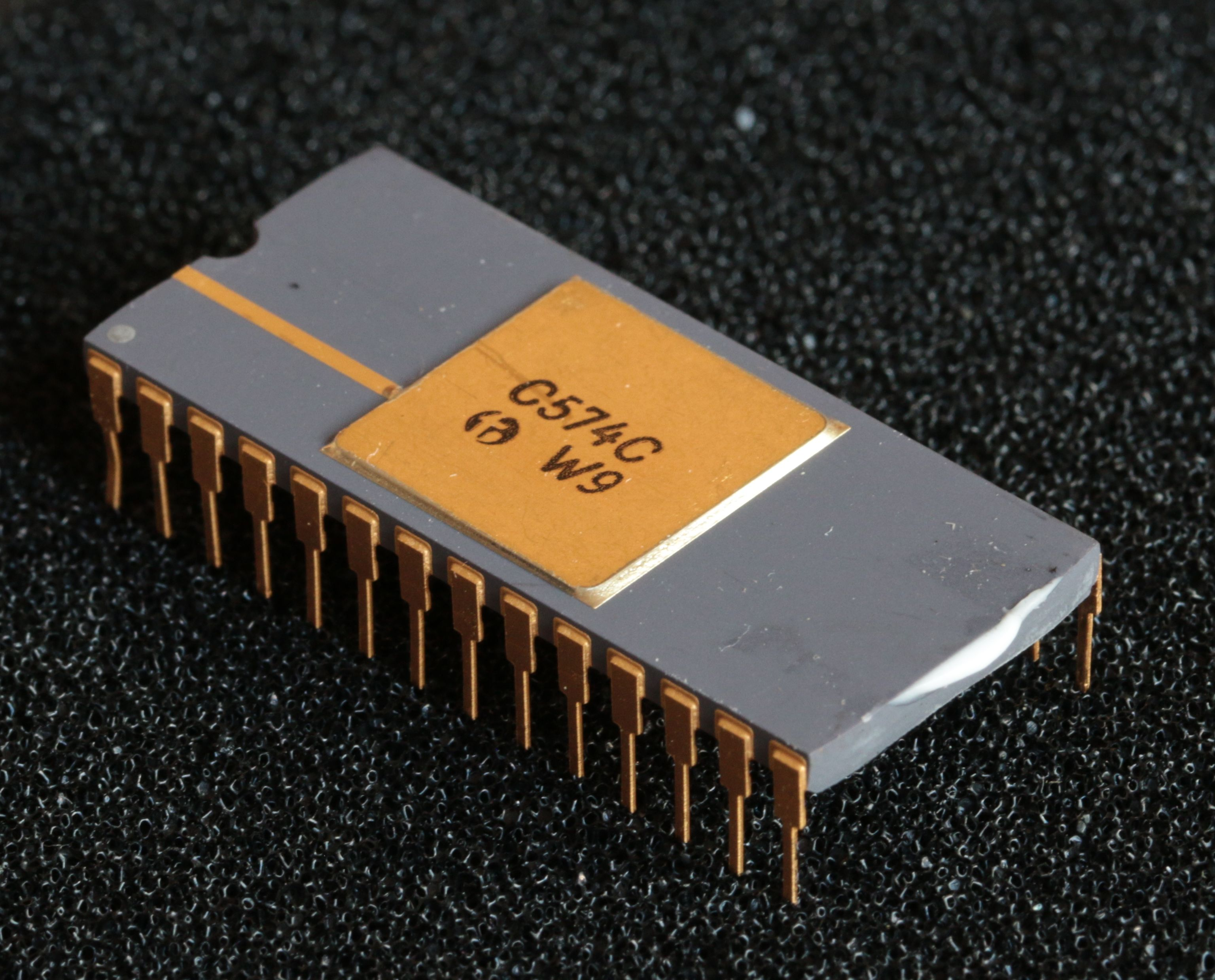
12-bit ADC integrated circuit (manufactured 1988)

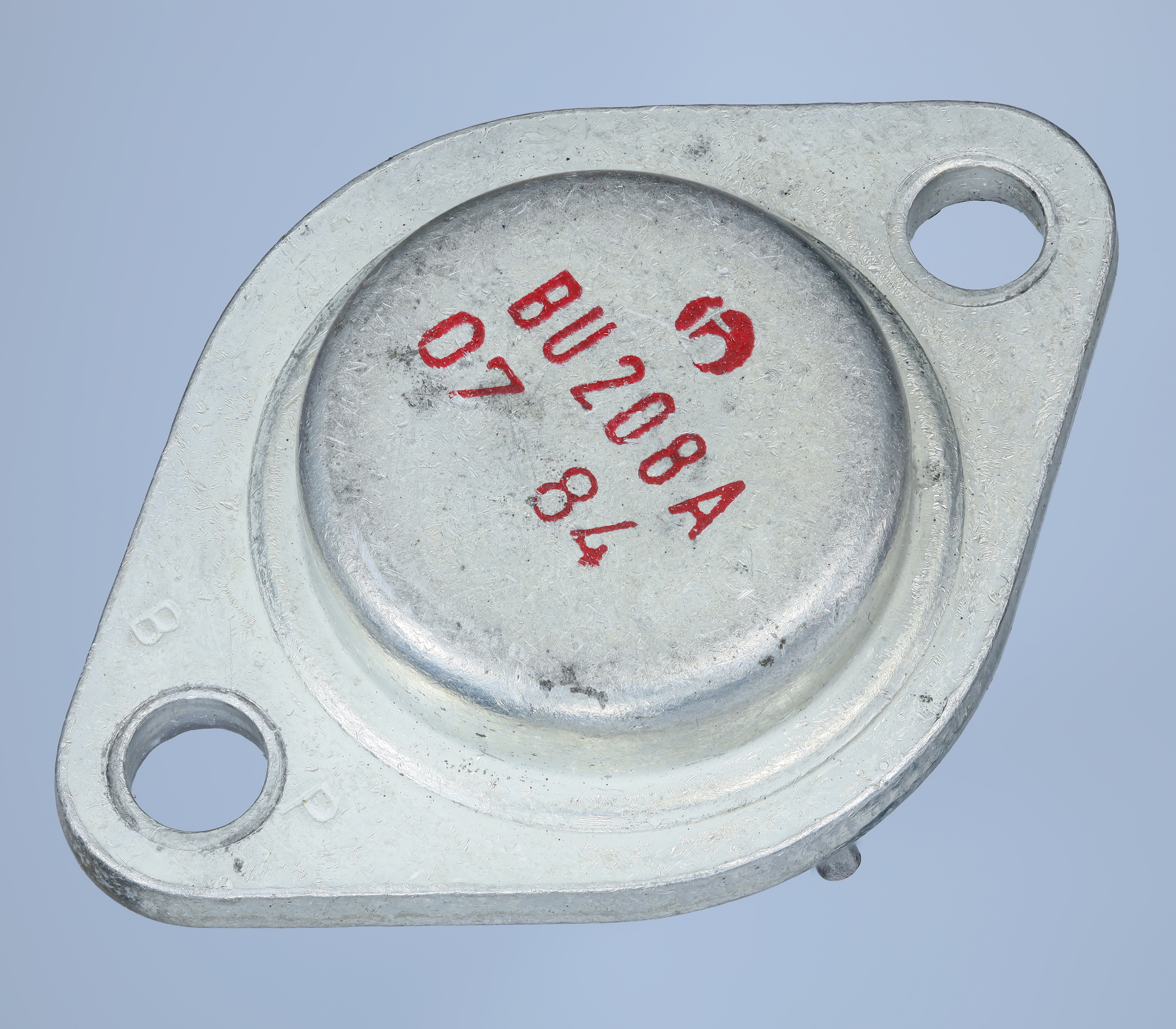
High voltage bipolar power transistor (manufactured 1984)

=== Consumer goods ===
Like most larger enterprises in East Germany, HFO was obligated to produce consumer goods in order to alleviate the general shortage of the latter. The main product range of HFO's consumer goods department was a series of clock-radios (RC35, RC85, RC86, RC87, RC100). One clock-radio model, the TRR81, sported a built-in pocket calculator. Further consumer products were the video game console BSS 01 and electric fence energizers for agricultural use. Closer to its main product lines, HFO also offered electronic kits for hobbyists. Initially, transistors that did not meet the official specifications or surplus transistors (as HFO was also the main importer of transistors for East Germany) were packaged into kits. Kits for devices such as an amplifier for record players followed later.

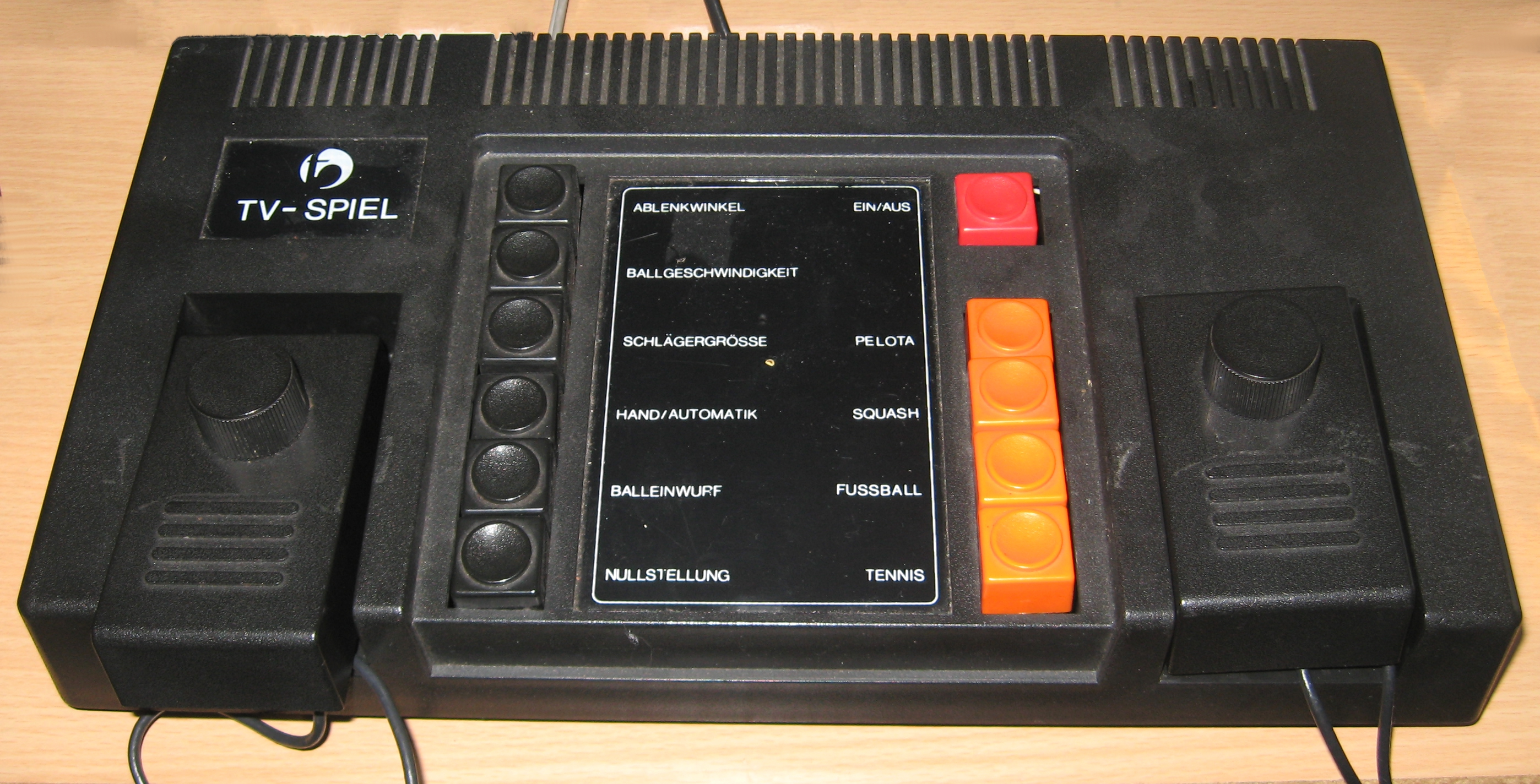
Video game console BSS 01

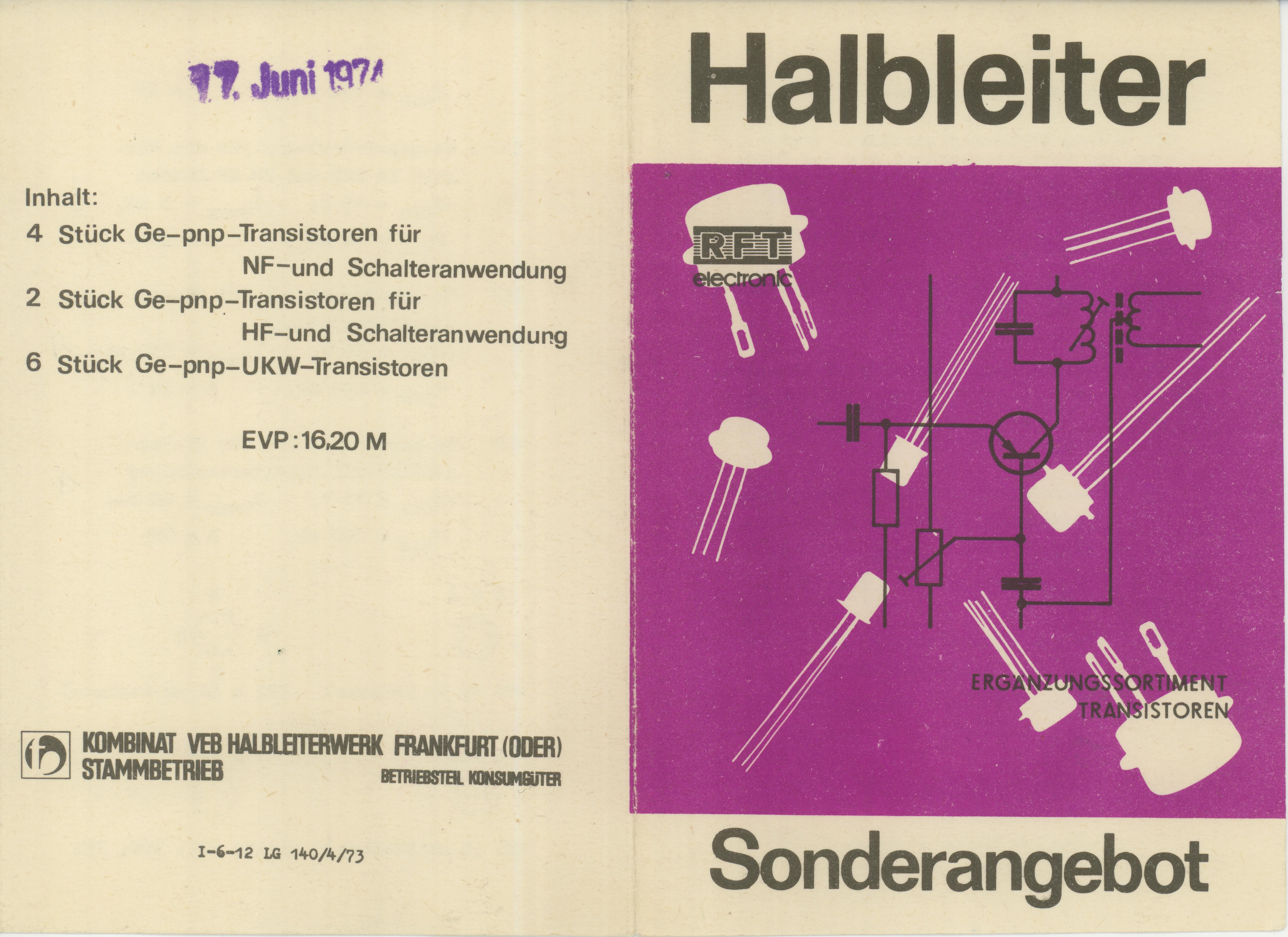
Booklet accompanying a set of germanium transistors for hobbyists (1974)

== See also ==
- Electronics industry in East Germany
