= Werner Hartmann (physicist) =

German physicist

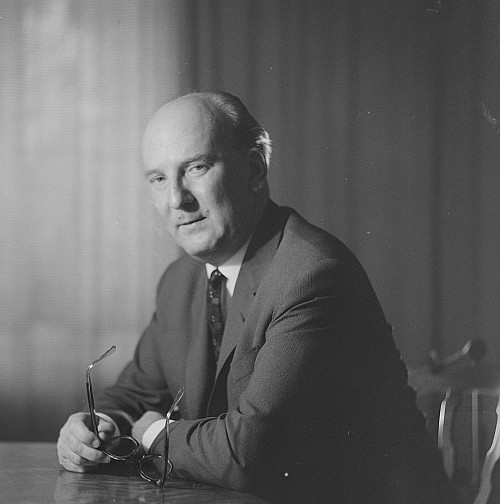
Werner Hartmann (1964)

Werner Hartmann (30 January 1912 – 8 March 1988) was a German physicist who introduced microelectronics into East Germany. He studied physics at the Technische Hochschule Berlin and worked at Siemens before joining Fernseh GmbH. At the end of World War II, he and his research staff were flown to the Soviet Union to work on their atomic bomb project; he was assigned to Institute G. In 1955, he arrived in the German Democratic Republic (GDR); in the same year, he founded and became the director of the VEB Vakutronik Dresden, later VEB RFT Meßelektronik Dresden. In 1956, he completed his Habilitation at the Technische Hochschule Dresden and also became a professor for Kernphysikalische Elektronik there. In 1961, he founded the Arbeitsstelle für Molekularelektronik Dresden (AME). He was awarded the National Prize of GDR in 1958. In 1974, he was removed from his positions, significantly demoted, and sent to work as a staff scientist at the VEB Spurenmetalle Freiberg. Hartmann had been the object of security investigations by the Stasi for some time; while he was investigated at length and repeatedly interrogated, the alleged charges were politically motivated and no trial ever took place. The Werner-Hartmann-Preis für Chipdesign is an industrial award given in Hartmann's honor for achievement in the field of semiconductors.

== Early life ==
Hartmann was born in Berlin-Friedenau. In 1930, he began studies in physics at the Technische Hochschule Berlin (reorganized and renamed the Technische Universität Berlin in 1946). His professors there included Walter Schottky and Gustav Hertz.

== Career ==
=== In Germany ===
In 1935, Hartmann became a research associate to Gustav Hertz, Nobel laureate and director of Research Laboratory II at Siemens. At Siemens, he engaged in research on semiconductors. In 1937, he began work at Fernseh GmbH; his work there made him exempt from military service during World War II.

=== In the Soviet Union ===
Hartmann's 10 years in the Soviet Union are best understood in the context of the collective fate of five prominent Berlin scientists in 1945, one of them being his teacher and mentor, Gustav Hertz.

At the close of World War II, the Soviet Union had special search teams operating in Austria and Germany, especially in Berlin, to identify and “requisition” equipment, materiel, intellectual property, and personnel useful to the Soviet atomic bomb project. The exploitation teams were under the Russian Alsos, and they were headed by Lavrenij Beria's deputy, Colonel General A. P. Zavenyagin. These teams were composed of scientific staff members, in NKVD officer's uniforms, from the bomb project's only laboratory, Laboratory No. 2, in Moscow. In mid-May 1945, the Soviet nuclear physicists Georgy Flerov and Lev Artsimovich, in NKVD colonel's uniforms, compelled Karl Zimmer to take them to the location of Nikolaus Riehl and his staff, who had evacuated their Auergesellschaft facilities and were west of Berlin, hoping to be in an area occupied by the American or British military forces; Riehl was the scientific director for Auergesellschaft and involved in the German atomic energy project Uranverin. Riehl was detained at the search team's facility in Berlin-Friedrichshagen for a week. This sojourn in Berlin turned into 10 years in the Soviet Union! Riehl was sent there to head a group, at Plant No. 12 in Ehlektrostal’ (Электросталь), tasked with industrializing the production of reactor-grade uranium.

Manfred von Ardenne, director of his private laboratory Forschungslaboratorium für Elektronenphysik, Gustav Hertz, Nobel laureate and director of Research Laboratory II at Siemens, Peter Adolf Thiessen, ordinarius professor at the Humboldt University of Berlin and director of the Kaiser-Wilhelm Institut für physikalische Chemie und Elektrochemie in Berlin-Dahlem, and Max Volmer, ordinarius professor and director of the Physical Chemistry Institute at the Technische Hochschule Berlin, had made a pact. The pact was a pledge that whoever first made contact with the Soviets would speak for the rest. The objectives of their pact were threefold:

- Prevent plunder of their institutes,
- Continue their work with minimal interruption, and
- Protect themselves from prosecution for any political acts of the past.

Before the end of World War II, Thiessen, a member of the Nationalsozialistische Deutsche Arbeiterpartei, had Communist contacts. On 27 April 1945, Thiessen arrived at von Ardenne's institute in an armored vehicle with a major of the Soviet Army, who was also a leading Soviet chemist. All four of the pact members were taken to the Soviet Union along with colleagues from their institutes. Hertz was made head of Institute G, in Agudseri (Agudzery), about 10 km southeast of Sukhumi and a suburb of Gul’rips (Gulrip’shi). Topics assigned to Gustav Hertz's Institute G included:

- Separation of isotopes by diffusion in a flow of inert gases, for which Gustav Hertz was the leader,
- Development of a condensation pump, for which Justus Mühlenpfordt was the leader,
- Design and build a mass spectrometer for determining the isotopic composition of uranium, for which Werner Schütze was the leader,
- Development of frameless (ceramic) diffusion partitions for filters, for which Reinhold Reichmann was the leader, and
- Development of a theory of stability and control of a diffusion cascade, for which Heinz Barwich was the leader.

Barwich had been deputy to Hertz at Siemens. Other members of Institute G were Werner Schütze, Karl-Franz Zühlke, and Werner Hartmann. Von Ardenne was made head of Institute A, in Sinop, a suburb of Sukhumi. Volmer went to the Nauchno-Issledovatel’skij Institut-9 (NII-9, Scientific Research Institute No. 9), in Moscow; he was given a design bureau to work on the production of heavy water. At Institute A, Thiessen became leader for developing techniques for manufacturing porous barriers for isotope separation.

The importance of certain scientists and their staffs to the Soviet atomic bomb project was underscored by their being flown to the Soviet Union shortly after the fall of Berlin, announced by the Soviets on 2 May 1945. For example, Manfred von Ardenne and his staff were flown to Moscow on 21 May and Nikolaus Riehl and his staff were flown to Moscow on 9 July. Hartmann and his research staff were flown there on 13 June. Hartmann worked in Agudseri (Agudzery), at Institute G, directed by Gustav Hertz.

=== In Germany again ===
In preparation for release from the Soviet Union, it was standard practice to put German scientists into quarantine for a few years if they worked on the Soviet atomic bomb project. Once these talented and capable scientists arrived in the German Democratic Republic (GDR, German: Deutsche Demokratische Republik (DDR)), they were plied with high salaries, honors, and good positions as inducements to keep them in the GDR for maintenance of information security (counterintelligence) and both technological and economic development of the GDR.

Hartmann and his group were released from the Soviet Union in March 1955, and they went to the GDR. There, Hartmann demonstrated his scientific and managerial talents in a number of ways, including the founding of an institute which became a leading institute for microelectronics in the entire Soviet Bloc. However, his apolitical nature was the start of a problem for him in the Soviet Union and it followed him into the GDR and magnified under the ruling Party there.

In 1955, Hartmann founded and became the director of the Volkseigener Betrieb Vakutronik Dresden (VEB Dresden, Dresden Vakutronik People's Enterprise); later, it became the Volkseigener Betrieb Rundfunk-und-Fernmeldewesen Meßelektronik Dresden (VEB RFT Meßelektronik Dresden, Dresden Radio and Telecommunications Technology Measurements Electronics People's Enterprise).

In order to teach at a German university, one had to have a doctorate as well as complete Habilitation; Hartmann completed the latter, in 1956, at the Technische Hochschule Dresden (after reorganization and renaming in 1961: Technische Universität Dresden), where he then also became a professor of Kernphysikalische Elektronik. From 1956 and 1957, the Technische Hochschule Dresden had on the faculty other notable German scientists who had returned from working on the Soviet atomic bomb project, including Heinz Barwich (Institute G), Heinz Pose and Ernst Rexer (Laboratory V), and Josef Schintlmeister (Laboratory of Measuring Instruments.)

In 1959 and 1970, Hartmann was awarded the Nationalpreis.

In 1961, Hartmann founded the Arbeitsstelle für Molekularelektronik Dresden (AME, Dresden Office for Microelectronics; 1969 renamed in AMD), which became a leading institute for microelectronics in the entire Soviet Bloc. Hartmann's AMD is not to be confused with AMD Saxony, which is a facility belonging to the American company Advanced Micro Devices. In 1987, Hartmann's institute was recently renamed in Zentrum Mikroelektronik Dresden. ZMD produced the GDR's first 1-megabyte DRAM U61000 in 1988 and is today a fabless semiconductor company named ZMDI

Hartmann had been under surveillance in the Soviet Union, since 1947, for “anti-Soviet statements and attitudes.” After his return to Germany, he was the subject of the intelligence investigation Tablette (Tablet). Hartmann's reading of foreign scientific journals, as well as his management style, brought suspicion on him and accusations of introducing “managerial methods of capitalist countries.” From his apolitical nature, he disliked the way the Sozialistische Einheitspartei Deutschlands (SED, Socialist Unity Party of Germany – the ruling party in the GDR) characterized and split the German people into two categories, either “party members” or “non-members”. This resulted in allegations of “non-political conformity” and “disloyalty to the SED”, a direct result from the SED's suspicious view of members of the industrial elite who were not members of the Party. Furthermore, it was even alleged that he spent too much time writing scientific articles. In 1966, he fought receipt of a Soviet security clearance, as he feared this would limit his travel in and scientific contact with the West. In 1974, Hartmann was an object of the security investigation Molekül (Molecule) by the Ministerium für Staatssicherheit (MfS, Ministry for State Security) – the Stasi.

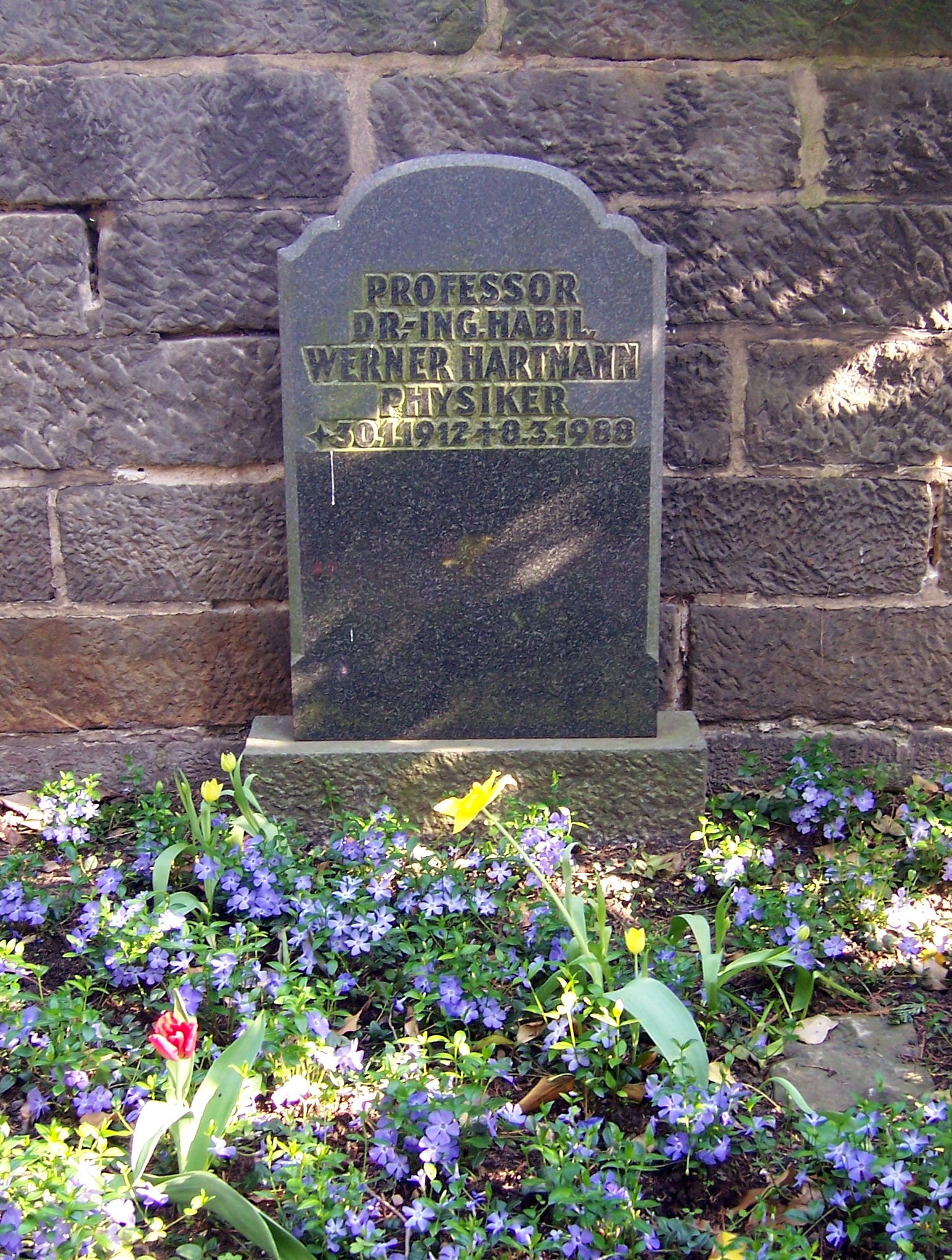
Hartmann's grave at Loschwitz Cemetery in Dresden

In 1974, Hartmann was removed from his positions, significantly downgraded in position, salary (84% cut), and pension rights, and sent to work as a staff scientist at the VEB Spurenmetalle Freiberg. He was repeatedly taken in for lengthy interrogations during the period 1974 to 1976, and he was threatened with trial for “economic crimes.” However, no trial was to take place.

Hartmann retired in 1977.

Hartmann died in Dresden on 8 March 1988, due to complications after prostate surgery.

== Honors ==
- National Prize – 1959 and 1970
- The Werner-Hartmann-Preis für Chipdesign (Werner Hartmann Prize for Chip Design) is awarded by the Zentrum Mikroelektronik Dresden (ZMD, Dresden Center for Microelectronics)
