= Electronics industry in East Germany =

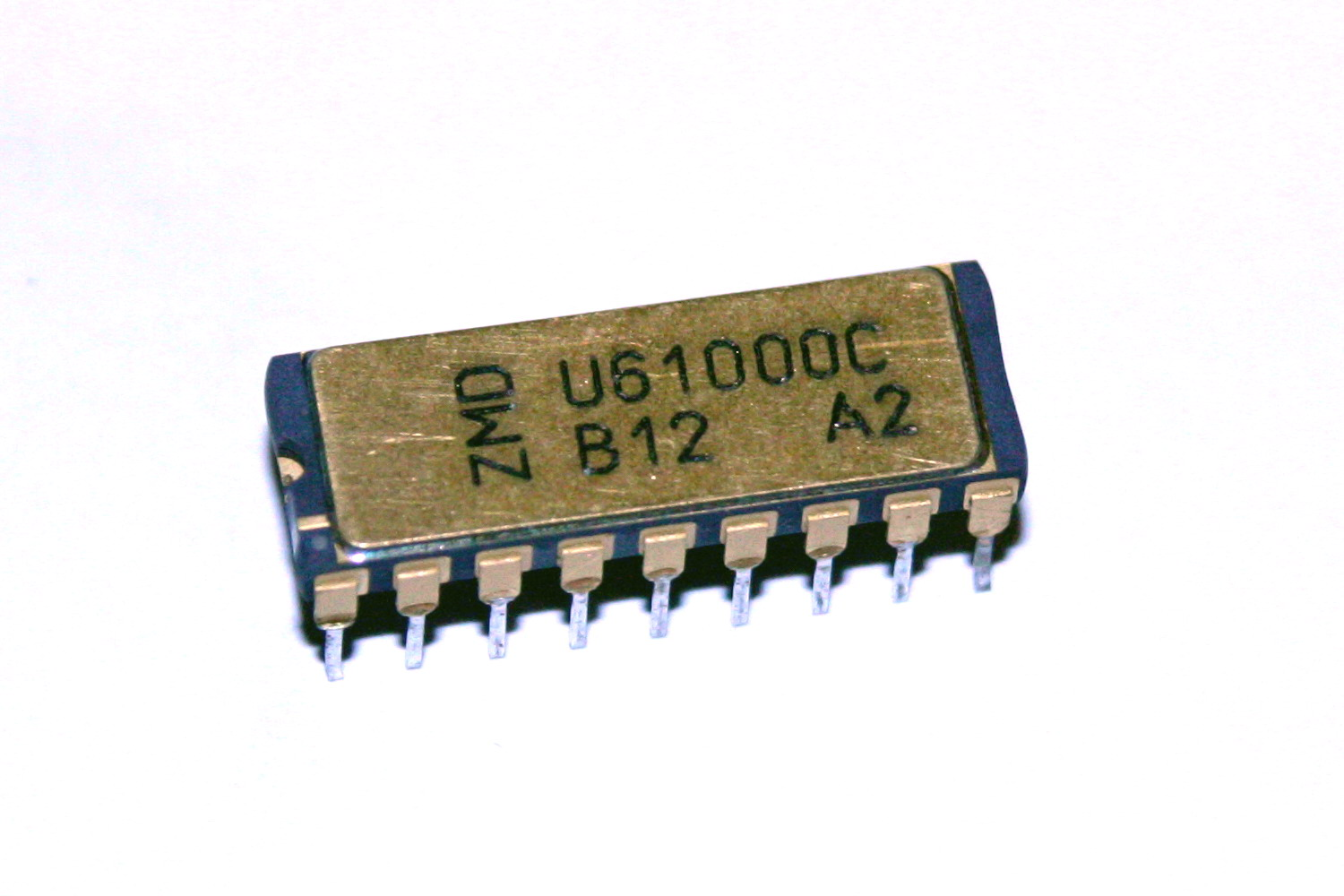
U61000: the first 1-Mbit memory chip produced by the GDR

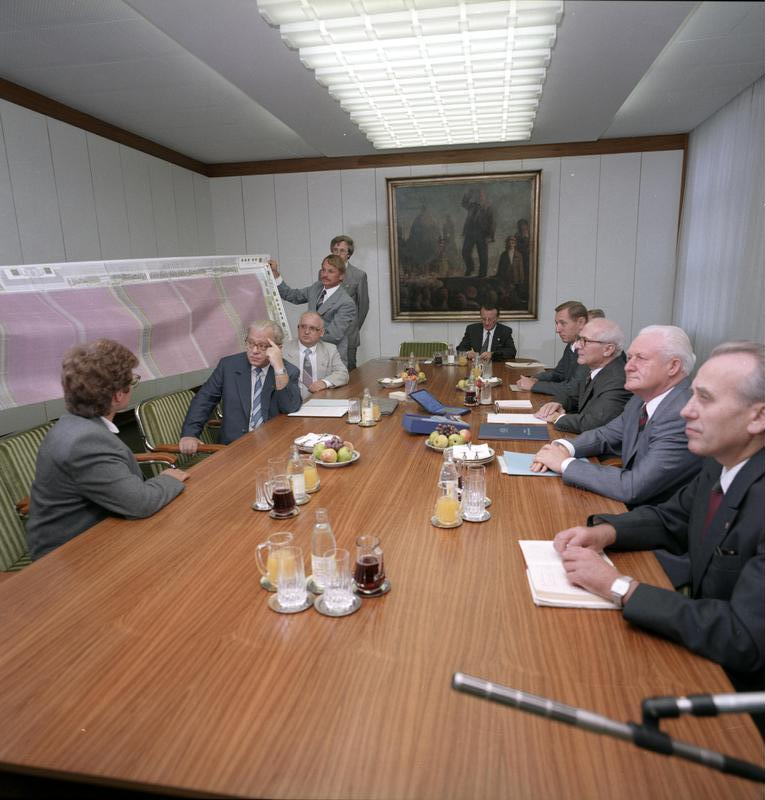
Presenting the first 1Mb microchip to Erich Honecker, September 12, 1988

East Germany was one of the leading computer producers in the Eastern Bloc as purchases of higher technologies from the West were under various embargoes. A program of illegal purchases, copying and reverse engineering of Western examples was established, after which GDR sold these computers to COMECON countries. Under the rule of Erich Honecker, electronics, microelectronics and data processing industries grew at average 11.4% in the 1970s and 12.9% during the 1980s.

== Structure in 1989 ==
In the years just before German Reunification, the electronics industry was structured into business conglomerates called Kombinate (combine). Semiconductor manufacturing equipment was produced by Kombinat Carl Zeiss Jena. Using this equipment VEB Kombinat Elektronische Bauelemente Teltow manufactured passive electronic components and VEB Kombinat Mikroelektronik Erfurt active electronic components. In turn, VEB Kombinat Robotron Dresden assembled these components into a range of computers. VEB Kombinat Rundfunk- und Fernsehtechnik Staßfurt produced consumer electronics such as radio receivers, cassette decks, and television sets while telecommunications equipment was provided by VEB Kombinat Nachrichtenelektronik Berlin. With the exception of Carl Zeiss and Robotron, most components and devices were sold under the common trademark RFT (from Rundfunk- und Fernmelde-Technik).^{[de]}

== History ==
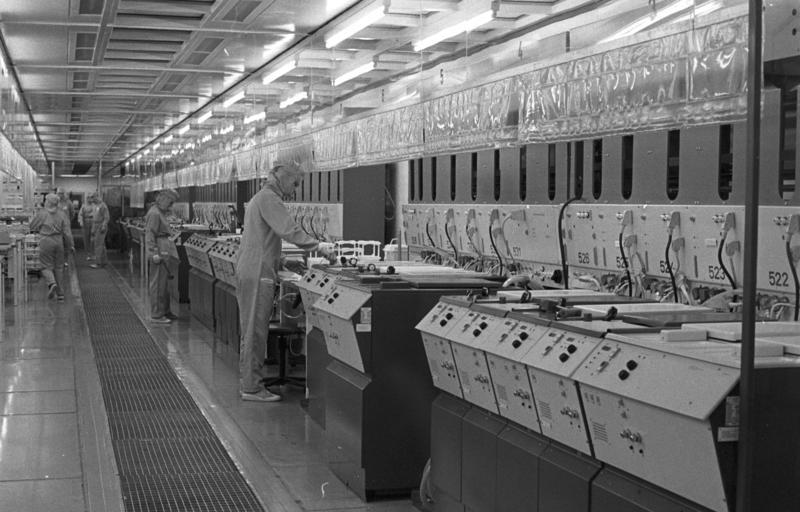
An East German semiconductor factory around 1989.

From 1977 the attempt to achieve a competitive edge in microchips against the research and development resources of the entire western world – in a state of just 16 million people – was perhaps always doomed to failure, but swallowed increasing amounts of internal resources and hard currency. GDR was some five to eight years behind the leading producers of USA and Japan. To produce one 64kb chip cost 40 marks, while in the West it cost 4.50 marks. To produce one 256kb chip cost 534 marks, while in the West it cost 5.00 to 7.00 marks.

The microelectronics industry in the GDR began in 1961 when the "Arbeitsstelle für Molekularelektronik Dresden" (Department of Molecular Electronics Dresden) was established in Dresden. Later it grew into "VEB Forschungszentrum Mikroelektronik Dresden". (People's Enterprise Microelectronics Research Center Dresden)

The center of the East German microchip industry was in Dresden, where research and production laboratories were located. Production equipment was built by Carl Zeiss Jena and "VEB Elektromat Dresden". The actual 13 mm x 5 mm U61000 microchip production was done by "VEB Forschungszentrum Mikroelektronik Dresden" and it was presented publicly in September 1988. In total some 50,000 U61000 microchips were produced in early 1990 before the GDR was unified with West Germany, and the East German semiconductor industry dissolved. During the Cold War 3,500 people were employed in this microelectronics center. After reunification Dresden formed the nucleus for the modern day largest unified German cluster in semiconductor technologies; Silicon Saxony, with 40,000 employees.

== See also ==
- History of computer hardware in Eastern Bloc countries
