= BSS 01 =

1979 home video game console

Bilschirmspiel 01
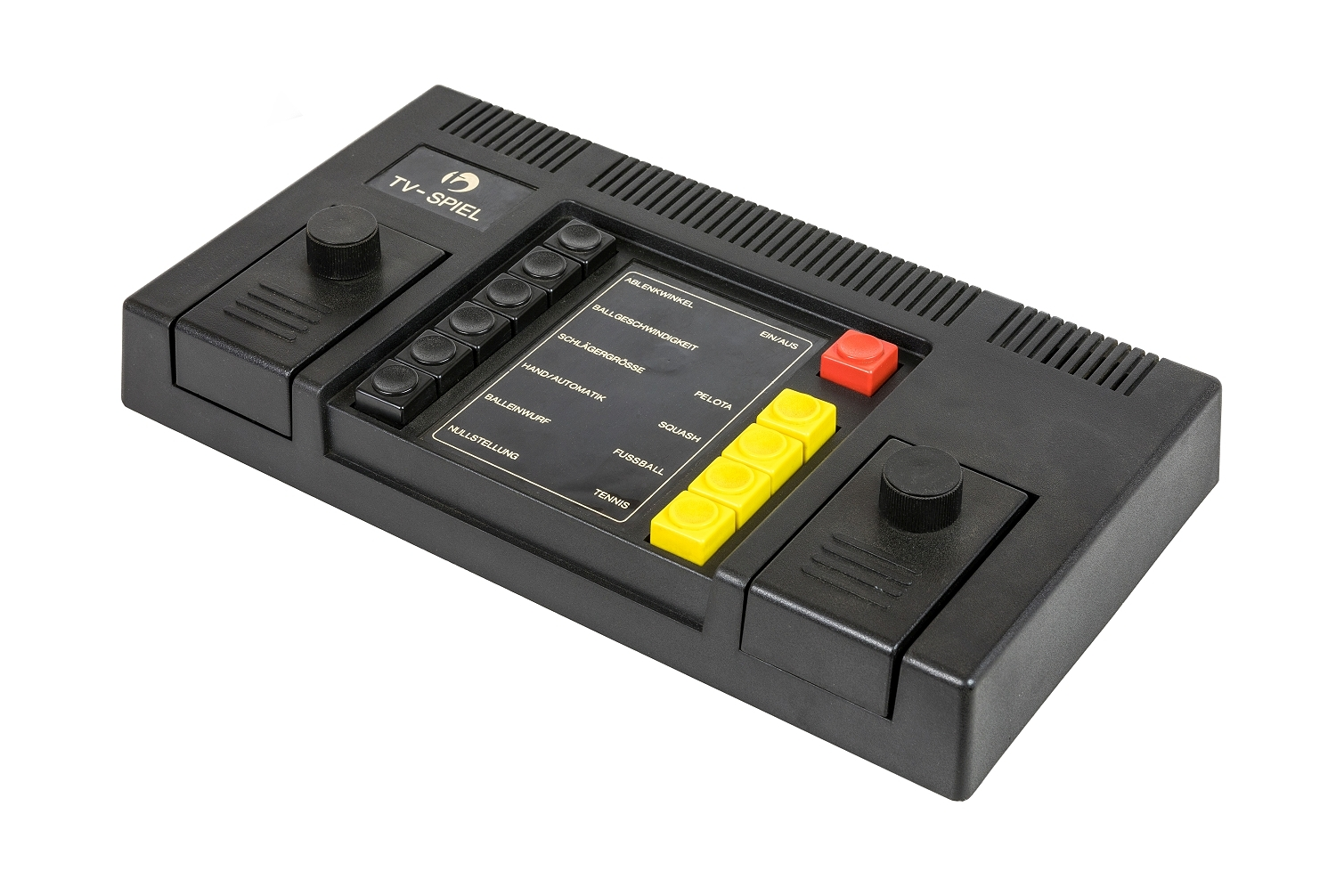
- BSS 01
- Also known as: BSS 01; RFT TV-Spiel; TV-Spiel
- Manufacturer: VEB Halbleiterwerk Frankfurt (Oder)
- Type: Dedicated home video game console
- Generation: First generation
- Released: 1979
- Introductory price: 550 East German Mark
- Discontinued: 1981
- Units sold: c. 1,000
- Units shipped: c. 1,000
- Sound: Played via an internal mono speaker
- Controller input: 2 hardwired joystick-based game controllers
- Power: 220 V, 2 W
- Dimensions: 32.5 x 5.5 x 17.5 cm (w x h x d)

The Bildschirmspiel 01 (BSS 01) is the only game console that was developed and manufactured in the German Democratic Republic (GDR). It is based on the integrated circuit AY-3-8500 by General Instrument. The gameplay, controls and audiovisual presentation of the four individually selectable games are similar to Pong. The BSS 01 was designed and produced by VEB Halbleiterwerk Frankfurt an der Oder (HFO). Its sales were started in 1979 under the RFT brand at a price of 550 East German marks. Due to a lack of profitability, production was discontinued after just two years. A successor device with more game options and additional colored image output did not pass the prototype stage.

== History ==
In the 1980s, video games in East Germany were to introduce children and young people to technology and show that the GDR was a progressive country. The BSS 01 was manufactured between 1979 and 1981 by the Kombinat Mikroelektronik Erfurt belonging VEB Halbleiterwerk Frankfurt (Oder) as a part of the Konsumgüterproduktion. The basis for this was the Pong integrated circuit AY-3-8500, imported by American company General Instrument. The word BSS 01 is derived from the German word Bildschirmspiel 01, meaning Screen Game 01 or Video Screen Game 01. The console was sold under the brand RFT, where RFT stands for Rundfunk- und Fernmelde-Technik which is a manufacturers' association of various telecommunication companies in East Germany, for 550 East German marks (this is about half of an average monthly income in East Germany at that time). It was mostly delivered to youth centers, leisure and educational institutions, where they were set up for free play. The BSS 01 sold about 1,000 times in its first production series. There were no further production series.

In the ZKM Center for Art and Media Karlsruhe, a tube TV with the BSS 01 can be played, with an old chair in the style of the 1980s.

=== Versions ===
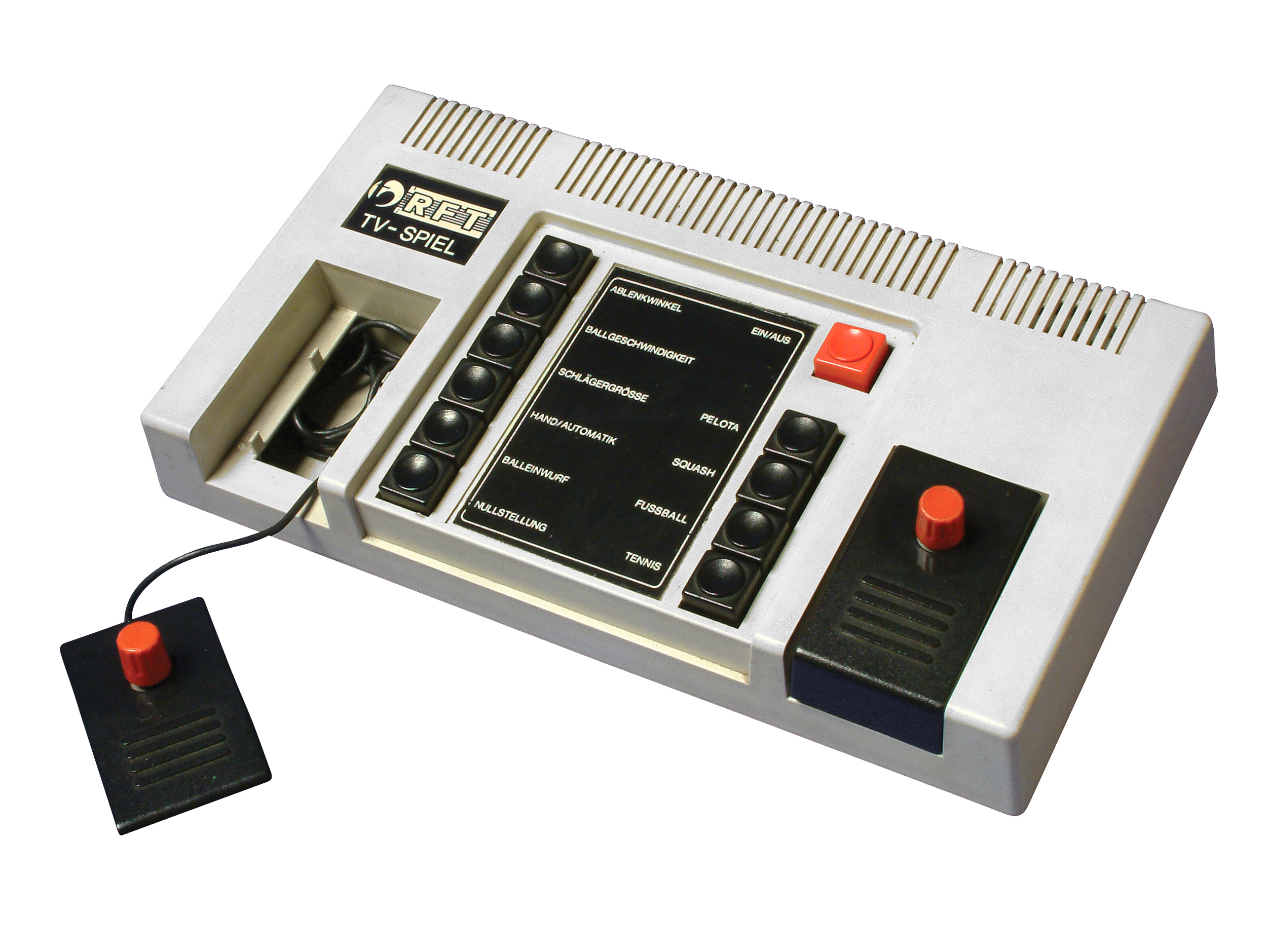
A BSS 01 with white housing

There are different colored versions of the BSS 01. Depending on the current material stock, the plastic colors of the console could differ slightly from each other, for example, in the housing color (white or black), the paddles (white, gray or black) or used on the right buttons (orange, red, yellow or black). However, the buttons on the left side are always black and the on/off switch on the top right is always red.

=== Successor ===
A successor of the BSS 01 named BSS 02, probably with color output instead of black-and-white, was planned, but then discarded for the production of radio clocks. Whether prototypes, sketches etc. of the BSS 02 exist is unknown.

== Technical specifications ==
The BSS 01 has a width of 32.5 cm, a height of 5.5 cm, a depth of 17.5 cm and a mass of 1.3 or 1.5 kg. It is based on the AY-3-8500-7 chipset from General Instrument. The sound is played through an internal mono speaker (model ARZ 090), rather than the TV set. The output was black-and-white via the TV's RF port on channel 3 (VHF). Power was supplied to the BSS 01 via a power cord with 220 V, 2 W and 75 Ohm.

There are two columns of mechanical buttons on the console, with which you can make various game settings such as deflection angle, ball speed, club size, ball throw and zero position (right column), and the console can be switched on and off and the games can be selected (left column).

=== Games ===
Due to the integrated AY-3-8500 chipset from General Instrument, the BSS 01 is able to play the following four games:

- Tennis (Pong clone)
- Fußball (association football)
- Squash
- Pelota
- two unnamed shooting games

The first three games can only be played with two players, a computer opponent is not available because the BSS 01 has no CPU built in. The game Pelota is designed for one player. The two shooting games can only be played with a lightgun that was never officially available for the BSS 01. By intervening in the hardware, it is possible to connect such a lightgun to the BSS 01, which unlocks the two games. If none of the game selection buttons is pressed when the power is off and the console is then switched on, the activated, but often hidden, handicapped version of soccer, which is included in the AY-3-8500-7 chip, is activated, in which the right player directly hits another racket right striker, which makes the game more difficult for the left player.

The throw-in of the ball could be set to automatic or manual. After the first player reaches 15 points, each of the games was over.
