= Josef Schintlmeister =

Austrian nuclear physicist (1908–1971)

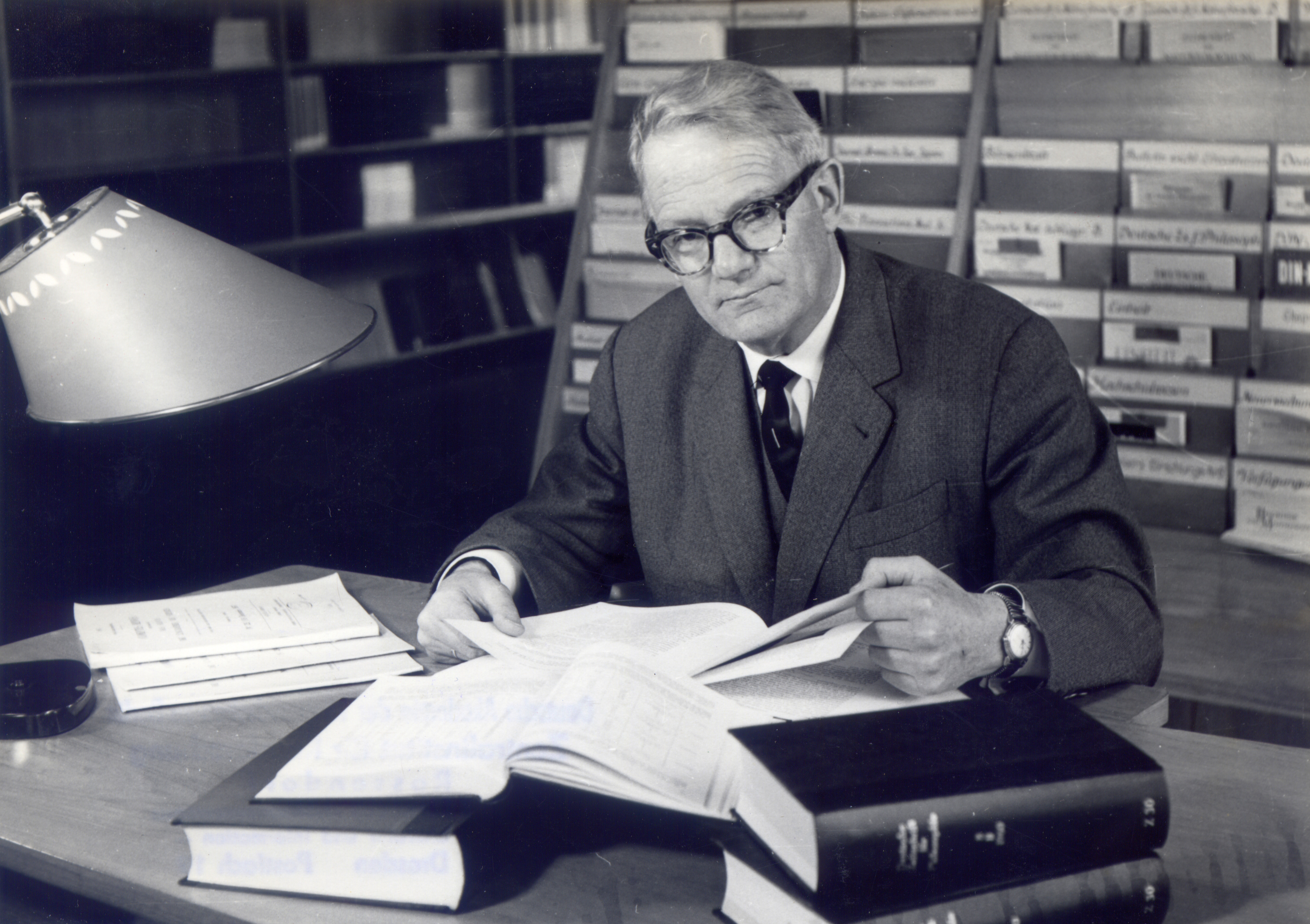
- Josef Schintlmeister (1908–71) c. 1968
- Born: Josef von Schintlmeister; June 16, 1908; Radstadt, Salzburg, Austria
- Died: August 14, 1971 (aged 63); Saalbach-Hinterglemm, Salzburg, Austria
- Siglum: Sepp
- Citizenship: Austria
- Education: University of Vienna
- Known for: Soviet program of nuclear weapons
- Awards: National Prize (1964)
- Scientific career
- Fields: Nuclear physics
- Workplaces: Laboratory No. 2 TU Dresden; Helmholtz-Zentrum Dresden-Rossendorf
- Thesis: Die Ionisation einzelner H-Strahlen im verschiedenen Gases (1932)

Josef von Schintlmeister (16 June 1908, Radstadt – 14 August 1971, Hinterglemm) was an Austrian nuclear physicist and an amateur alpinist.

Initially part of the German Uranverein, he was taken into Soviet custody and detained in Russia. There, he was one of many German nuclear physicists working on the Soviet program of nuclear weapons until 1955 when he returned to Austria, only to take teaching position at the TU Dresden, later becoming a senior scientist at the Helmholtz-Zentrum.

== In Austria ==
=== Education and early career ===
Schintlmeister attended the University of Vienna and completed his doctorate (Dr. Habil.) in physics.

During World War II, Schintlmeister, Dozent für Experimentalphysik (Docent for Experimental Physics), worked at the II. Physikalisches Institut der Universität, Wien (Second Physics Institute of the University of Vienna), where Georg Stetter was the director. One of his colleagues there was Willibald Jentschke. The Institute did research on transuranic elements and measurement of nuclear constants, in collaboration with the Institut für Radiumforschung (Institute for Radium Research) of the Österreichischen Adademie der Wissenschaften (Austrian Academy of Sciences). This work was done under the German nuclear energy project, also known as the Uranverein (Uranium Club); see, for example, the publications cited below under Internal Reports.

In work completed in June 1940 and published in 1941, Schintlmeister had followed a line of reasoning similar to that of Carl Friedrich von Weizsäcker and Fritz Houtermans and had predicted the existence of the 94th element, plutonium. In two papers published in May 1941, Schintlmeister spelled out the implications of the 94th element in that it could be generated in a Uranmaschine (uranium machine, i.e., a nuclear reactor) and that it would be fissionable.

== In Russia ==
Near the close of World War II, the Soviet Union sent special search teams into Germany to locate and deport German nuclear scientists or any others who could be of use to the Soviet atomic bomb project. The Russian Alsos teams were headed by NKVD Colonel General A. P. Zavenyagin and staffed with numerous scientists, from their only nuclear laboratory, attired in NKVD officer's uniforms. The main search team, headed by Colonel General Zavenyagin, arrived in Berlin on 3 May, the day after Russia announced the fall of Berlin to their military forces; it included Colonel General V. A. Makhnjov, and nuclear physicists Yulij Borisovich Khariton, Isaak Konstantinovich Kikoin, and Lev Andreevich Artsimovich.

Scientists who were sent to the Soviet Union were assigned to facilities under authority of the NKVD's 9th Chief Directorate, headed by Zavenyagin. The facilities were principally the following: Laboratory 2 (Moscow), Scientific Research Institute No. 9 (Moscow), Elektrostal Plant No. 12, Institutes A (Sinop, a suburb of Sukhumi) and G (Agudzery), Laboratory B (Sungul), and Laboratory V (Obninsk).

Schintlmeister was assigned to Laboratory 2, later known as the Laboratory for Measuring Instruments (LIPAN), and then the Kurchatov Institute of Atomic Energy, and today known as the Russian Scientific Center "Kurchatov Institute", in Moscow.

== Return to Austria ==
In preparation for release from the Soviet Union, it was standard practice to put personnel into quarantine for a few years if they worked on projects related to the Soviet atomic bomb project, which Schintlmeister did. After quarantine, he was sent to Vienna in 1955. Soon thereafter, he took positions in the Deutsche Demokratische Republik (DDR, German Democratic Republic). He was appointed professor of nuclear physics at the Technische Hochschule Dresden (today, Technische Universität Dresden). Additionally, he was a leading scientist at the Zentralinstitut für Kernforschung Rossendorf (ZfK, Central Institute for Nuclear Research Rossendorf, today Helmholtz-Zentrum Dresden-Rossendorf) near Dresden. Other notable German scientists, who worked on the Soviet atomic bomb project and joined Schintlmeister at the Technische Hochschule Dresden were the physicists Heinz Barwich and Werner Hartmann from Institute G in Agudzery and Heinz Pose and Ernst Rexer from Laboratory V in Obninsk.

On Schintlmeister's return to Vienna, he was invited to the British embassy, where a Scientific and Technical Intelligence Branch (STIB) officer asked him about his time in the Soviet Union. Schintlmeister declined the request. Once, visiting Austria after he had taken the positions in Dresden, British officials offered him the choice of either defecting or becoming a source in the Bloc, preferably the Soviet Union. STIB archives confirms that Schintlmeister was a target of British MI6, the Secret Intelligence Service.

Schintlmeister died of a heart attack while on vacation in Hinterglemm near Saalbach on 14 August 1971.

== Internal reports ==
The following reports were published in Kernphysikalische Forschungsberichte (Research Reports in Nuclear Physics), an internal publication of the German Uranverein. The reports were classified Top Secret, they had very limited distribution, and the authors were not allowed to keep copies. The reports were confiscated under the Allied Operation Alsos and sent to the United States Atomic Energy Commission for evaluation. In 1971, the reports were declassified and returned to Germany. The reports are available at the Karlsruhe Nuclear Research Center and the American Institute of Physics.

- Josef Schintlmeister and F. Hernegger Über ein bisher unbekanntes, alpha-strahlendes chemisches Element G-55 (10 December 1940)
- Josef Schintlmeister Die Stellung des Elementes mit Alphastrahlen von 1,8 cm Reichweite im periodischen System. III Bericht G-111 (23 May 1941)
- Josef Schintlmeister and F. Hernegger Weitere chemische Untersuchungen an dem Element mit Alphastrahlen von 1,8 cm Reichweite. II Bericht G-112 (May 1941)
- Josef Schintlmeister Die Aussichten für eine Energieerzeugung durch Kernspaltung des 1,8 cm Alphastrahlers G-186 (26 February 1942)

== Selected publications ==
=== Articles ===
- Gustav Ortner and Josef Schintlmeister Zur Radioaktivität von Samarium, Zeitschrift für Physik Issue Volume 90, Numbers 9–10, 698–699 (1934). Institutional citations: Ortner – Institut für Radiumforschung and Schintlmeister – II. Physikalisches Institut der Universität, Wien. Received on 12 July 1934.
- R. Nathe, J. Schintlmeister, H. Seidenfaden, and R. Weibrecht The focusing of beta particles in a short-lens spectrometer [In German], Exptl. Tech. Physik Volume 9: Numer 1, 1–12 (1961). Institutional citation: Research Org Amt fur Kernforschung und Kerntechnik der DDR.
- J. Mösner, G. Schmidt and J. Schintlmeister Four-particle disintegration of nitrogen by fast neutrons. Institutional citation: Zentralinstitut für Kernforschung, Bereich "Kernphysik", Rossendorf bei, Dresden, DDR. Received 12 June 1967.
- Günter Schmidt, Jürgen Mösner and Josef Schintlmeister† A study of the reaction ^{14}N(n, 2)^{7}Li. Institutional citation: Zentralinstitut für Kernforschung, Bereich Kernphysik, Rossendorf bei Dresden, DDR. Received 5 August 1970; revised 28 April 1971.

=== Books ===
- Josef Schintlmeister Die Elekronenröhre als physikalisches Meßgerät. Röhrenvoltmeter. Röhrengalvanometer. Röhrenelektrometer. (Springer Verlag, 1942, 1943) (Edwards Brothers, Inc., 1945)
- Jakov I. Frenkel', Josef Schintlmeister, and Fritz Bartels Prinzipien der Theorie der Atomkerne (Akademie-Verl., 1957)
- Heinz Barwich, Josef Schintlmeister, and Fritz Thümmler Das Zentralinstitut für Kernphysik am Beginn seiner Arbeit (Akademie-Verl., 1958)
- Wunibald Kunz and Josef Schintlmeister Tabellen der Atomkerne. Teil 1: Eigenschaften der Atomkerne. Band 1: Die Elemente Neutron bis Zinn. (Akademie-Verlag, 1958)
- Wunnibald Kunz and Josef Schintlmeister Tabellen der Atomkerne. – (2 Bände) – Teil I: Eigenschaften der Atomkerne, Band 1: Die Elemente Neutron bis Zinn; Band 2: Die Elemente Antimon bis Nobelium. (Akademie-Verl., 1958)
- Wunibald Kunz and Josef Schintlmeister Nuclear Tables – In Two Volumes (Permagon Press, 1959)
- Wunibald Kunz and Josef Schintlmeister Tabellen der Atomkerne. T. 1. Eigenschaften der Atomkerne. Bd. 2. Die Elemente Antimon bis Nobelium (Akademie-Verl., 1959)
- Josef Schintlmeister (editor), Soviet authors: Boris S. Dzelepov, A. I. Bas, J. A. Smorodinskij, and German authors: Karlheinz Müller, and Mercedes Alvarez-Otto Der Isospin von Atomkernen (Akademie-Verl., 1960)
- Wunibald Kunz and Josef Schintlmeister Nuclear Tables – Part II: Nuclear Reactions – Volume 1: The Elements from Neutron to Magnesium (Permagon Press, 1965)
- Wunibald Kunz und Josef Schintlmeister Tabellen der Atomkerne. T. 2. Kernreaktionen Bd. 1. Die Elemente Neutron bis Magnesium. (Akademie-Verl., 1965)
- Wunibald Kunz and Josef Schintlmeister Tabellen der Atomkerne. T. 2. Kernreaktionen Bd. 2. Die Elemente Aluminium bis Schwefel. (Akademie-Verl., 1967)
- Wunibald Kunz and Josef Schintlmeister Tabellen der Atomkerne. Teil II: Kernraktionen. Bd. 3 Die Elemente Chlor bis Calcium. (Akademie-Verl., 1967)
- Franz Rudolf Keßler and Josef Schintlmeister Einführung in die physikalischen Grundlagen der Kernenergiegewinnung (Akademie-Verl., 1969)
- Aage Bohr, Ben R. Mottelson, Josef Schintlmeister, and Hans-Rainer Kissener Struktur der Atomkerne I. Einteilchenbewegung (Hanser Fachbuchverlag, 1980)
