= ZMDI =

Microelectronics research center in East Germany

Coordinates: 51°07′32″N 13°47′06″E

Zentrum Mikroelektronik Dresden

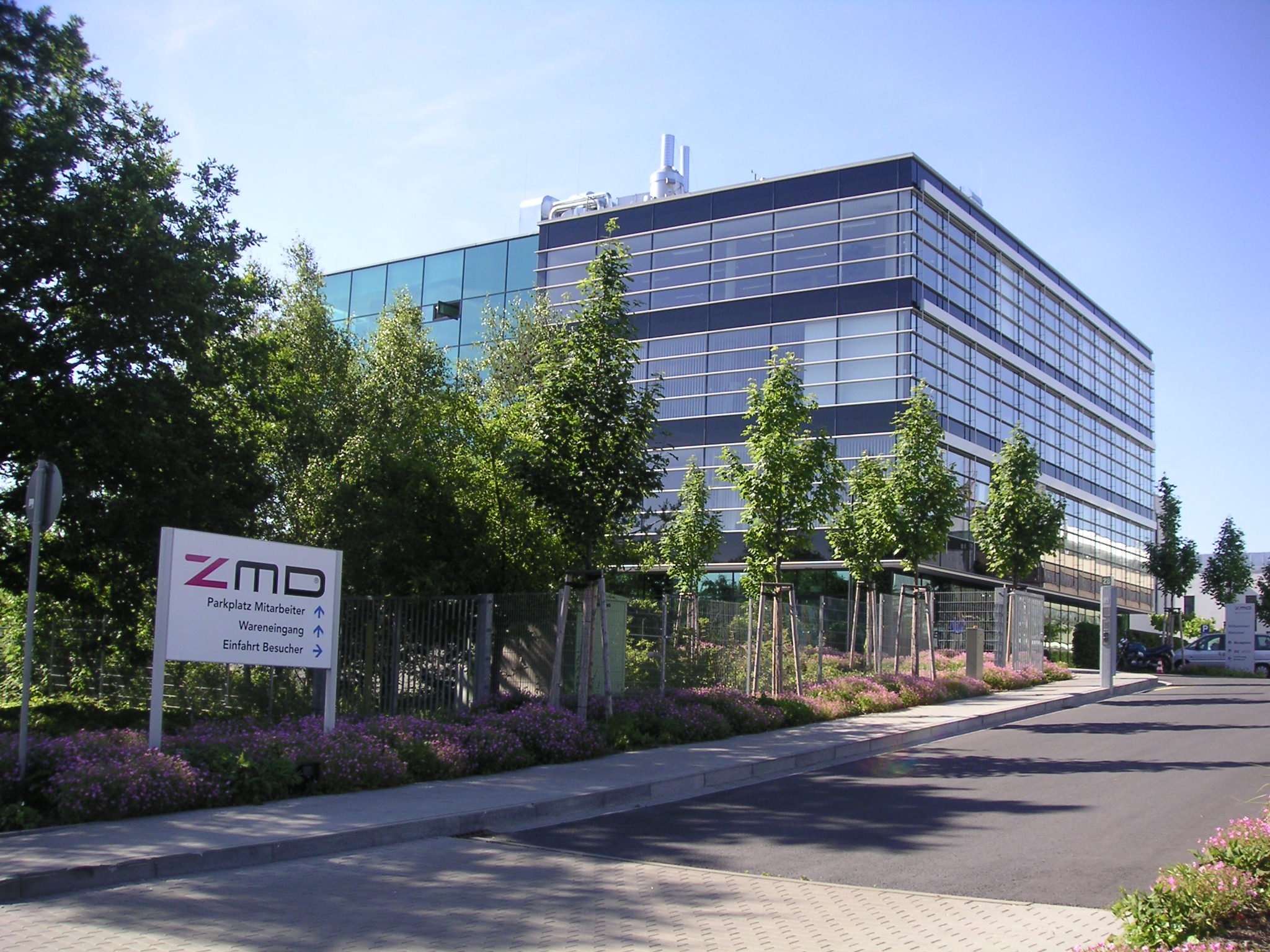
- ZMD Design Center in Dresden (2006)
- Company type: VEB; GmbH; AG
- Industry: Semiconductors
- Founded: August 1, 1961; 64 years ago
- Founder: Werner Hartmann
- Defunct: December 7, 2015
- Fate: Acquired by IDT
- Headquarters: Dresden, Germany
- Website: www.zmdi.com

Zentrum Mikroelektronik Dresden (ZMD) was regarded as the heart of East Germany's microelectronics research in the 1980s as well as its most advanced integrated circuit manufacturer. Together with TU Dresden and VEB Spurenmetalle Freiberg, ZMD formed the foundation for Silicon Saxony, a cluster of microelectronics companies that came to include new fabs by Siemens (later Infineon Technologies) and AMD (later GlobalFoundries).

== 1961: Arbeitsstelle für Molekularelektronik (AME) ==
The company was founded in 1961 in Dresden under the leadership of Werner Hartmann as a research institute with the goal of developing technologies for manufacturing integrated circuits, following the seminal patents by Jack Kilby and Robert Noyce two years earlier. Initially, it was named Arbeitsstelle für Molekularelektronik (Department of Molecular Electronics) and reported to the government's Office of Nuclear Research and Technology. In 1965 the institute was moved to the combine VVB Bauelemente und Vakuumtechnik which was responsible for manufacturing almost all electronic components in East Germany at the time. The researchers manufactured their first p–n junction in 1966, their first fully working bipolar junction transistor in 1967, and their first integrated circuit C10 (a four-input NAND gate with 7 transistors) in a 20 μm process and with a yield of 16% in April 1968. Later that year in September the test chip C30 (two four-input NAND gates, 14 transistors, equivalent to the 7400 series 7420, 10 μm process) achieved a yield of 30%. Under the designation D120C this design was later transferred for volume production to Halbleiterwerk Frankfurt (Oder) and publicly announced at the Leipzig Trade Fair in the spring of 1971, together with subsequent chips in the 7400 and 74H00 series.

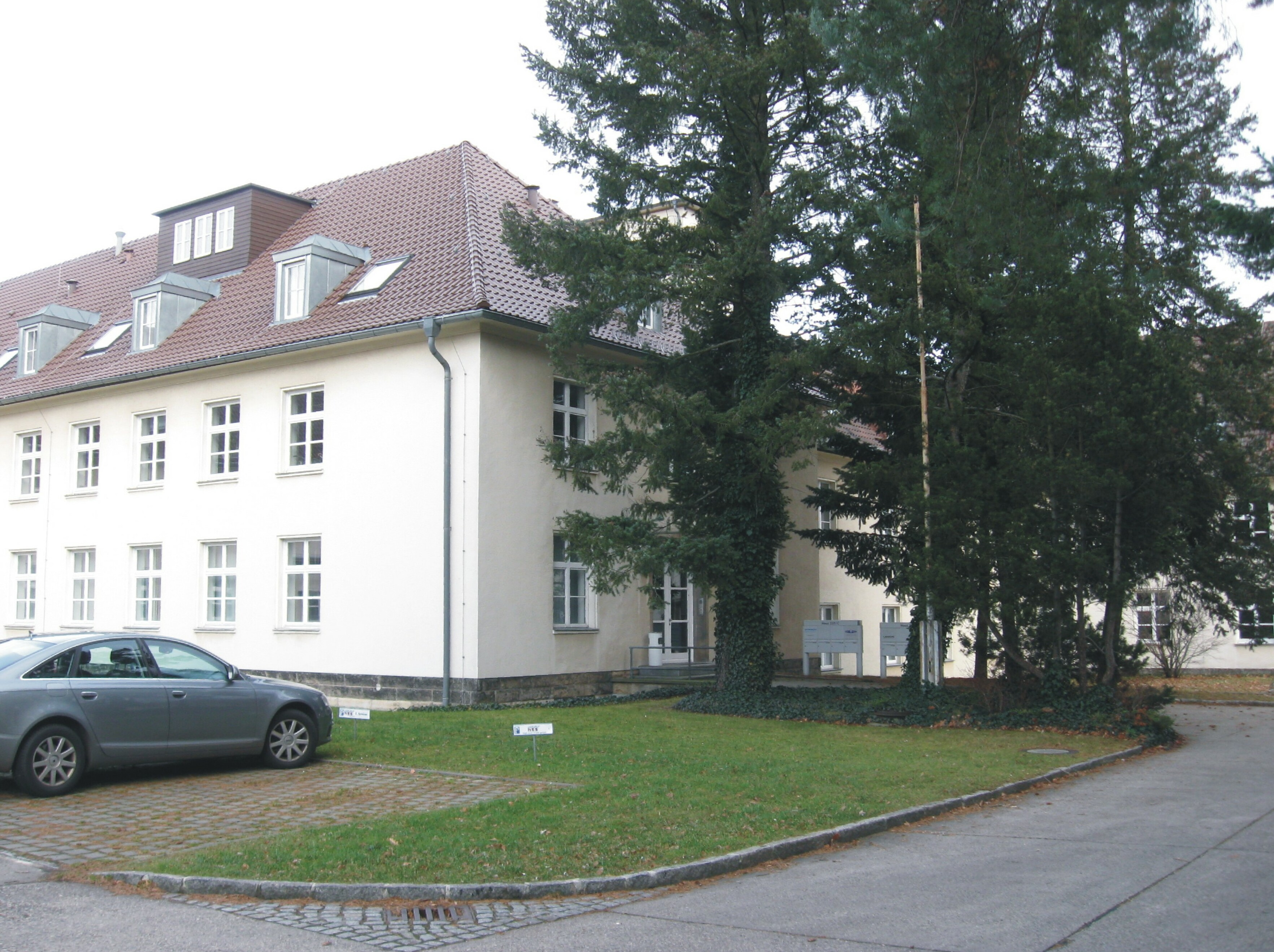
The original AME office (as it looked in 2011)

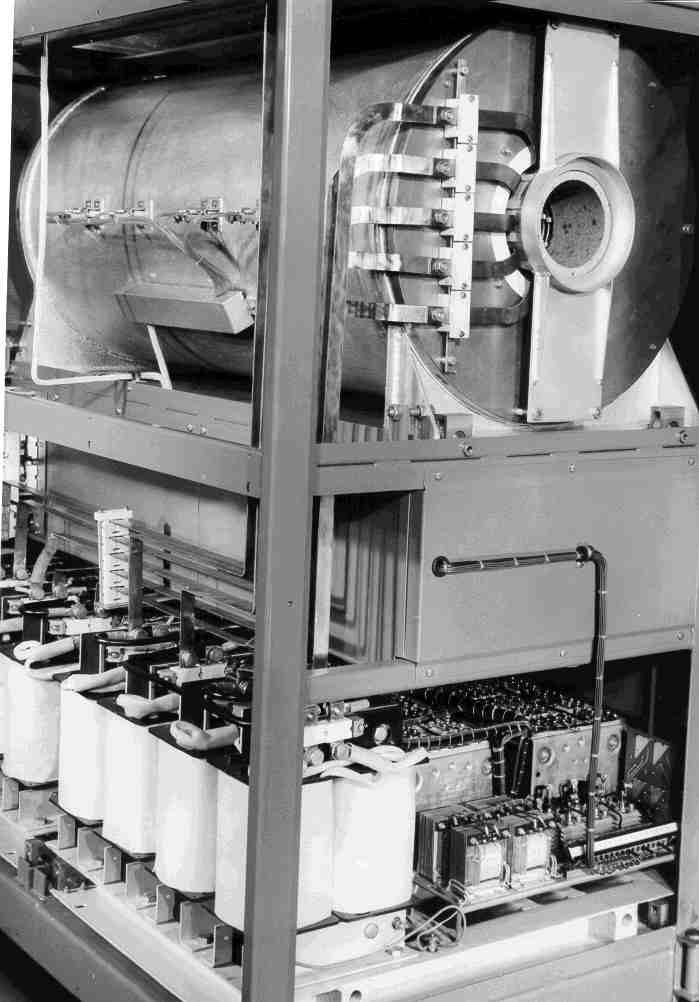
Oven for doping semiconductor materials (1965)

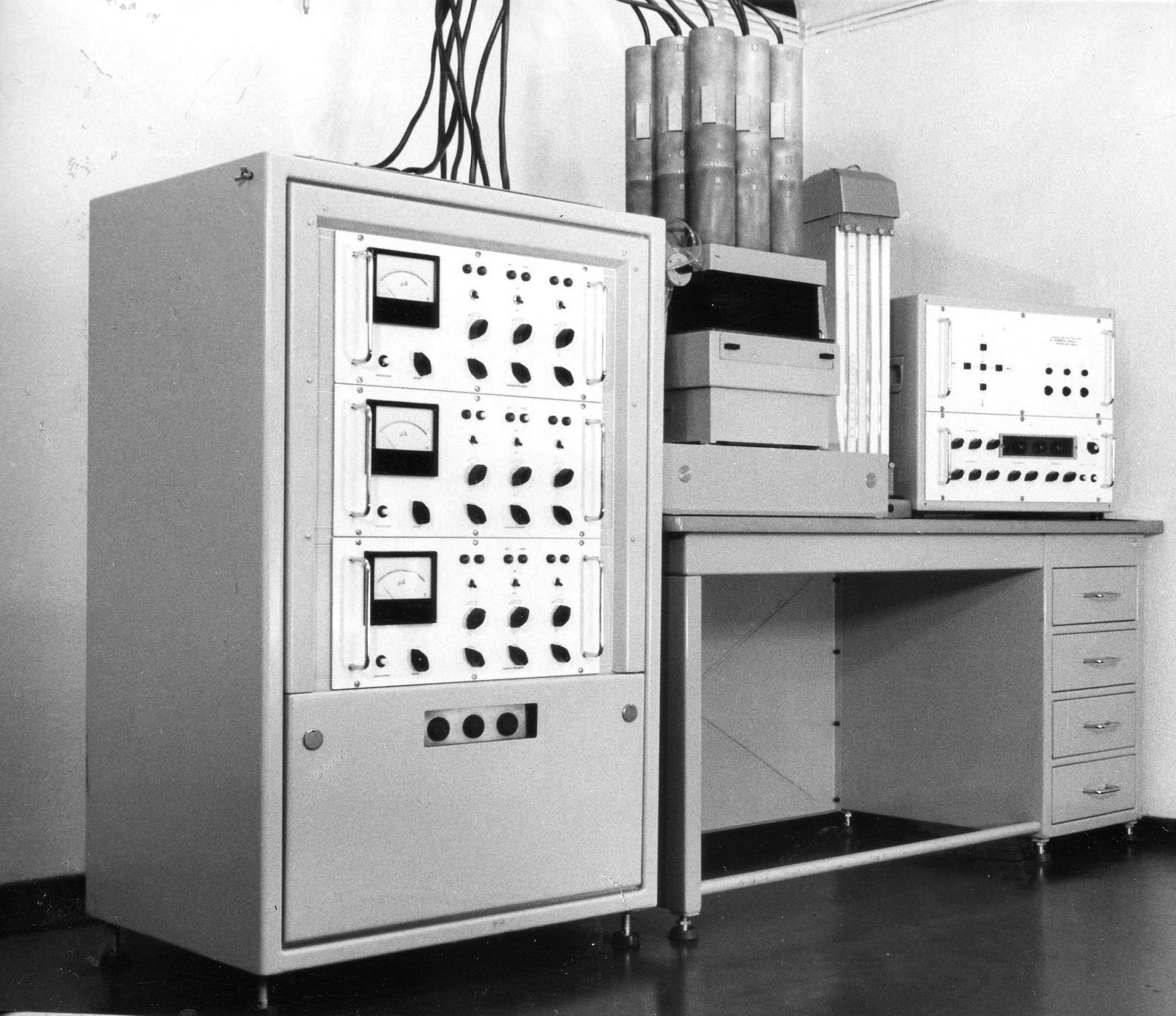
Photolithography device (1967)

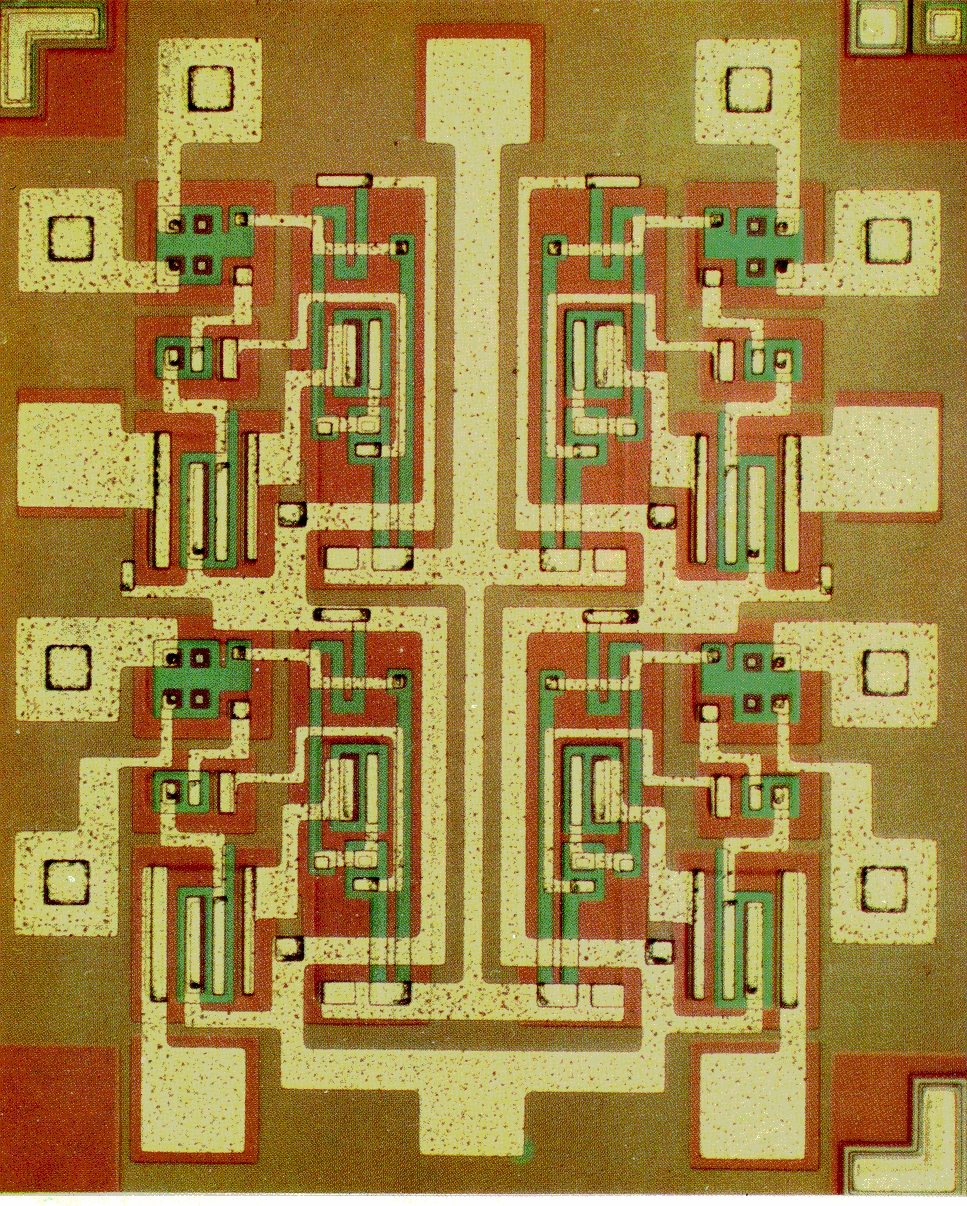
Integrated circuit C10 (1968)

== 1969: Arbeitsstelle für Molekularelektronik Dresden (AMD) ==
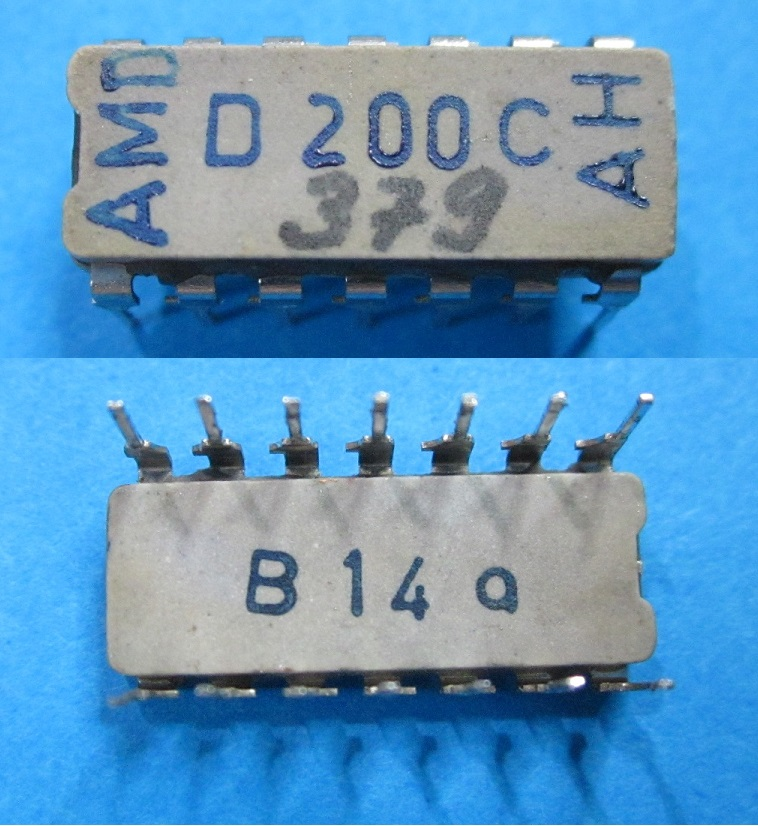
Integrated circuit D200C (equivalent to 74H00), manufactured by AMD in August 1970

In 1969 the institute was renamed to Arbeitsstelle für Molekularelektronik Dresden (AMD). This should not be confused with the other, unrelated AMD which was also founded in 1969 and under the name AMD Saxony operated in Dresden from 1996 until 2009 when that plant became part of GlobalFoundries.

When Erich Honecker replaced Walter Ulbricht as the General Secretary of the Socialist Unity Party of Germany in 1970, the new economic doctrine of the “unity of economic and social policy” led to a sharp reduction in investment in the microelectronics industry (in 1974 only 68.4% of its 1970 value). In 1973, AMD was forced to implement a "staff reduction policy". This course was reversed only in 1977.

In 1973, AMD produced the first working samples of the PMOS integrated circuit U820D for electronic calculators (6000 transistors, 6 μm process). By 1974, AMD had grown to 950 employees. Prof. Hartmann, who had led the institute since 1961, was forced to leave by the Ministry for State Security in 1974.

== 1976: Institut für Mikroelektronik Dresden (IMD) ==
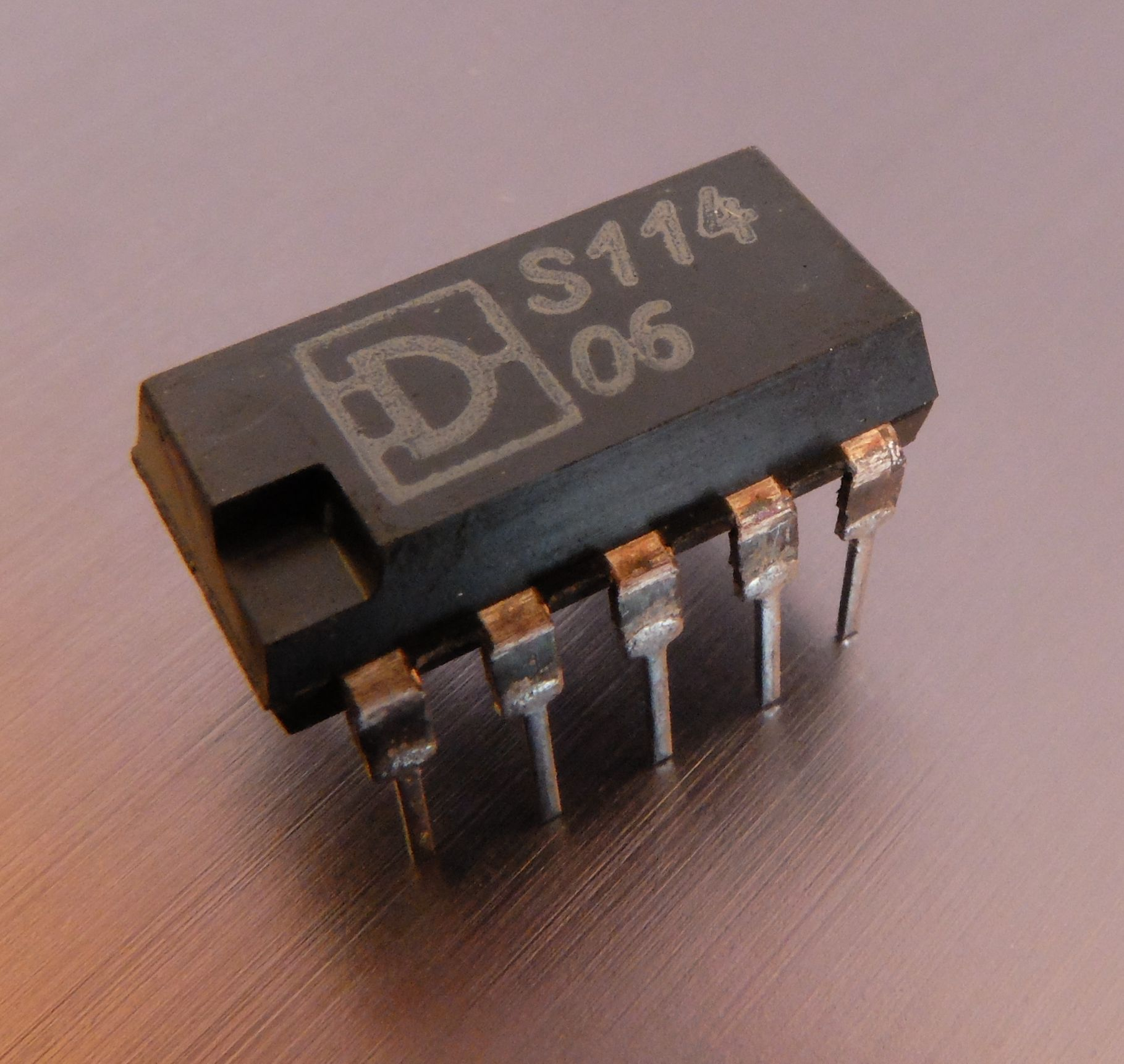
Integrated circuit with the IMD logo

The name of the institute changed again in 1976, this time to Institut für Mikroelektronik Dresden (IMD). In 1978, VVB Bauelemente und Vakuumtechnik was split into VEB Kombinat Elektronische Bauelemente Teltow for passive electronic components and VEB Kombinat Mikroelektronik Erfurt for active electronic components, IMD becoming a part of Kombinat Mikrolektronik Erfurt.

The development of dynamic RAM at IMD, that would ultimately result in the much-publicized Megabit Chip (see below), began with the 1-kilobit chip U253 (a clone of the Intel 1103). The U253 was publicly announced at the Leipzig Spring Fair 1977.

== 1980: VEB Zentrum für Forschung und Technologie Mikroelektronik (ZFTM) ==
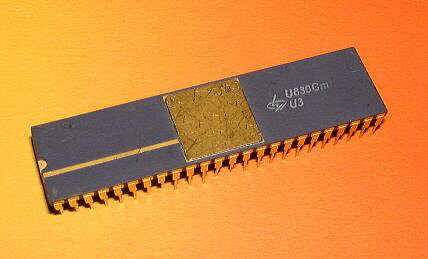
Asynchronous 8-bit processor slice U830C with the ZFTM logo

By combining Institut für Mikroelektronik with VEB Elektromat Dresden (producer of semiconductor manufacturing equipment) in 1980, ZFTM was formed. In 1986, ZFTM was moved from Kombinat Mikroelektronik Erfurt to the East German optics and technology combine Kombinat Carl Zeiss Jena.

== 1987: VEB Forschungszentrum Mikroelektronik Dresden (ZMD) ==
The development of dynamic RAM at ZMD continued with the 16-kilobit U256 and the 64-kbit U2164. First laboratory samples of the U2164 were obtained in 1981. In 1984 the U2164 was presented at the Leipzig Spring Fair. Pilot production at ZMD started in 1986. In 1988 mass production of the U2164 began at VEB Mikroelektronik "Karl Marx" Erfurt. For comparison, internationally 64-kbit chips became available commercially around 1980. The pilot production of the 256-kbit U61256 started in 1988, and the 1-Mbit U61000 followed in 1989. Neither of those two could be transferred to mass production until German Reunification in 1990. About 35,000 U61000 were manufactured in 1988 and 1989. Production of the U61256 suffered from an industrial accident in July 1989 and the yield dropped from an already low 6.1% to below 1%. The development of the megabit chip U61000 was much publicized at the time as proof of the capability of East German industry and the socialist system in general. Kombinat Carl Zeiss Jena used the U61000 to advertise its semiconductor manufacturing equipment. For this reason the U61000 bore the Carl Zeiss Jena logo while most other integrated circuits from ZMD kept the previous ZFTM logo.

Logo 1987

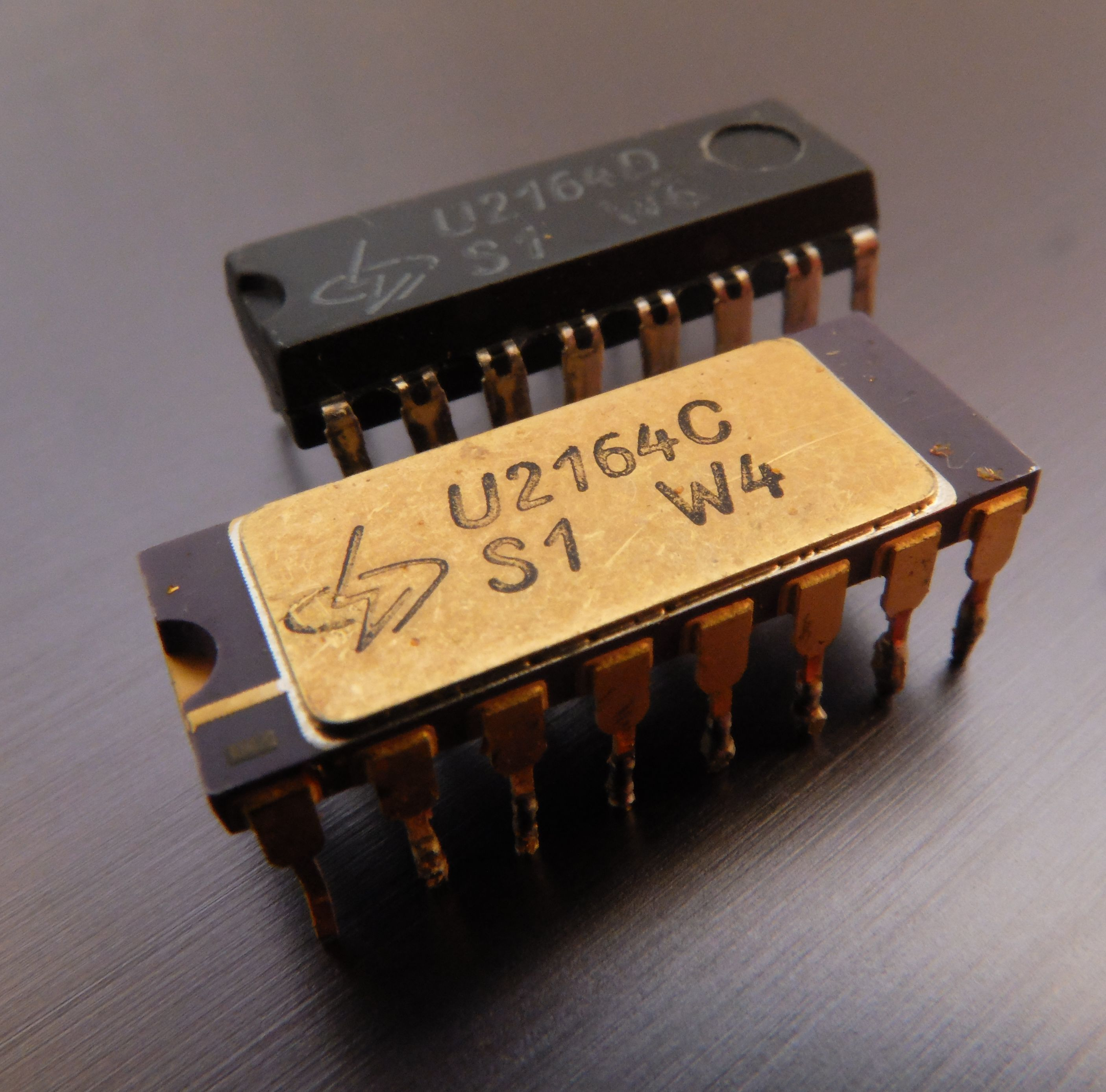
64-kbit dynamic RAM U2164C and U2164D

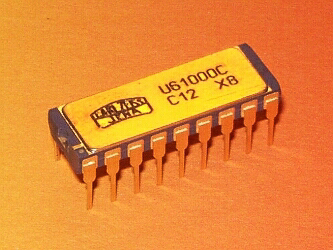
1-Mbit dynamic RAM U61000CC12

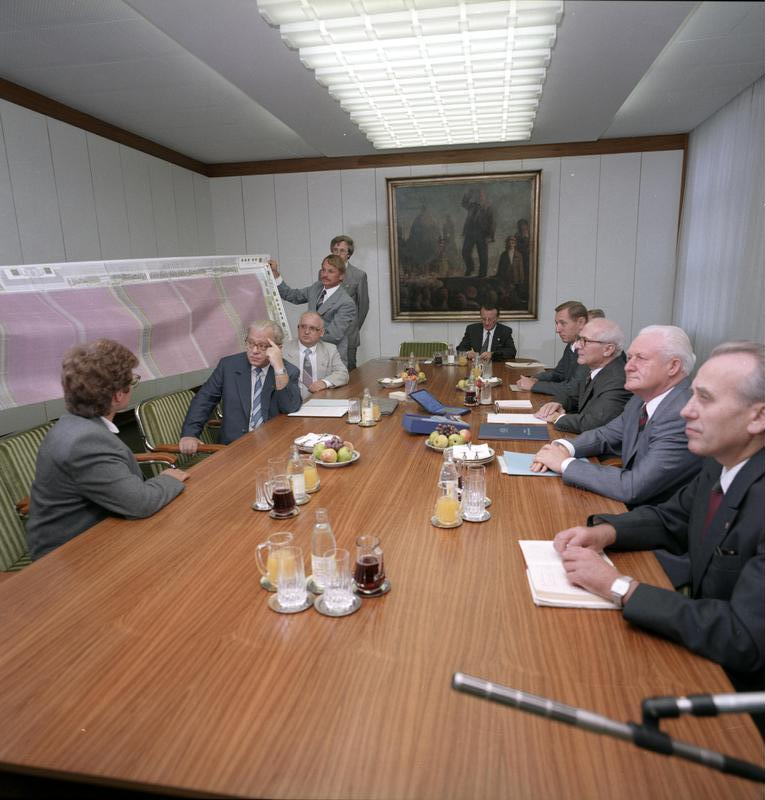
Lead developer Jens Knobloch presents a 1:300 scale drawing of the megabit chip to state leaders Erich Honecker and Günter Mittag (12 September 1988)

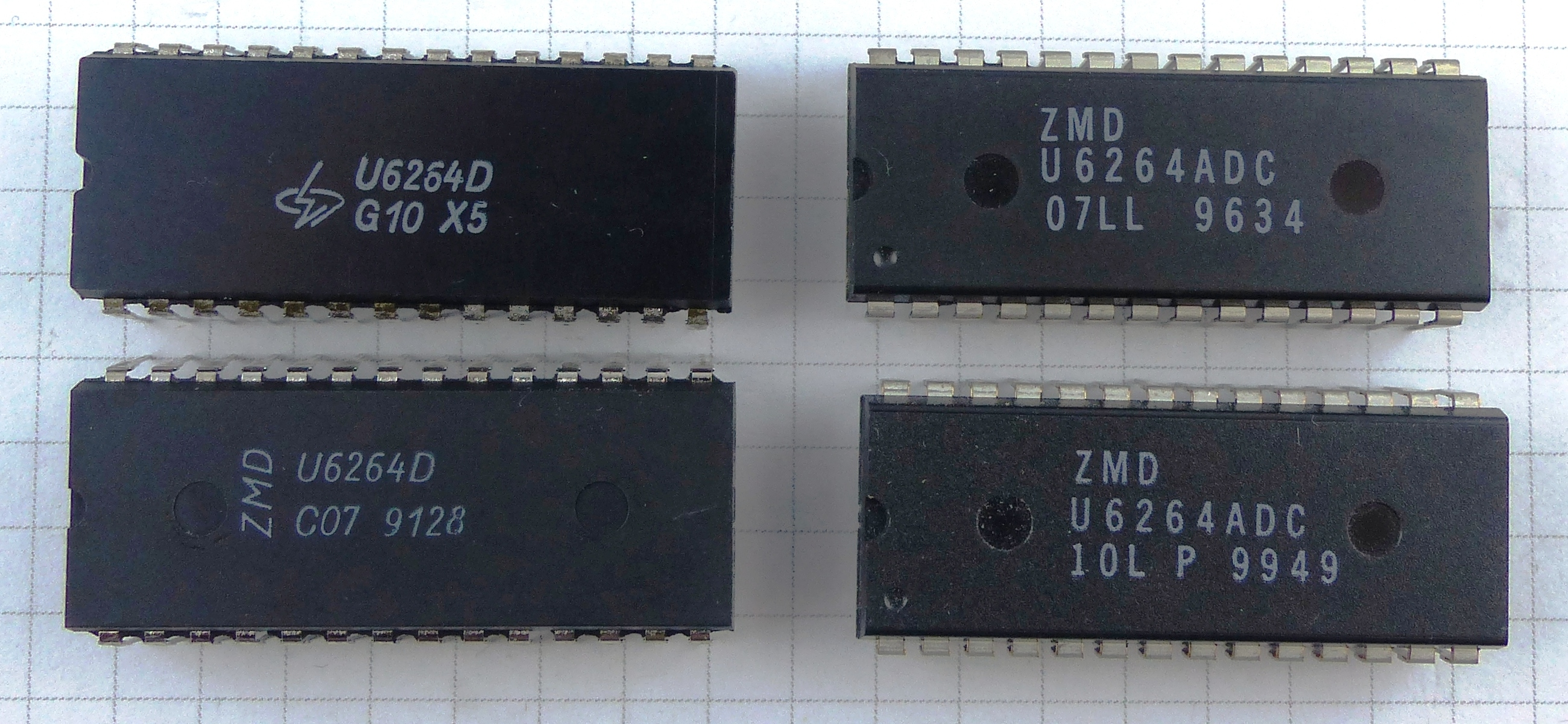
64-kbit static RAM U6264D, manufactured between 1989 and 1999

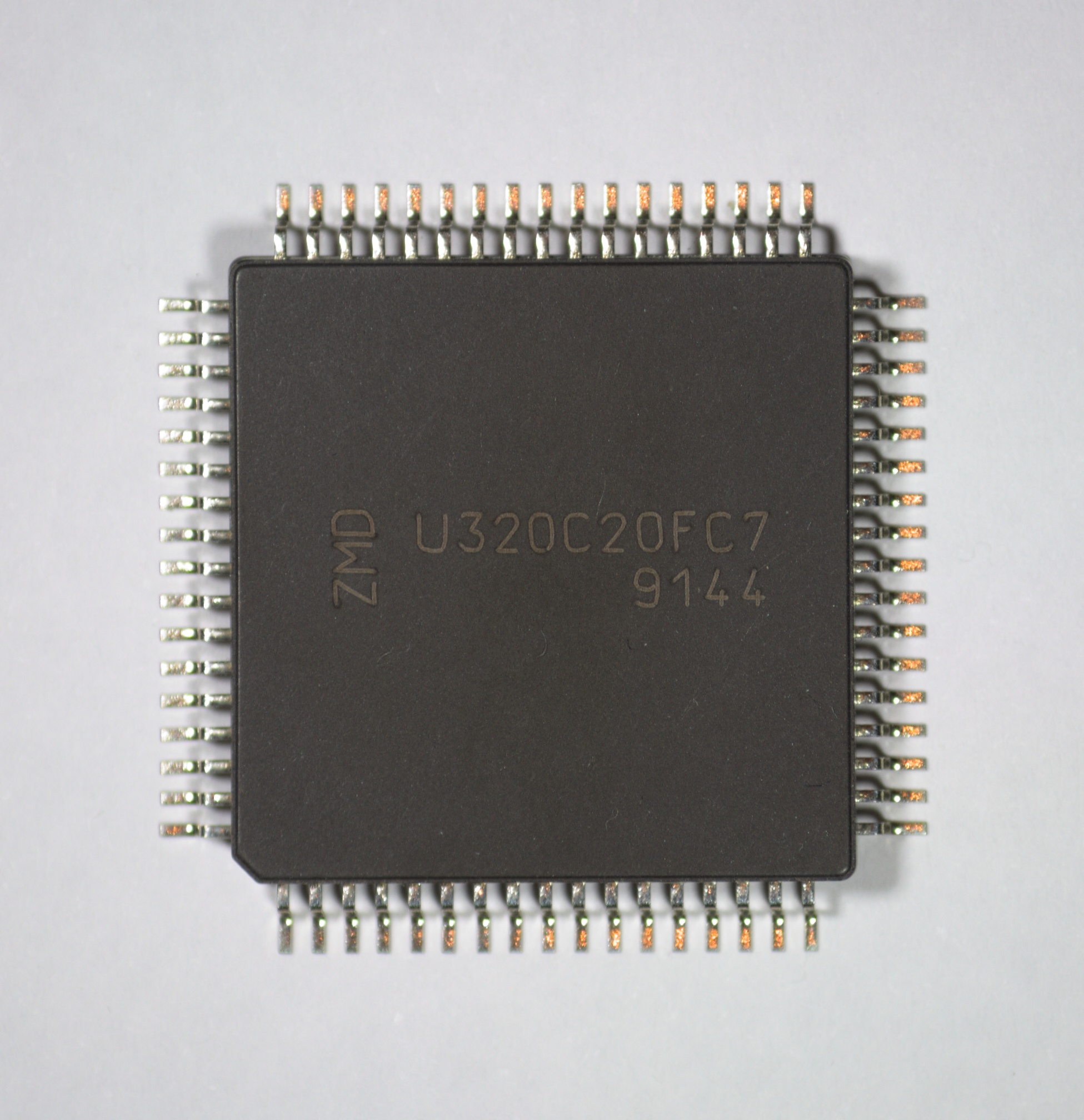
Digital signal processor U320C20, manufactured in 1991

== 1993: Zentrum Mikroelektronik Dresden GmbH (ZMD) ==
Following the German reunification in 1990, ZMD, together with other companies of the former Kombinat Mikroelektronik Erfurt, became part of a holding company under the name PTC-electronic AG which was 100% owned by the Treuhandanstalt. In 1993, ZMD was privatized as ZMD GmbH which was de facto owned by the Freestate of Saxony. The goal of the state government was to preserve ZMD as the core of the microelectronics industry in Saxony. While this goal was achieved for the industry as a whole (see Silicon Saxony), ZMD continued to accumulate losses. The number of employees fell from 575 in 1993 to 434 in 1998. In order to both avoid a bankruptcy of ZMD and further losses for the freestate, ZMD was transferred to Sachsenring AG for the symbolic price of 2 Marks in 1998.

== 2000: Zentrum Mikroelektronik Dresden AG (ZMD/ZMDI) ==
Logo of ZMDI from 2009 to 2015

In December 2001 the company changed its corporate form to Aktiengesellschaft. With the sale of its foundry to X-FAB Semiconductor Foundries AG in 2007, ZMD became a fabless semiconductor company. Since May 2009, ZMD AG used the logo ZMDI while the company name remained Zentrum Mikroelektronik Dresden.

In 2006, the company had 625 employees of which around 250 were engineers. By 2008, the numbers had shrunk to 320 employees including 150 engineers. ZMDI innovations were used in automotive and industrial electronics, medical technology and for infrared interfaces (IrDA), for example in mobile phones and laptops. The company had specialized in the design, production and marketing of heavy duty, mixed analogue-digital, application-specific circuits (ASICs) and systems on chip (SoC) with low energy consumption. The main focus of these developments were applications for the automobile sector, going back to the link with Sachsenring AG.

In December 2015 ZMDI was acquired by IDT.

== See also ==
- Electronics industry in East Germany
