= Heinz Barwich =

German nuclear physicist (1911–1966)

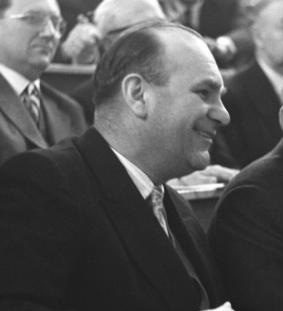
- Barwich at the German Physical Society's 1958 meeting at Karl Marx University
- Born: 22 July 1911; Berlin, German Empire
- Died: 10 April 1966 (aged 54); Cologne, West Germany
- Education: Technische Hochschule Berlin (Doktoringenieur, 1936)
- Spouse: Elfi Heinrich (m. 1960)

Heinz Barwich (22 July 1911 – 10 April 1966) was a German nuclear physicist. He was deputy director of the Siemens Research Laboratory II in Berlin. At the close of World War II, he followed the decision of Gustav Hertz, to go to the Soviet Union for ten years to work on the Soviet atomic bomb project, for which he received the Stalin Prize. He was director of the Zentralinstitut für Kernforschung (Central Institute for Nuclear Research) at Rossendorf near Dresden. For a few years he was director of the Joint Institute for Nuclear Research in Dubna, Soviet Union. In 1964 he defected to the West.

== Education ==
Barwich was born in Berlin, and began his studies in electro-technology in 1929 at the Technische Hochschule Berlin (TU Berlin) in Berlin-Charlottenburg. While there, he attended lectures of the pioneers of physics at the Friedrich-Wilhelms-Universität (today the Humboldt University of Berlin). These personalities included Hans Bethe, Albert Einstein, James Franck, Werner Heisenberg, Fritz Houtermans, Max von Laue, Lise Meitner, Erwin Schrödinger, Max Planck, Victor Weisskopf, and Eugene Wigner. By 1930, under the influence of such as these, he turned his attention to physics and mathematics. In 1936, he obtained his doctorate at TU Berlin under Nobel Laureate Gustav Hertz, who was also director of the Siemens Research Laboratory II. Barwich then joined Hertz at Siemens.

== Career ==
=== Early years ===
At the Siemens Research Laboratory II, Barwich became deputy to Hertz, who was director of the Laboratory. At that time, Hertz was a pioneer in isotope separation.

=== In the Soviet Union ===
Manfred von Ardenne, director of his private laboratory Forschungslaboratoriums für Elektronenphysik, Gustav Hertz, Nobel Laureate and director of Research Laboratory II at Siemens, Peter Adolf Thiessen, ordinarius professor at the Humboldt University of Berlin and director of the Kaiser-Wilhelm Institut für physikalische Chemie und Elektrochemie (KWIPC) in Berlin-Dahlem, and Max Volmer, ordinarius professor and director of the Physical Chemistry Institute at the Berlin Technische Hochschule, had made a pact. The pact was a pledge that whoever first made contact with the Soviets would speak for the rest. The objectives of their pact were threefold:

1. Prevent plunder of their institutes,
2. Continue their work with minimal interruption, and
3. Protect themselves from prosecution for any political acts of the past.

Before the end of World War II, Thiessen, a member of the Nationalsozialistische Deutsche Arbeiterpartei, had Communist contacts. On 27 April 1945, Thiessen arrived at von Ardenne's institute in an armored vehicle with a major of the Soviet Army, who was also a leading Soviet chemist. All four of the pact members were taken to the Soviet Union.

Hertz was made head of Institute G, in Agudseri (Agudzery), about 10 km southeast of Sukhumi and a suburb of Gul'rips (Gulrip'shi); Volmer was initially assigned to Hertz's institute. Topics assigned to Gustav Hertz's Institute G included: (1) Separation of isotopes by diffusion in a flow of inert gases, for which Gustav Hertz was the leader, (2) Development of a condensation pump, for which Justus Mühlenpfordt was the leader, and (3) Development of a theory of stability and control of a diffusion cascade, for which Barwich was the leader.

Von Ardenne was made head of Institute A, in Sinop, a suburb of Sukhumi.

In addition to Barwich's leftist political views, he stated that he was motivated to go to work in the Soviet Union as he was 33 years old, married, had three small children with a fourth on the way, and unemployed. Barwich and his family were flown to the Soviet Union on 4 August 1945.

Hertz, Barwich, and Yuri A. Krutkov worked on uranium diffusion cascade control theory. Barwich also worked with V. S. Emel'ianov. In 1946, Barwich worked out the theory of natural stability of separation cascades. His results led to a reduction in the number of compressors required and the time needed for enrichment. In October 1948, Gustav Hertz, Peter Adolf Thiessen, and Barwich were sent to a classified location to advise on problems related to the startup of the gaseous diffusion plant D-1. Because of the milk drink kefir they were served daily during their lengthy stay, they christened the place Kieferstadt (Kefirstadt); the location was Verkh-Nejvinskij, and it was known as Sverdlovsk-44 within the Soviet atomic bomb project.

In 1951, after the test of the first Soviet uranium atomic bomb, Hertz, Barwich, and Krutkov were awarded a Stalin Prize, second degree, for their work on gaseous diffusion isotope separation.

In preparation for release from the Soviet Union, it was standard practice to put personnel into quarantine for a few years if they worked on projects related to the Soviet atomic bomb project, as was the case for Barwich. Additionally, in 1954, the Deutsche Demokratische Republik (DDR, German Democratic Republic) and the Soviet Union prepared a list of scientists they wished to keep in the DDR, due to their having worked on projects related to the Soviet atomic bomb project; this list was known as the "A-list". On this A-list were the names of 18 scientists, dominated by members of the Nikolaus Riehl group, which worked at Plant No. 12 in Elektrostal'. Barwich, not a member of Riehl's group, was on the list.

=== Return to Germany ===
In April 1955, Barwich arrived in East Germany. For a short time, he was an advisor to the German Academy of Sciences and an ordinarius professor for physics at Halle University. In 1956, he became director of the Zentralinstitut für Kernforschung (ZfK, Central Institute for Nuclear Research) and ordinarius professor at the Technische Hochschule Dresden. At the ZfK, Barwich's main objectives were to build and put into operation the first nuclear reactor of the German Democratic Republic (GDR), which was purchased from the Soviet Union, and to establish a research institute. The reactor went into operation in 1957. In 1959, the former Soviet spy Klaus Fuchs was released from a British prison and was appointed Barwich's deputy at the ZfK.

Barwich became a member of the atomic energy commission which reported to the Socialist Unity Party Central Committee, a member of the Council for the Peaceful Use of Atomic Energy, and a member of the GDR Research Council. His scientific contributions were recognized by the GDR's National Prize, second class. He was also appointed to the Council of Scholars of the Joint Institute for Nuclear Research (Объединённый институт ядерных исследований, OIYaI) in Dubna, Soviet Union.

In May 1961, Barwich left Dresden to become deputy director of the OIYaI. He thus became the superior of the former Soviet spy Bruno Pontecorvo, who had fled to the Soviet Union in 1950. While Barwich was gone, Fuchs ran the ZfK. In June 1964, Barwich returned to East Germany and resumed the directorship of the ZfK in July.

On 6 September 1964, just before the first Chinese atomic test, Barwich defected to the West, while at the Third Atoms for Peace Conference in Geneva; he had met many of the Chinese atomic scientists while at Dubna. The same day, his wife went from East Berlin to West Berlin. While trying to defect his son Peter and his daughter Beate were arrested by GDR border police and after this sentenced to several years imprisonment. Later they were freed following a deal between GDR and West Germany. In December 1964, Barwich testified before the United States Senate Subcommittee on Internal Security.

Barwich died in Cologne, aged 54.

== Personal ==
Barwich was married twice. By 1948, while he and his first wife were in the Soviet Union, they were living apart. They divorced in 1955, after he arrived in East Germany. In 1960, he married Elfi Heinrich, who was considerably younger than himself and was a Russian language interpreter at the ZfK. He had four children with his first wife, a son and three daughters.

== Books ==
- Heinz Barwich and Brunolf Baade Die Zukunft gehört dem Sozialismus (Nationale Front d. Demokrat. Deutschland, Nationalrat, Büro d. Präsidiums, 1957)
- Heinz Barwich, Josef Schintlmeister, and Fritz Thümmler Das Zentralinstitut für Kernphysik am Beginn seiner Arbeit (Akademie-Verl., 1958)
- Heinz Barwich and Gustav Hertz Lehrbuch der Kernphysik. Bd. 3. Angewandte Kernphysik (Teubner in Verwaltung, 1963)
- Heinz Barwich and Elfi Barwich Das rote Atom; Als deutscher Wissenschaftler im Geheimkreis der russischen Kernphysik (Scherz, 1967) (Europ. Buch- u. Phonoklub, 1969) (Fischer-Bücherei, 1970) (Fischer-TB.-Vlg., Ffm, 1984)
