= High value resistors (electronics) =

High value resistors (HVR) are electronic components used for special applications, such as in bio-medical systems, measurement equipment and some condenser microphones. While discrete resistors in the range of few tens of megohm are very common, making giga-ohm range resistors is more complicated. Discrete resistors are available up to several tera-ohms, but are expensive because of limited demand. Sometimes, a combination of active and passive electronic devices is used to achieve such a high resistance.
