= U61000 =

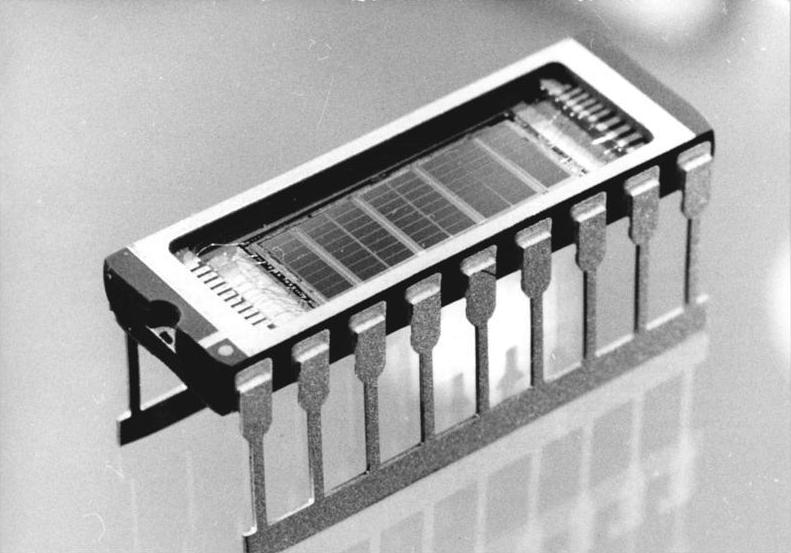
U61000D

U61000 was the first 1-Mbit DRAM microchip produced in the German Democratic Republic by Zentrum Mikroelektronik Dresden in September 1988 based on CMOS technology.

- size: 12.60 mm x 4.53 mm
- DRAM organisation: 1024k x 1 Bit
- access time: 100 ns - 120 ns

The first step in the project was to develop the chip, this was called U61000-1. After the design and technology were optimized, the U61000-2.1 was created. The final version for production was called U61000-2.2.

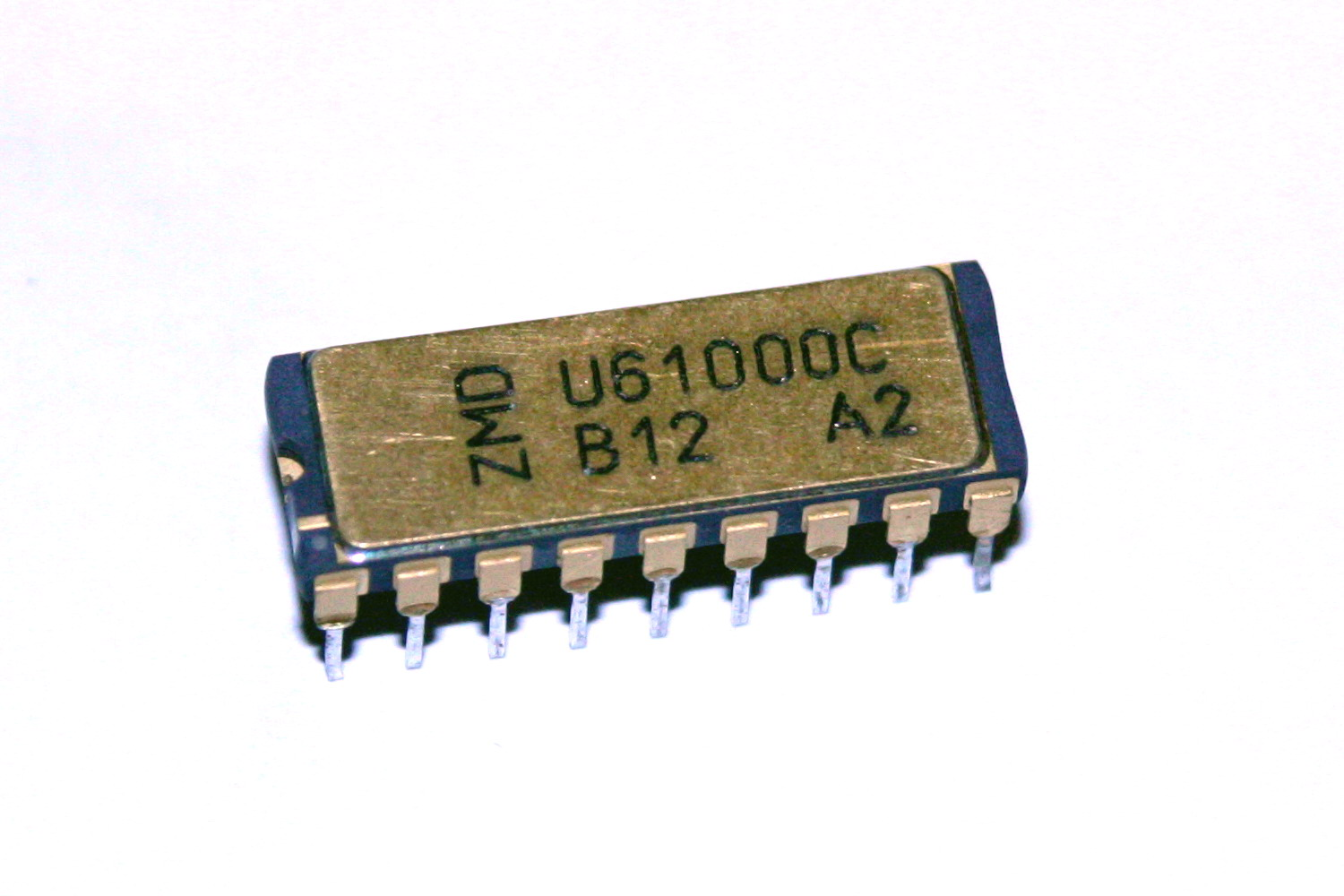
U61000C chip

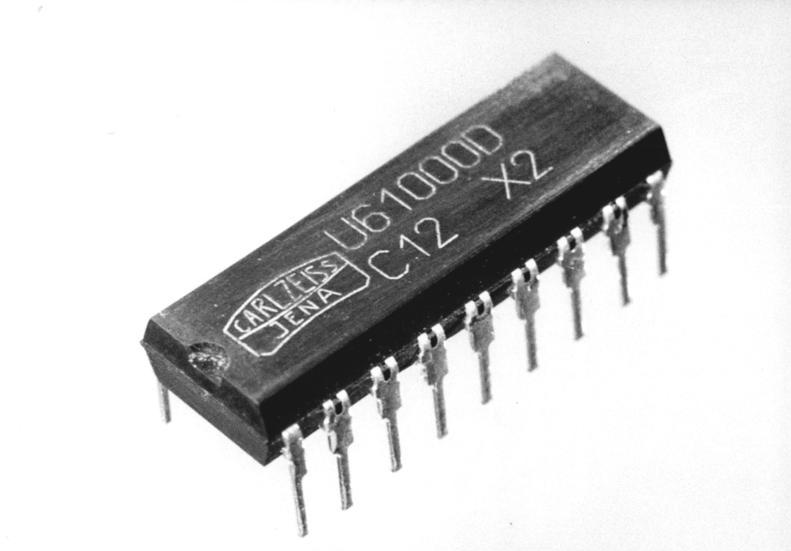
U61000D

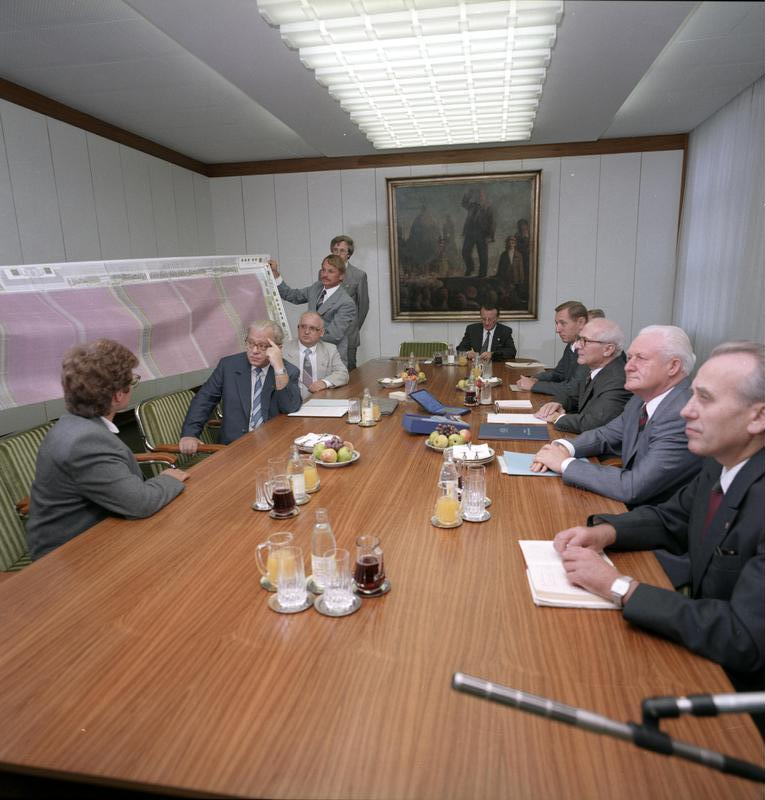
Presentation of the first U61000 chip to Chairman Honecker (1988)
