= Salomon Oppenheim =

German-Jewish banker

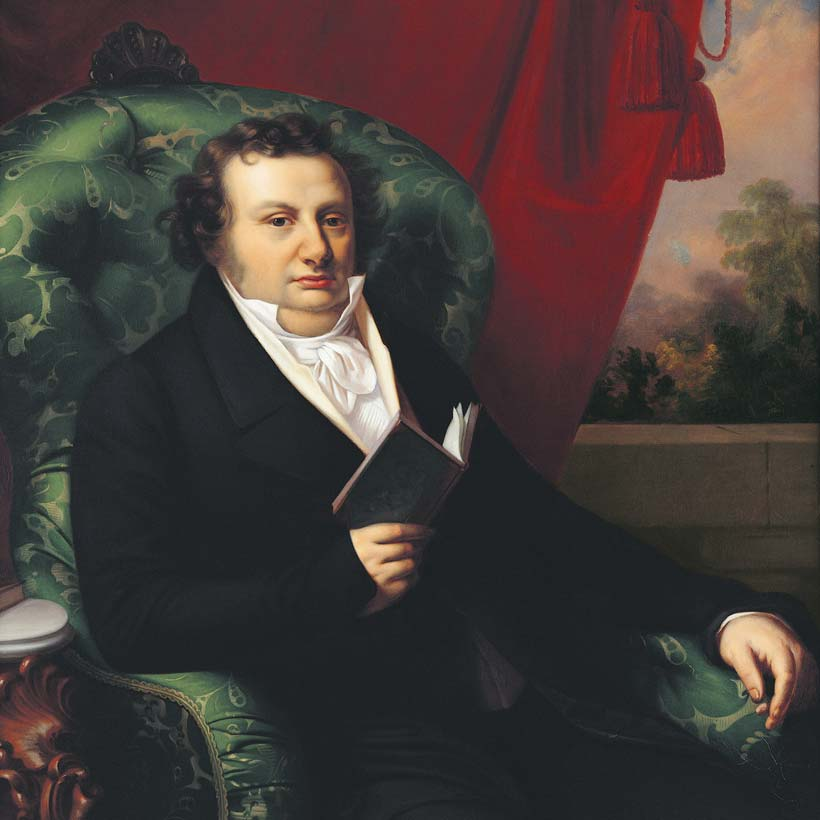
- Salomon Oppenheim Jr.
- Born: 19 June 1772; Bonn, Holy Roman Empire
- Died: 8 November 1828 (aged 56); Mainz, German Confederation
- Occupation: Banker

Salomon Oppenheim Jr. (19 June 1772 – 8 November 1828) was a German Jewish banker, and the founder of the Sal. Oppenheim private bank.

He was born in Bonn, the scion of an illustrious family of "Court Jews" (German: Hofjuden) who had served as advisers and moneylenders to the Prince-Archbishops of Cologne in the Rhineland area for several generations. In 1789, at the age of 17, he set up a small commissions and exchange house in Bonn, then the residence of Prince-Archbishop Maximilian Francis of Austria. He made the acquaintance of Ludwig van Beethoven during his life and they became lifelong friends.

Nine years later, after French troops had occupied the left banks of the Rhine, Oppenheim moved to the city of Cologne. He was one of the first Jews who settled in Cologne since the expulsion of the Jewish community in 1424. Oppenheim became banker and tax collector by order of the French occupying power. After the establishment of the Province of Jülich-Cleves-Berg in 1815, he took service with the Prussian state. In January 1822, he received the title of "Senior Court Agent in our Most Gracious Confidence".

Oppenheim and his wife Therese (Stein, born Deigen Levi) had 12 children. After Salomon's death, two of his sons, Simon and Abraham, took over management of the bank. Another son, Dagobert co-published the Rheinische Zeitung and was a railway industrialist. Salomon and Therese's daughter Bertha "Betty" Hertz née Oppenheim married Heinrich David Hertz (born as Hertz Hertz)—their son Gustav Ferdinand Hertz (born as David Gustav Hertz) with his wife Anna Elisabeth née Pfefferkorn later became parents of Heinrich Rudolf Hertz and Gustav Theodor Hertz, who in turn later became the father of Gustav Ludwig Hertz.

The main branches of the family converted to Protestantism (Betty Oppenheim and Heinrich David Hertz, and Simon Oppenheim's son Eduard) and Catholicism (Abraham's son Albert) in the late 19th century.

The company he founded, Sal. Oppenheim, is now a subsidiary of Deutsche Bank. Participation of the Oppenheim family effectively ended in 2005 with the death of Alfred Freiherr von Oppenheim. It moved its headquarters to Luxembourg in 2007 and was acquired by Deutsche Bank in 2009/10.

== Literature ==
- Gabriele Teichmann (1999). "Oppenheim, Salomon junior Freiherr von". Neue Deutsche Biographie (in German). Vol. 19. Berlin: Duncker & Humblot. pp. 560–561. (full text online).

== See also ==
- Oppenheim family
