= Hans Hertz =

Swedish physicist (born 1955)

- Born: 22 August 1955 (age 71); Lund, Sweden
- Education: Lund University
- Known for: metal-jet-anode microfocus X-ray tube
- Scientific career
- Fields: Physics
- Workplaces: Lund University; KTH Royal Institute of Technology
- Doctoral advisor: Sune Svanberg

Notes
- Son of Carl Hellmuth Hertz, co-inventor of echocardiography Grandson of Gustav Ludwig Hertz, Nobel Prize laureate in Physics for his work on inelastic electron collisions in gases.

Hans Martin Hertz, born 22 August 1955, is a Swedish physicist and professor at KTH Royal Institute of Technology.

== Biography ==
Hertz was born in Lund, Sweden, to Carl Hellmuth Hertz and his wife Birgit Nordbring. He is the grandson of Gustav Ludwig Hertz and the great great nephew of Heinrich Hertz. His father was a professor in Physics at Lund University and his mother was a professor in microbial ecology.

Hertz studied Engineering physics and received his doctorate in Atomic physics from Lund University 1988. After a postdoc at Stanford University he returned to Lund to create his own research group. In 1997 Hertz was appointed professor in biomedical physics at KTH Royal Institute of Technology in Stockholm. Between December 2013 and June 2018 he was Chair of the Board of MAX IV, the first 4th generation synchrotron in the world.

Hertz was elected member of the Royal Swedish Academy of Sciences in 2007 and the Royal Swedish Academy of Engineering Sciences in 2008. In 2016, he was nominated to the prestigious Polhem Prize together with his former doctoral student Oscar Hemberg for their invention of Liquid-metal-jet sources.

== Research ==
Hertz has worked on cell manipulation with ultrasound, development of laboratory sources for Soft x-ray microscopy, and X-ray microfocus sources. The last research topic evolved into the Liquid-metal-jet source which is an order of magnitude brighter than conventional X-ray tubes. This is useful in techniques such as Phase-contrast X-ray imaging, Small-angle X-ray scattering, and X-ray crystallography.
