= James Franck =

German–American physicist (1882–1964)

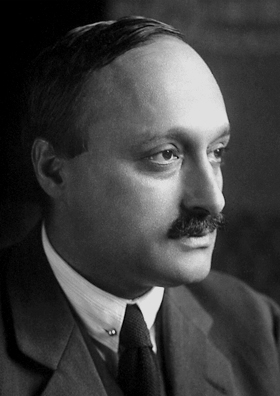
- Franck in 1925
- Born: 26 August 1882; Hamburg, German Empire
- Died: 21 May 1964 (aged 81); Göttingen, West Germany
- Citizenship: Germany; United States (nat. 1941)
- Education: University of Berlin (PhD, DSc)
- Known for: Franck–Hertz experiment; Franck–Condon principle; Franck Report
- Spouses: Ingrid Josefson (m. 1911; died 1942) Hertha Sponer (m. 1946)
- Children: 2
- Awards: Nobel Prize in Physics (1925); Max Planck Medal (1951); Rumford Prize (1955)
- Scientific career
- Fields: Physics
- Workplaces: University of Berlin; Kaiser Wilhelm Society; University of Göttingen; University of Copenhagen; Johns Hopkins University; University of Chicago
- Thesis: Über die Beweglichkeit der Ladungsträger der Spitzenentladung (1906)
- Doctoral advisor: Emil Warburg
- Doctoral students: See list: Robert d'Escourt Atkinson; Wilhelm Hanle; Arthur R. von Hippel; Fritz Houtermans; Hans Kopfermann; Heinrich Gerhard Kuhn; Heinz Maier-Leibnitz; Theodore Puck; Herbert Arthur Stuart; John Torrence Tate Sr.
- Military career
- Allegiance: German Empire
- Branch: German Army
- Service years: 1914–1918
- Ranks: Offizierstellvertreter; Leutnant
- Wars: World War I; Western Front; Eastern Front
- Awards: Iron Cross (2nd Class, 1915; 1st Class, 1918); Hanseatic Cross (1916)

James Franck (German: [ˈdʒɛɪ̯ms ˈfʁaŋk]; 26 August 1882 – 21 May 1964) was a German–American physicist who shared the 1925 Nobel Prize in Physics with Gustav Hertz "for their discovery of the laws governing the impact of an electron upon an atom."

Franck completed his doctorate in 1906 and his habilitation in 1911 at the Frederick William University in Berlin, where he lectured and taught until 1918, having reached the position of professor extraordinarius. He served as a volunteer in the German Army during World War I. He was seriously injured in 1917 in a gas attack and was awarded the Iron Cross 1st Class.

Franck became the head of the physics division of the Kaiser Wilhelm Gesellschaft for Physical Chemistry. In 1920, Franck became professor ordinarius of experimental physics and Director of the Second Institute for Experimental Physics at the University of Göttingen. While there he worked on quantum physics with Max Born, who was Director of the Institute of Theoretical Physics. His work included the Franck–Hertz experiment, an important confirmation of the Bohr model of the atom. He promoted the careers of women in physics, notably Lise Meitner, Hertha Sponer, and Hilde Levi.

After the Nazi Party came to power in Germany in 1933, Franck resigned from his position at the University of Göttingen in protest against the dismissal of fellow colleagues. He assisted Frederick Lindemann in helping dismissed Jewish scientists find work overseas, before he left Germany in November. After a year at the Niels Bohr Institute in Denmark, he moved to the United States, where he worked at Johns Hopkins University in Baltimore and then the University of Chicago. During this period he became interested in photosynthesis.

Franck participated in the Manhattan Project during World War II as director of the chemistry division of the Metallurgical Laboratory. He was also the Chairman of the Committee on Political and Social Problems regarding the atomic bomb, which is best known for the compilation of the Franck Report, which recommended that the atomic bombs not be used on the Japanese cities without warning.

== Education ==
James Franck was born on 26 August 1882 in Hamburg, German Empire, into a Jewish family, the second child and first son of Rebecca Nachum (née Drucker) and Jacob Franck, a banker. He had an older sister, Paula, and a younger brother, Robert. His father was a devout and religious man, while his mother came from a family of rabbis.

In 1891, Franck enrolled at the Wilhelm-Gymnasium in Hamburg, which was then a boys-only school. Hamburg had no university then, so prospective students had to attend one of the 22 universities elsewhere in Germany. Intending to study law and economics, In 1901, Franck entered the University of Heidelberg, as it had a renowned law school. He attended lectures on law, but was far more interested in those on science. While there, he met Max Born, who would become a lifelong friend. With Born's help, he was able to persuade his parents to allow him to switch to studying physics and chemistry. He attended mathematics lectures by Leo Königsberger and Georg Cantor, but Heidelberg was not strong on the physical sciences, so he decided to go to the University of Berlin.

At Berlin, Franck attended lectures by Max Planck and Emil Warburg. For his Ph.D., Warburg suggested that he study corona discharges. He found this topic too complex, so he changed the focus of his thesis. Titled Über die Beweglichkeit der Ladungsträger der Spitzenentladung (On the mobility of ions), it would subsequently be published in Annalen der Physik.

With his thesis completed, Franck had to perform his deferred military service. He was called up on 1 October 1906 and joined the 1st Telegraph Battalion. He suffered a minor horse riding accident in December and was discharged as unfit for duty. He took up an assistantship at the Physikalische Verein in Frankfurt in 1907, but did not enjoy it, and soon returned to the University of Berlin. At a concert, he met Ingrid Josefson, a Swedish pianist. They were married in a Swedish ceremony in Gothenburg on 23 December 1907. They had two daughters: Dagmar "Daggie", who was born in 1909; and Elisabeth "Lisa", who was born in 1912.

To pursue an academic career in Germany, having a doctorate was not enough; one needed a venia legendi, or habilitation. This could be achieved with either another major thesis or by producing a substantial body of published work. Franck chose the latter route. There were many unsolved problems in physics at the time, and by 1914 he had published 34 articles. He was the sole author of some, but generally preferred working in collaboration with Eva von Bahr, Lise Meitner, Robert Pohl, Peter Pringsheim, Robert W. Wood, Arthur Wehnelt, and Wilhelm Westphal. His most fruitful collaboration was with Gustav Hertz, with whom he wrote 19 articles. He received his habilitation on 20 May 1911.

== Franck–Hertz experiment ==
Anode current (arbitrary units) versus grid voltage (relative to the cathode). This graph is based on the original 1914 paper by Franck and Hertz.

In 1914, Franck teamed up with Hertz to perform an experiment to investigate fluorescence. They designed a vacuum tube for studying energetic electrons that flew through a thin vapour of mercury atoms. They discovered that when an electron collided with a mercury atom it could lose only a specific quantity (4.9 electronvolts) of its kinetic energy before flying away. A faster electron does not decelerate completely after a collision, but loses precisely the same amount of its kinetic energy. Slower electrons just bounce off mercury atoms without losing any significant speed or kinetic energy.

These experimental results provided confirmation of Albert Einstein's photoelectric effect and Planck's relation (E = fh) linking energy (E) and frequency (f) arising from quantisation of energy with the Planck constant (h). But they also provided evidence supporting the model of the atom that had been proposed the previous year by Niels Bohr. Its key feature was that an electron inside an atom occupies one of the atom's "quantum energy levels". Before a collision, an electron inside the mercury atom occupies its lowest available energy level. After the collision, the electron inside occupies a higher energy level with 4.9 eV more energy. This means that the electron is more loosely bound to the mercury atom. There were no intermediate levels or possibilities.

In a second paper presented in May 1914, Franck and Hertz reported on the light emission by the mercury atoms that had absorbed energy from collisions. They showed that the wavelength of this ultraviolet light corresponded exactly to the 4.9 eV of energy that the flying electron had lost. The relationship of energy and wavelength had also been predicted by Bohr. Franck and Hertz completed their last paper together in December 1918. In it, they reconciled the discrepancies between their results and Bohr's theory, which they now acknowledged. In his Nobel lecture, Franck admitted that it was "completely incomprehensible that we had failed to recognise the fundamental significance of Bohr's theory, so much so, that we never even mentioned it once". On 10 December 1926, Franck and Hertz were awarded the 1925 Nobel Prize in Physics "for their discovery of the laws governing the impact of an electron upon an atom".

== World War I ==
Franck enlisted in the German Army soon after the outbreak of the First World War in August 1914. In December, he was sent to the Picardy sector of the Western Front. He became a deputy officer (offizierstellvertreter), and then a lieutenant (leutnant) in 1915. In early 1915, he was transferred to Fritz Haber's new unit that would introduce clouds of chlorine gas as a weapon. With Otto Hahn, he was responsible for locating sites for the attacks. He was awarded the Iron Cross, Second Class, on 30 March 1915, and the city of Hamburg awarded him the Hanseatic Cross on 11 January 1916. While in hospital with pleurisy, he co-wrote yet another scientific paper with Hertz, and he was appointed an assistant professor in his absence by Frederick William University on 19 September 1916. Sent to the Russian front, he came down with dysentery. He returned to Berlin, where he joined Hertz, Westphal, Hans Geiger, Hahn, and others at Haber's Kaiser Wilhelm Institute for Physical Chemistry and Electrochemistry, working on the development of gas masks. He was awarded the Iron Cross, First Class, on 23 February 1918. He was discharged from the army on 25 November 1918, soon after the war ended.

With the war over, Haber's Kaiser Wilhelm Institute now returned to research, and Haber offered Franck a job. His new post came with more pay, but was not a tenured position. It did however allow him to pursue his research as he wished. Working with new, younger collaborators such as Walter Grotrian, Paul Knipping, Thea Krüger, Fritz Reiche, and Hertha Sponer, his first papers at the Kaiser Wilhelm Institute examined atomic electrons in their excited state, results that would later prove important in the development of the laser. They coined the term metastable for atoms spending an extended time in a state other than that of least energy. When Niels Bohr visited Berlin in 1920, Meitner and Franck arranged for him to come to the Kaiser Wilhelm Institute to talk with the younger staff without the presence of the bonzen (bigwigs).

== Career in Göttingen ==
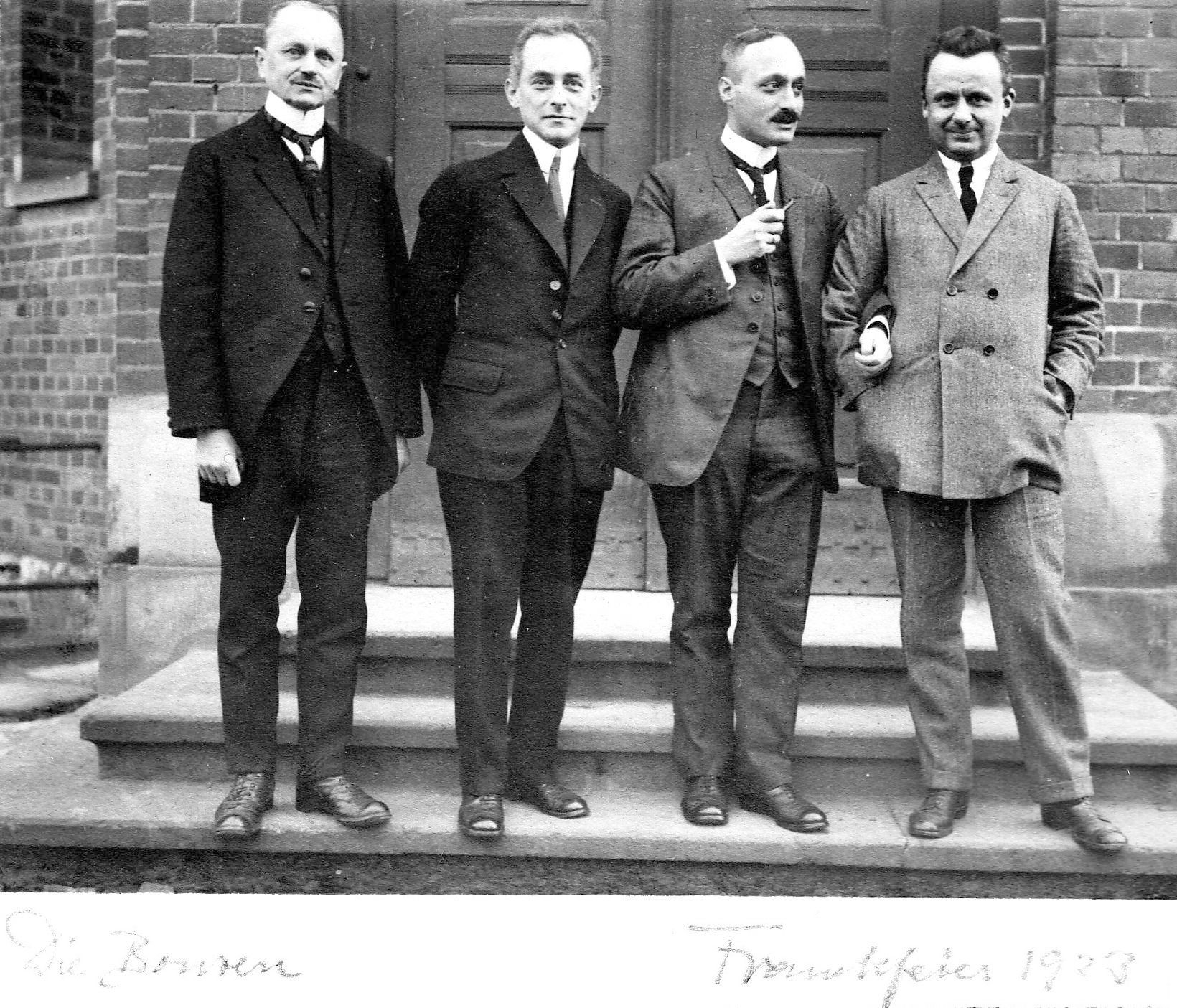
Left to right: Max Reich, Max Born, James Franck, and Robert Pohl (the bonzen) in 1923

In 1920, the University of Göttingen offered Max Born its Chair of Theoretical Physics, which had recently been vacated by Peter Debye. Göttingen was an important centre for mathematics, thanks to David Hilbert, Felix Klein, Hermann Minkowski, and Carl Runge, but not so much for physics. This would change. As part of his price for coming to Göttingen, Born wanted Franck to head experimental physics there. On 15 November 1920, he became Professor of Experimental Physics and Director of the Second Institute for Experimental Physics, a fully tenured professor ordinarius. He was allowed two assistants, so he brought Hertha Sponer with him from Berlin to fill one of the positions, and Pohl, a gifted teacher, headed the First Institute and handled the lectures. He refurbished the laboratory with the latest equipment using funds from his own pocket.

Under Born and Franck, Göttingen was one of the world's great centres for physics from 1920 to 1933. Although they published only three papers together, Born and Franck discussed every one of their papers with each other. Gaining admittance to Franck's laboratory became highly competitive. His doctoral students included Hans Kopfermann, Arthur R. von Hippel, Wilhelm Hanle, Fritz Houtermans, Heinrich Kuhn, and Heinz Maier-Leibnitz. In supervising doctoral candidates, he had to ensure that thesis topics were well-defined, and would teach the candidate how to conduct original research, while still staying within the limits of the candidate's ability, the laboratory's equipment and the institute's budget. Under his direction, research was carried out into the structure of atoms and molecules.

In his own research, Franck developed what became known as the Franck–Condon principle, a rule in spectroscopy and quantum chemistry that explains the intensity of vibronic transitions, simultaneous changes in electronic and vibrational energy levels of a molecule due to the absorption or emission of a photon of the appropriate energy. The principle states that during an electronic transition, a change from one vibrational energy level to another will be more likely to happen if the two vibrational wave functions overlap more significantly. The principle has since been applied to a wide variety of related phenomena.

== Middle life ==
This period came to an end when the Nazi Party won power in Germany in an election on 5 March 1933. The following month, it enacted the Law for the Restoration of the Professional Civil Service, which provided for the retirement or dismissal of all Jewish civil servants, along with political opponents of the government. As a veteran of the First World War, Franck was exempt, but he submitted his resignation anyway on 17 April 1933. He once commented that science was his god and nature was his religion. He did not require his daughters to attend religious instruction classes at school, and even let them have a decorated tree at Christmas; but he was proud of his Jewish heritage all the same. He was the first academic to resign in protest over the law. Newspapers around the world reported it, but no government or university protested.

Franck assisted Frederick Lindemann in helping dismissed Jewish scientists find work overseas, before he left Germany in November 1933. After a brief visit to the United States, where he measured the absorption of light in heavy water with Wood at Johns Hopkins University, he took up a position at the Niels Bohr Institute in Copenhagen. He needed a new collaborator, so he took on Hilde Levi, whose recent thesis had impressed him. His original intention was to continue his research into the fluorescence of vapours and liquids, but under Bohr's influence they began to take an interest in biological aspects of these reactions, particularly photosynthesis, the process by which plants use light to convert carbon dioxide and water into more organic compounds. Biological processes turned out to be far more complicated than simple reactions in atoms and molecules. He co-authored two papers with Levi on the subject, which he would return to over the following years.

Franck found a position at the Polytekniske Læreanstalt in Copenhagen for Arthur von Hippel, who was now his son in law, having married his daughter Dagmar. He decided to provide financial security for his children by dividing his Nobel Prize money between them. The gold medal itself was entrusted to Niels Bohr for safekeeping. When Germany invaded Denmark on 9 April 1940, the Hungarian chemist George de Hevesy dissolved the gold medal, along with that of Max von Laue in aqua regia to prevent the Germans from taking them. He placed the resulting solution on a shelf in his laboratory at the Niels Bohr Institute. After the war, he returned to find the solution undisturbed and precipitated the gold out of the acid. The Nobel Society then recast the Nobel Prize medals.

In 1935, Franck moved to the United States, where he had accepted a professorship at Johns Hopkins University. The laboratory there was poorly equipped compared to the one in Göttingen, but he received $10,000 for equipment from the Rockefeller Foundation. A more intractable problem was that the university had no money to hire skilled staff. Franck was concerned about his family members remaining in Germany, and needed money to help them emigrate. He therefore accepted an offer from the University of Chicago, where his work on photosynthesis had attracted interest, in 1938.

Franck's first paper there, co-authored with Edward Teller, was on photochemical processes in crystals. Hans Gaffron became his collaborator. They were joined by Pringsheim, who escaped from Belgium after the German invasion. Franck arranged a position for Pringsheim at his laboratory. Both his daughters and their families moved to the United States, and he was also able to bring out his elderly mother and aunt. He became a naturalized US citizen on 21 July 1941, so he was not an enemy alien when the United States declared war on Germany on 11 December 1941. His daughters still were, though, so they were restricted from travelling, and could not take care of their mother when she fell ill and died on 10 January 1942, although they were permitted to attend her funeral.

In February 1942, Arthur Compton established its Metallurgical Laboratory at the University of Chicago. As part of the Manhattan Project, its mission was to build nuclear reactors to create plutonium that would be used in atomic bombs. The Metallurgical Laboratory's Chemistry Division was initially headed by Frank Spedding, but he preferred hands on work to administration. Compton then turned to Franck, with some trepidation owing to his German background. Compton later wrote:

How Franck welcomed an invitation to join our project! It was a vote of confidence that far exceeded his hopes, and it gave him a chance to do his part for the cause of freedom. "It's not the German people I'm fighting", he explained. "It's the Nazis. They have a stranglehold over Germany. The German people are helpless until we can break the strength of their Nazi masters." The chemists welcomed Franck as an elder scientific statesman whose guidance they were glad to follow.

In addition to heading the Chemistry Division, Franck was also the chairman of the Metallurgical Laboratory's Committee on Political and Social Problems regarding the atomic bomb, which consisted of himself and Donald J. Hughes, J. J. Nickson, Eugene Rabinowitch, Glenn T. Seaborg, J. C. Stearns and Leó Szilárd. In 1945, Franck warned Henry A. Wallace of their fears that "mankind has learned to unleash atomic power without being ethically and politically prepared to use it wisely." The committee compiled what became known as the Franck Report. Finished on 11 June 1945, it recommended that the atomic bombs not be used on the Japanese cities without warning. In any event, the Interim Committee decided otherwise.

== Later life ==
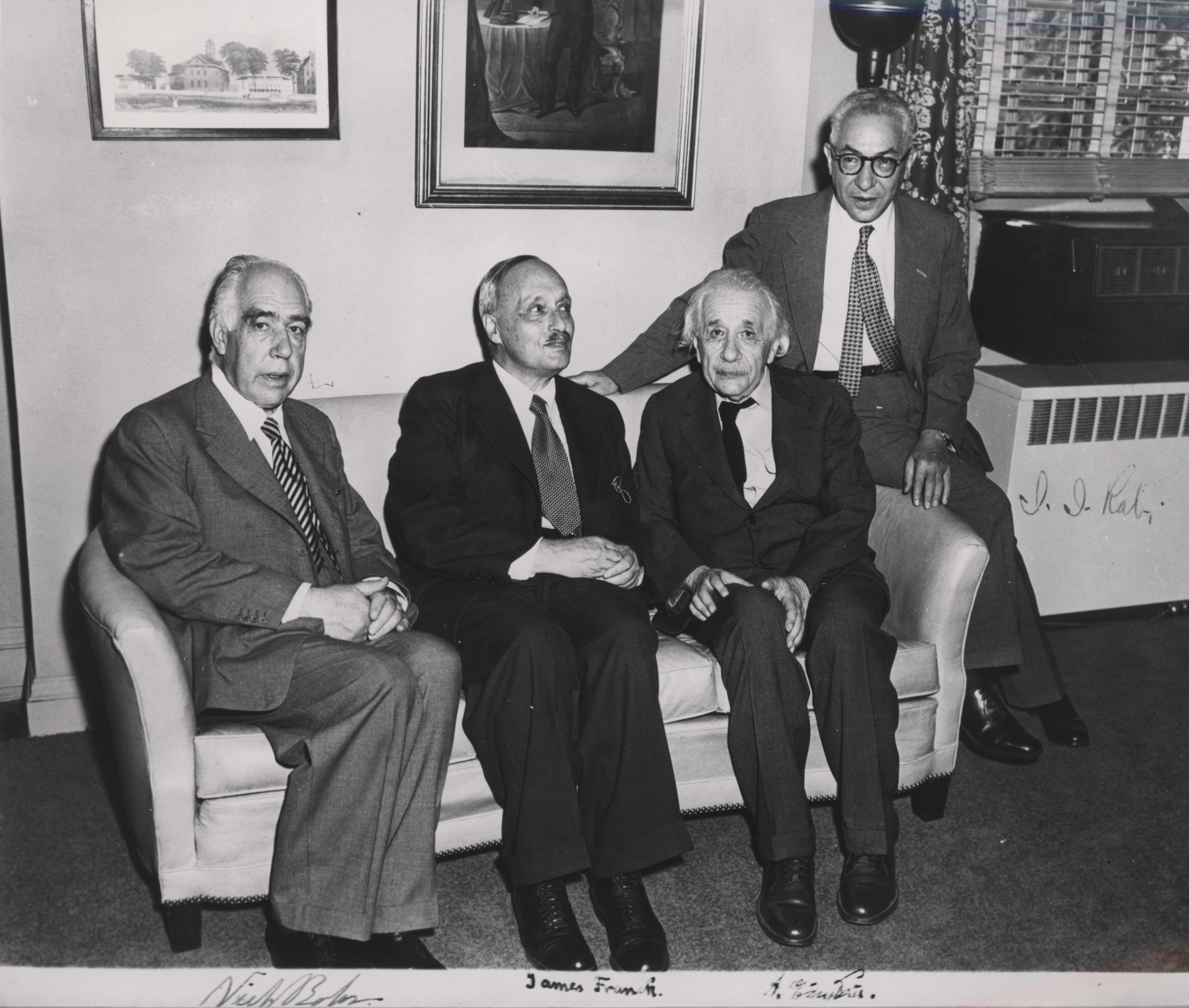
Left to right: Niels Bohr, James Franck, Albert Einstein, and Isidor Rabi in 1954

Franck married Hertha Sponer in a civil ceremony on 29 June 1946, after his first wife, Ingrid, died in 1942. In 1947, he became professor emeritus at the University of Chicago, but continued to work there to tackle the problem of explaining the mechanism of photosynthesis. Meitner saw no break between his early and later work. She recalled that:

Franck enjoyed talking about his problems, not so much to explain them to others as to satisfy his own mind. Once a problem had aroused his interest he was completely captivated, indeed obsessed by it. Common sense and straight logic were his main tools, together with simple apparatus. His research followed an almost straight line, from his early studies of ion mobilities to his last work on photosynthesis; it was always the energy exchange between atoms or molecules that fascinated him.

Franck died suddenly of a heart attack while visiting Göttingen on 21 May 1964 at the age of 81. He is buried in Chicago with his first wife.

== Recognition ==
=== Awards ===
Year	Organization	Award	Citation	Ref.
1925	Royal Swedish Academy of Sciences	Nobel Prize in Physics	"For their [Franck and Gustav Hertz] discovery of the laws governing the impact of an electron upon an atom."	
1951	German Physical Society	Max Planck Medal	—	
1955	American Academy of Arts and Sciences	Rumford Prize	"For his fundamental studies on photosynthesis."	

=== Memberships ===
Year	Organization	Type	Ref.
1929	American Academy of Arts and Sciences	International Honorary Member	
1937	American Philosophical Society	International Member	
1944	National Academy of Sciences	Member	
1964	Royal Society	Foreign Member	

== Commemoration ==
In 1967, the University of Chicago named the James Franck Institute after him. A lunar crater has also been named in his honour. His papers and recast Nobel Prize medal are located in the University of Chicago Library.

== See also ==
- List of Jewish Nobel laureates
