= Peter Theophil Riess =

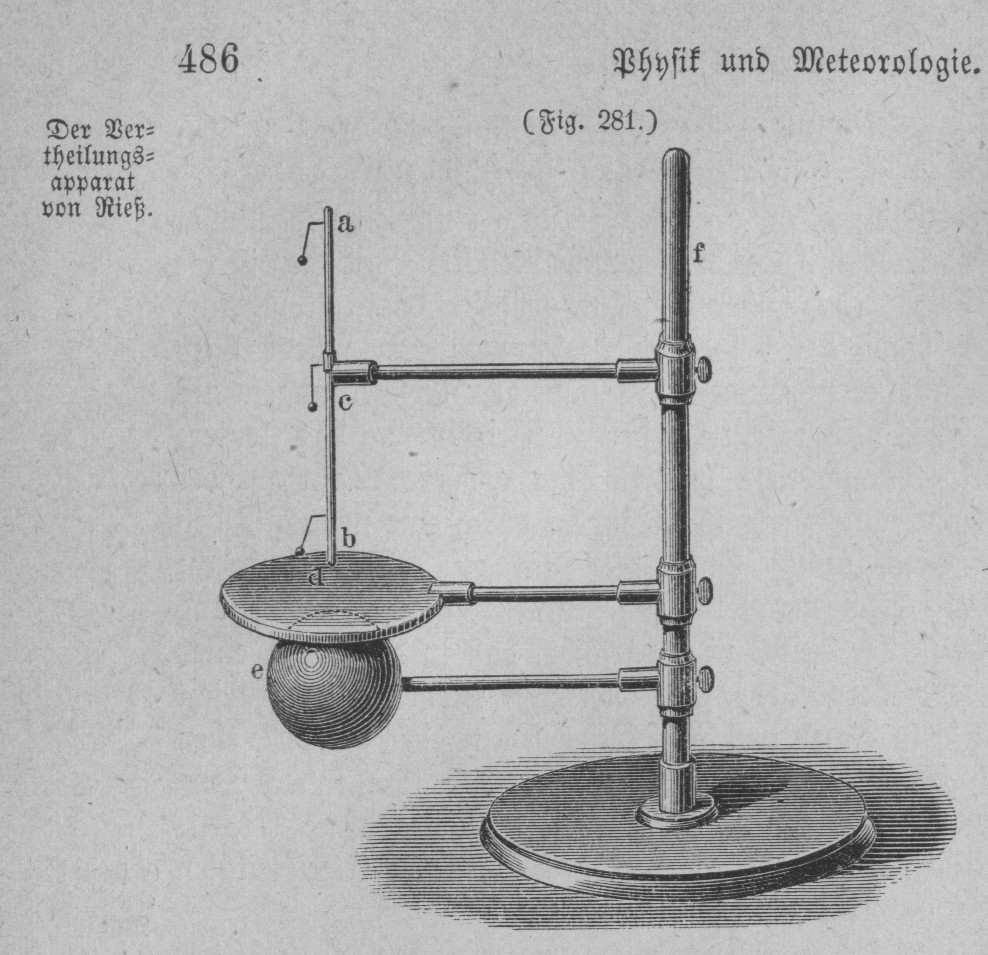
Test apparatus developed by Riess, from the book Die gesammten Naturwissenschaften (1873))

Peter Theophil Riess (27 June 1804 – 22 October 1883) was a German physicist, known mostly for his work in electricity, particularly friction electricity, but also in the field of electromagnetic induction. In the latter work he developed two devices, the spark micrometer (sometimes called the Riess micrometer) and the Riess spiral coils, both of which were used by Heinrich Hertz in his experiments to prove the propagation of electromagnetic waves.

Riess was the son of a wealthy jeweller in Berlin. He received his doctorate in 1831 from the University of Berlin. In the early years after graduation he stayed with his father who was ill and helped run the business. Even after his father died, he never sought an academic teaching position. However he was a fellow (Mitglied) of the Berlin Academy, the first Jewish member of that academy, and under its auspices, and within its journal, Riess published prolifically. He also published several books, as well as many articles in the Annalen der Physik.

Riess was a friend of most of the leading members of the Berlin intelligentsia of the period, and had interests in history, literature, art and music. He died in Berlin at age 79.

== See also ==
- Lichtenberg figure
- Riess spiral
