= Mathilde Carmen Hertz =

German biologist (1891–1975)

- Born: January 14, 1891; Bonn, German Empire
- Died: November 20, 1975 (aged 84); Cambridge, England
- Education: Ludwig-Maximilians-Universität München
- Father: Heinrich Hertz
- Scientific career
- Fields: Biology; Comparative psychology
- Workplaces: Kaiser Wilhelm Institute; University of Cambridge

Mathilde Carmen Hertz (14 January 1891 – 20 November 1975) was a biologist, and was one of the first influential women scientists in the field of biology and a pioneer in the field of comparative psychology. Working in Germany, her career started to unravel in 1933 due to her Jewish ancestry. She was the younger daughter of the famous physicist Heinrich Rudolf Hertz.

== Biography ==
Mathilde Hertz was born on 14 January 1891 in Bonn, Germany. Her father, Heinrich Hertz, died in 1894 when Mathilde Hertz was still very young. Hertz was born into a wealthy and well-educated family. After finishing secondary schooling, she received training in fine arts and worked as a sculptor. One of her first jobs involved reconstructing fossilized teeth at the German Museum.

Ludwig Doederlein noticed her work and encouraged her to enroll at the Ludwig-Maximilians-Universität München for doctoral studies in 1921. In 1925, she completed a doctoral degree based on the analysis of primitive mammalian teeth. Once finished with her dissertation, she focused her attention on a different area. Influenced by renowned animal psychologist Wolfgang Koehler, she moved into the area of animal psychology. She moved to the Kaiser Wilhelm Institute in Berlin, Germany, where she undertook much of her subsequent studies.

With the help of Richard Goldschmidt, she started running her own laboratory in Berlin. Here, in 1929, she completed a post-doctoral degree studying the optical fields of honeybees. Wolfgang Koehler was one of her post-doctoral committee members. Hertz continued laboratory work and lecturing after her post-doc until her career began to unravel in 1933. Under the newly elected Nazi regime, she was forced to give up teaching due to her Jewish ancestry. Both Max Planck and Wolfgang Koehler spoke out for her, and so she was allowed to continue laboratory work for a few years. After turning down an offer from Columbia University to come to the United States, she immigrated to the United Kingdom and continued her research at the University of Cambridge in 1935. In England, however, she was more known for her famous father and not so much for her own work. After only two years at the University of Cambridge, she stopped publishing and disappeared from the public spotlight. Unwilling to accept charity based on her family ties, she died in poverty in 1975.

== Work ==
Mathilde Hertz concentrated on primitive mammalian teeth for her doctoral thesis. Once she received her doctoral degree, however, Hertz moved away from studying teeth and focused on animal psychology. She initially concentrated on the behavior of ravens. She was specifically interested in the visual perception of these birds. Her findings are valued for many reasons. Among others, she published important findings explaining problem-solving in animals. In the years following, she focused primarily on the visual perception of honeybees Other animals she studied include blue jays, hermit crabs, and flies.

== Family legacy ==
Mathilde Hertz, who herself never had children, came from a well-known family of scientists. Her father Heinrich Rudolf Hertz is famous for proving the existence of electromagnetic radio waves. Her cousin, Gustav Ludwig Hertz, studied under Max Planck among others and was awarded the Nobel Prize for his work in the field of nuclear physics in 1925. Gustav Ludwig Hertz's son Carl Hellmuth Hertz, in turn, developed medical ultrasonography at Lund University in Sweden.
