= Franck Report =

1945 report on US use of nuclear bomb

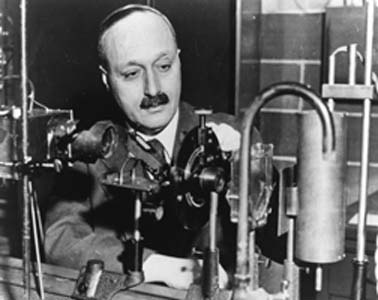
James Franck.

The Franck Report of June 1945 was a document signed by several prominent nuclear physicists recommending that the United States not use the atomic bomb as a weapon to prompt the surrender of Japan in World War II.

The report was named for James Franck, the head of the committee that produced it. The committee was appointed by Arthur Compton and met in secret, in all-night sessions in a highly secure environment. Largely written by Eugene Rabinowitch, the report spoke about the impossibility to keep the United States atomic discoveries secret indefinitely. It predicted a nuclear arms race, forcing the United States to develop nuclear armaments at such a pace that no other nation would think of attacking first from fear of overwhelming retaliation. This prediction turned out to be accurate, as the nuclear arms race and the concept of mutual assured destruction became a major factor in the Cold War. The report recommended that the nuclear bomb not be used, and proposed that either a demonstration of the "new weapon" be made before the eyes of representatives of all of the United Nations, on a barren island or desert, or to try to keep the existence of the nuclear bomb secret for as long as possible.

In the first case, the international community would be warned of the dangers and encouraged to develop an effective international control on such weapons. In the latter case, the United States would gain several years time to further develop their nuclear armament before other countries would start their own production. The Franck Report was signed by James Franck (Chairman), Donald J. Hughes, J. J. Nickson, Eugene Rabinowitch, Glenn T. Seaborg, J. C. Stearns, and Leó Szilárd.

By an accident of history, we were among a very few who were aware of a new, world-threatening peril, and we felt obligated to express our views.

— Glenn T. Seaborg

Franck took the report to Washington June 12, where the Interim Committee, appointed by President Truman to advise him on use of the atomic bomb, met on June 21 to reexamine its earlier conclusions. However, this committee reaffirmed that there was no alternative to the use of the bomb and on August 6 and 9, the Americans dropped atomic bombs on Hiroshima and Nagasaki.

The Report was declassified and released to the public in early 1946, but Manhattan Project officials required the censorship of some passages.

== See also ==
- Szilárd petition - unsuccessful petition against use of the atomic bomb, signed by 70 Manhattan Project scientists in July, 1945.
- Ralph Austin Bard - containing description of memorandum by Under Secretary of the Navy Ralph A. Bard urging warning to Japan before using the atomic bomb.
