= Donald J. Hughes =

American nuclear physicist

- Born: April 2, 1915
- Died: April 12, 1960 (aged 45)
- Scientific career
- Fields: nuclear physics
- Workplaces: Naval Ordnance Laboratory; Brookhaven National Laboratory

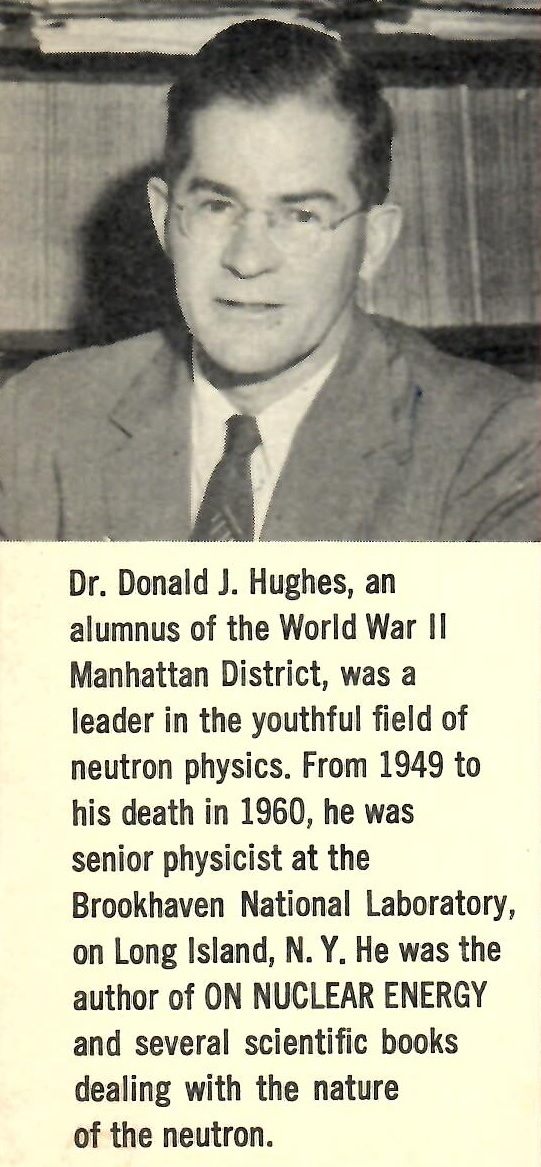
From the back of book The Neutron Story by Donald J. Hugues

Donald James Hughes (April 2, 1915 – April 12, 1960) was an American nuclear physicist, chiefly notable as one of the signers off the Franck Report in June, 1945, recommending that the United States not use the atomic bomb as a weapon to prompt the surrender of Japan in World War II.

Before the war Hughes worked at the Naval Ordnance Laboratory. By June 1945, the U.S. was deciding whether to use an atomic bomb against Japan, and a very few nuclear scientists knew about the weapon's potential. Some, including Hughes, were wary, and wanted to urge the President of the United States to choose a different option. Arthur Compton appointed a committee to meet in secret, in all-night sessions in a highly secure environment. This committee included Hughes, and was chaired by James Franck. The final report, largely written by committee-member Eugene Rabinowitch, recommended that the nuclear bomb not be used, and proposed that either a demonstration of the "new weapon" be made before the eyes of representatives of all of the United Nations, on a barren island or desert, or to try to keep the existence of the nuclear bomb secret for as long as possible. The advice of the "Franck Report" was not followed, however, and the U.S. dropped nuclear weapons on Hiroshima and Nagasaki.

After the war Hughes went to Brookhaven National Laboratory and formed a group of physicists working on contemporary problems in nuclear science. His work centered on the neutron. Many of his publications were translated into Russian; more copies of his work were printed in the USSR than in the US. He also spent one year at Oxford teaching.

He wrote a popular science book, The Neutron Story, published 1959. He died suddenly of a heart attack in 1960.

Other works:

- Pile Neutron Research (1953)
- Neutron Optics (1954)
- Neutron Cross Sections (1957)
- On nuclear energy: its potential for peacetime uses (1957)
- Neutron Cross Sections (A compilation which the Government Printing Office published for the second Geneva conference.)
