= Spark micrometer =

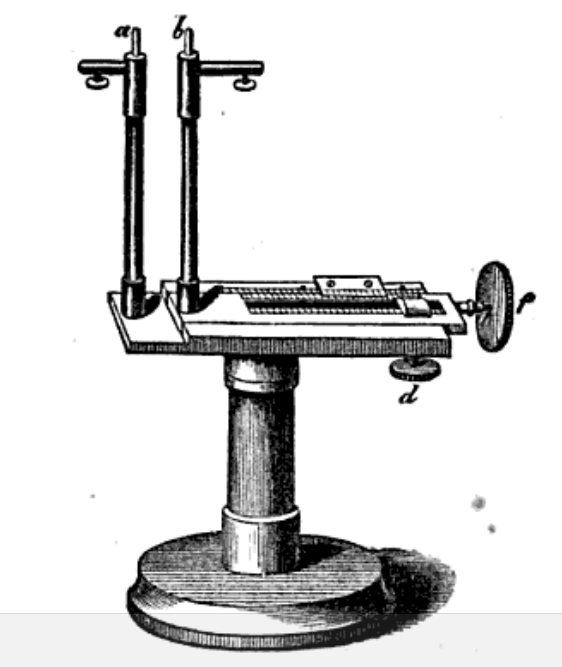
Riess' instrument for measuring potential

The spark micrometer, also known as a Riess micrometer was a device used by 19th century physicists to measure potential in an electric circuit. It was developed principally by German physicist Peter Riess. It consisted of two electrodes very close together, one of which was attached to a micrometer screw with a calibrated dial, so by turning a knob the width of the gap could be adjusted very precisely. From Paschen's law, the distance between two electrodes when a spark just jumped across a gap was proportional to the potential difference (voltage) between the electrodes, so a spark micrometer could serve as a crude voltage measuring instrument, by widening the gap until the voltage was just able to jump across.

In 1887 Heinrich Hertz found that a spark in a nearby apparatus could induce a spark in a spark gap between the ends of a loop of wire not attached to any source of electricity, discovering radio waves. Hertz used spark micrometers attached to small loop and dipole antennas as receivers in historic experiments to investigate the properties of radio waves. Since the voltage induced in the receiving antenna was proportional to the signal strength of the radio wave, by measuring the length of spark it produced Hertz could measure the field strength of the wave. He showed that radio waves, like light, exhibit refraction, diffraction, interference and standing waves, proving that both radio waves and light are electromagnetic waves. This validated Maxwell's 1873 theory of electromagnetism and his prediction that light consisted of electromagnetic waves.
