= Franck–Hertz experiment =

1914 confirmation of the atom's quantum nature

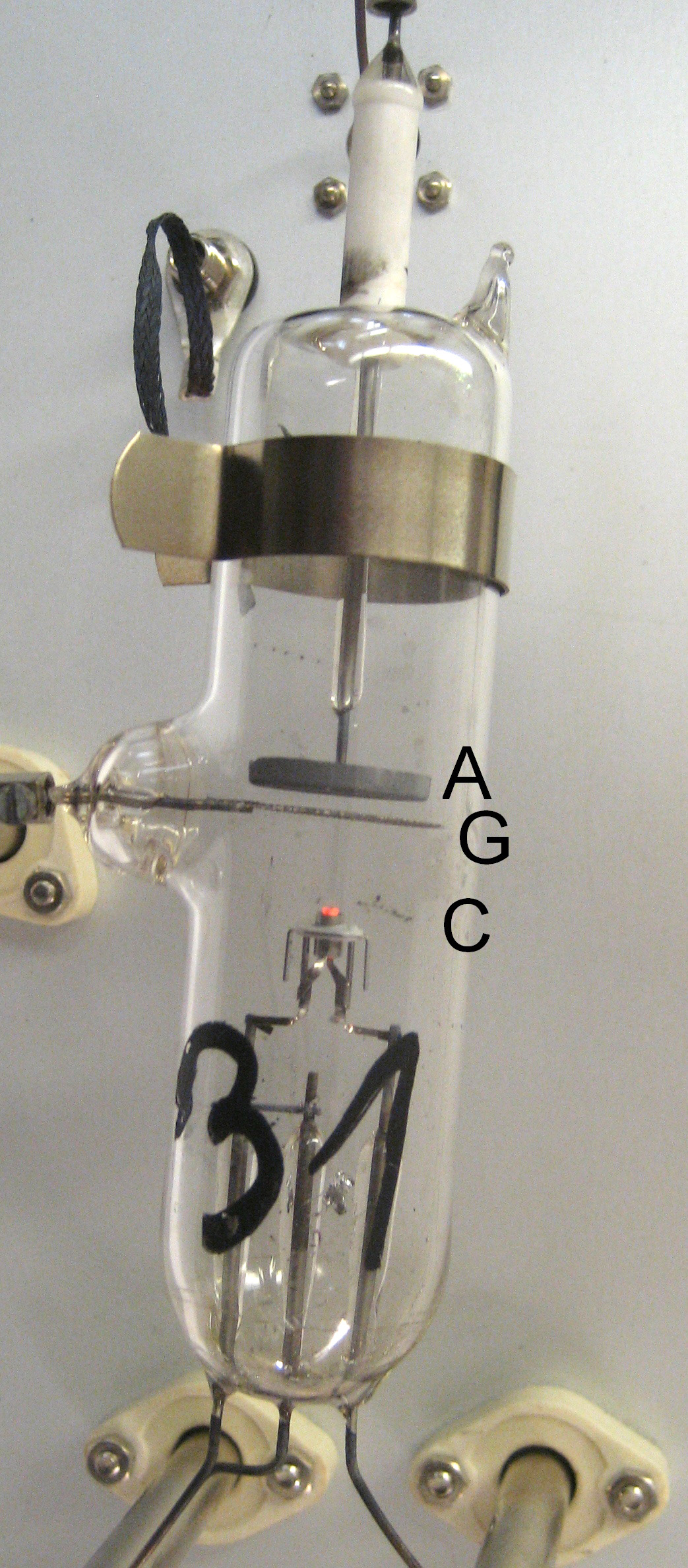
Photograph of a vacuum tube used for the Franck–Hertz experiment in instructional laboratories. There is a droplet of mercury inside the tube, which is not visible in the photograph. C – cathode assembly; the cathode is hot, and glows orange. It emits electrons which pass through the metal mesh grid (G) and are collected as an electric current by the anode (A).

The Franck–Hertz experiment was the first electrical measurement to clearly show the quantum nature of atoms. It was presented on 24 April 1914, to the German Physical Society in a paper by James Franck and Gustav Hertz. Franck and Hertz had designed a vacuum tube for studying energetic electrons that flew through a thin vapour of mercury atoms. They discovered that when an electron collided with a mercury atom, it could lose only a specific quantity (4.9 electron volts) of its kinetic energy before flying away. This energy loss corresponds to decelerating the electron from a speed of about 1.3 million metres per second to zero. A faster electron does not decelerate completely after a collision, but loses precisely the same amount of its kinetic energy. Slower electrons merely bounce off mercury atoms without losing any significant speed or kinetic energy.

These experimental results proved to be consistent with the Bohr model for atoms that had been proposed the previous year by Niels Bohr. The Bohr model was a precursor of quantum mechanics and of the electron shell model of atoms. Its key feature was that an electron inside an atom occupies one of the atom's "quantum energy levels". Before the collision, an electron inside the mercury atom occupies its lowest available energy level. After the collision, the electron inside occupies a higher energy level with 4.9 electronvolts (eV) more energy. This means that the electron is more loosely bound to the mercury atom. There were no intermediate levels or possibilities in Bohr's quantum model. This feature was "revolutionary" because it was inconsistent with the expectation that an electron could be bound to an atom's nucleus by any amount of energy.

In a second paper presented in May 1914, Franck and Hertz reported on the light emission by the mercury atoms that had absorbed energy from collisions. They showed that the wavelength of this ultraviolet light corresponded exactly to the 4.9 eV of energy that the flying electron had lost. The relationship of energy and wavelength had also been predicted by Bohr because he had followed the structure laid out by Hendrik Lorentz at the 1911 Solvay Congress. At Solvay, Hendrik Lorentz suggested after Einstein's talk on quantum structure that the energy of a rotator be set equal to nhv. Therefore, Bohr had followed the instructions given in 1911 and copied the formula proposed by Lorentz and others into his 1913 atomic model. Lorentz had been correct. The quantisation of the atoms matched his formula incorporated into the Bohr model. After a presentation of these results by Franck a few years later, Albert Einstein is said to have remarked, "It's so lovely it makes you cry."

On 10 December 1926, Franck and Hertz were awarded the 1925 Nobel Prize in Physics "for their discovery of the laws governing the impact of an electron upon an atom".

== Experiment ==
Anode current (arbitrary units) versus grid voltage (relative to the cathode). This graph is based on the original 1914 paper by Franck and Hertz.

Franck and Hertz's original experiment used a heated vacuum tube containing a drop of mercury; they reported a tube temperature of 115 °C, at which the vapour pressure of mercury is about 100 pascals (about a thousandth of the atmospheric pressure). A contemporary Franck–Hertz tube is shown in the photograph. It is fitted with three electrodes: an electron-emitting, hot cathode; a metal mesh grid; and an anode. The grid's voltage is positive relative to the cathode, so that electrons emitted from the hot cathode are drawn to it. The electric current measured in the experiment is due to electrons that pass through the grid and reach the anode. The anode's electric potential is slightly negative relative to the grid, so that electrons that reach the anode have at least a corresponding amount of kinetic energy after passing the grid.

Wavelengths of light emitted by a mercury vapour discharge and by a Franck–Hertz tube in operation at 10 V. The Franck–Hertz tube primarily emits light with a wavelength near 254 nanometres; the discharge emits light at many wavelengths. Based on the original 1914 figure.

The graphs published by Franck and Hertz (see figure) show the dependence of the electric current flowing out of the anode upon the electric potential between the grid and the cathode.

- At low potential differences—up to 4.9 volts—the current through the tube increased steadily with increasing potential difference. This behaviour is typical of true vacuum tubes that do not contain mercury vapour; larger voltages lead to larger "space-charge limited current".
- At 4.9 volts the current drops sharply, almost back to zero.
- The current then increases steadily once again as the voltage is increased further, until 9.8 volts is reached (exactly 4.9+4.9 volts).
- At 9.8 volts a similar sharp drop is observed.
- While it is not evident in the original measurements of the figure, this series of dips in current at approximately 4.9 volt increments continues to potentials of at least 70 volts.

Franck and Hertz noted in their first paper that the 4.9 eV characteristic energy of their experiment corresponded well to one of the wavelengths of light emitted by mercury atoms in gas discharges. They were using a quantum relationship between the energy of excitation and the corresponding wavelength of light, which they broadly attributed to Johannes Stark and to Arnold Sommerfeld; it predicts that 4.9 eV corresponds to light with a 254 nm wavelength. The same relationship was also incorporated in Einstein's 1905 photon theory of the photoelectric effect. In a second paper, Franck and Hertz reported the optical emission from their tubes, which emitted light with a single prominent wavelength 254 nm. The figure at the right shows the spectrum of a Franck–Hertz tube; nearly all of the light emitted has a single wavelength. For reference, the figure also shows the spectrum for a mercury gas discharge light, which emits light at several wavelengths besides 254 nm. The figure is based on the original spectra published by Franck and Hertz in 1914. The fact that the Franck–Hertz tube emitted just the single wavelength, corresponding nearly exactly to the voltage period they had measured, was very important.

== Modelling of electron collisions with atoms ==
Elastic and inelastic collisions of electrons with mercury atoms. Electrons travelling slowly change direction after elastic collisions, but do not change their speed. Faster electrons lose most of their speed in inelastic collisions. The lost kinetic energy is deposited into the mercury atom. The atom subsequently emits light, and returns to its original state.

Franck and Hertz explained their experiment in terms of elastic and inelastic collisions between the electrons and the mercury atoms. Slowly moving electrons collide elastically with the mercury atoms. This means that the direction in which the electron is moving is altered by the collision, but its speed is unchanged. An elastic collision is illustrated in the figure, where the length of the arrow indicates the electron's speed. The mercury atom is unaffected by the collision, mostly because it is about 400,000 times more massive than an electron.

When the speed of the electron exceeds about 1.3 million metres per second, collisions with a mercury atom become inelastic. This speed corresponds to a kinetic energy of 4.9 eV, which is deposited into the mercury atom. As shown in the figure, the electron's speed is reduced, and the mercury atom becomes "excited". A short time later, the 4.9 eV of energy that was deposited into the mercury atom is released as ultraviolet light that has a wavelength of 254 nm. Following light emission, the mercury atom returns to its original, unexcited state.

If electrons emitted from the cathode flew freely until they arrived at the grid, they would acquire a kinetic energy proportional to the voltage applied to the grid. 1 eV of kinetic energy corresponds to a potential difference of 1 volt between the grid and the cathode. Elastic collisions with the mercury atoms increase the time it takes for an electron to arrive at the grid, but the average kinetic energy of electrons arriving there is not much affected.

When the grid voltage reaches 4.9 V, electron collisions near the grid become inelastic, and the electrons are greatly slowed. The kinetic energy of a typical electron arriving at the grid is reduced so much that it cannot travel further to reach the anode, whose voltage is set to slightly repel electrons. The current of electrons reaching the anode falls, as seen in the graph. Further increases in the grid voltage restore enough energy to the electrons that suffered inelastic collisions that they can again reach the anode. The current rises again as the grid potential rises beyond 4.9 V. At 9.8 V, the situation changes again. Electrons that have travelled roughly halfway from the cathode to the grid have already acquired enough energy to suffer a first inelastic collision. As they continue slowly towards the grid from the midway point, their kinetic energy builds up again, but as they reach the grid they can suffer a second inelastic collision. Once again, the current to the anode drops. At intervals of 4.9 volts this process will repeat; each time the electrons will undergo one additional inelastic collision.

== Early quantum theory ==
Franck and Hertz were unaware of it when they published their experiments in 1914, but in 1913 Niels Bohr had published a model for atoms that was very successful in accounting for the optical properties of atomic hydrogen. These were usually observed in gas discharges, which emitted light at a series of wavelengths. Ordinary light sources like incandescent light bulbs emit light at all wavelengths. Bohr had calculated the wavelengths emitted by hydrogen very accurately.

The fundamental assumption of the Bohr model concerns the possible binding energies of an electron to the nucleus of an atom. The atom can be ionised if a collision with another particle supplies at least this binding energy. This frees the electron from the atom, and leaves a positively charged ion behind. There is an analogy with satellites orbiting the Earth. Every satellite has its own orbit, and practically any orbital distance, and any satellite binding energy, is possible. Since an electron is attracted to the positive charge of the atomic nucleus by a similar force, so-called "classical" calculations suggest that any binding energy should also be possible for electrons. However, Bohr assumed that only a specific series of binding energies occur, which correspond to the "quantum energy levels" for the electron. An electron is normally found in the lowest energy level, with the largest binding energy. Additional levels lie higher, with smaller binding energies. Intermediate binding energies lying between these levels are not permitted. This was a revolutionary assumption.

Franck and Hertz had proposed that the 4.9 V characteristic of their experiments was due to ionisation of mercury atoms by collisions with the flying electrons emitted at the cathode. In 1915 Bohr published a paper noting that the measurements of Franck and Hertz were more consistent with the assumption of quantum levels in his own model for atoms. In the Bohr model, the collision excited an internal electron within the atom from its lowest level to the first quantum level above it. The Bohr model also predicted that light would be emitted as the internal electron returned from its excited quantum level to the lowest one; its wavelength corresponded to the energy difference of the atom's internal levels, which has been called the Bohr relation. Franck and Hertz's observation of emission from their tube at 254 nm was also consistent with Bohr's perspective. Writing following the end of World War I in 1918, Franck and Hertz had largely adopted the Bohr perspective for interpreting their experiment, which has become one of the experimental pillars of quantum mechanics. As Abraham Pais described it, "Now the beauty of Franck and Hertz's work lies not only in the measurement of the energy loss E_{2}-E_{1} of the impinging electron, but they also observed that, when the energy of that electron exceeds 4.9 eV, mercury begins to emit ultraviolet light of a definite frequency ν as defined in the above formula. Thereby they gave (unwittingly at first) the first direct experimental proof of the Bohr relation!" Franck himself emphasised the importance of the ultraviolet emission experiment in an epilogue to the 1960 Physical Science Study Committee (PSSC) film about the Franck–Hertz experiment.

The Bohr model of the atom assumed that an electron could be bound to an atomic nucleus only with one of a series of specific energies corresponding to quantum energy levels. Earlier, classical models for the binding of particles allowed any binding energy.

== Experiment with neon ==
In instructional laboratories, the Franck–Hertz experiment is often done using neon gas, which shows the onset of inelastic collisions with a visible orange glow in the vacuum tube, and which is non-toxic, should the tube be broken. With mercury tubes, the model for elastic and inelastic collisions predicts that there should be narrow bands between the anode and the grid where the mercury emits light, but the light is ultraviolet and invisible. With neon, the Franck–Hertz voltage interval is 18.7 volts, and an orange glow appears near the grid when 18.7 volts is applied. This glow will move closer to the cathode with increasing accelerating potential, and indicates the locations where electrons have acquired the 18.7 eV required to excite a neon atom. At 37.4 volts two distinct glows will be visible: one midway between the cathode and grid, and one right at the accelerating grid. Higher potentials, spaced at 18.7 volt intervals, will result in additional glowing regions in the tube.

An additional advantage of neon for instructional laboratories is that the tube can be used at room temperature. However, the wavelength of the visible emission is much longer than predicted by the Bohr relation and the 18.7 V interval. A partial explanation for the orange light involves two atomic levels lying 16.6 eV and 18.7 eV above the lowest level. Electrons excited to the 18.7 eV level fall to the 16.6 eV level, with orange light emission.

Franck-Hertz experiment with neon resulting in glowing regions appearing

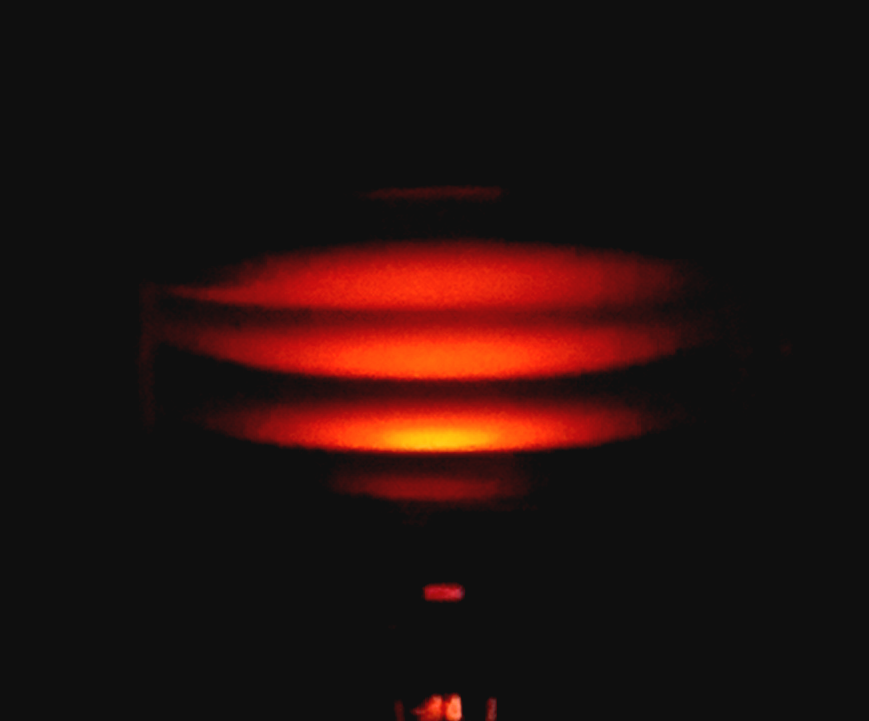
Franck-Hertz experiment with neon gas: three glowing regions

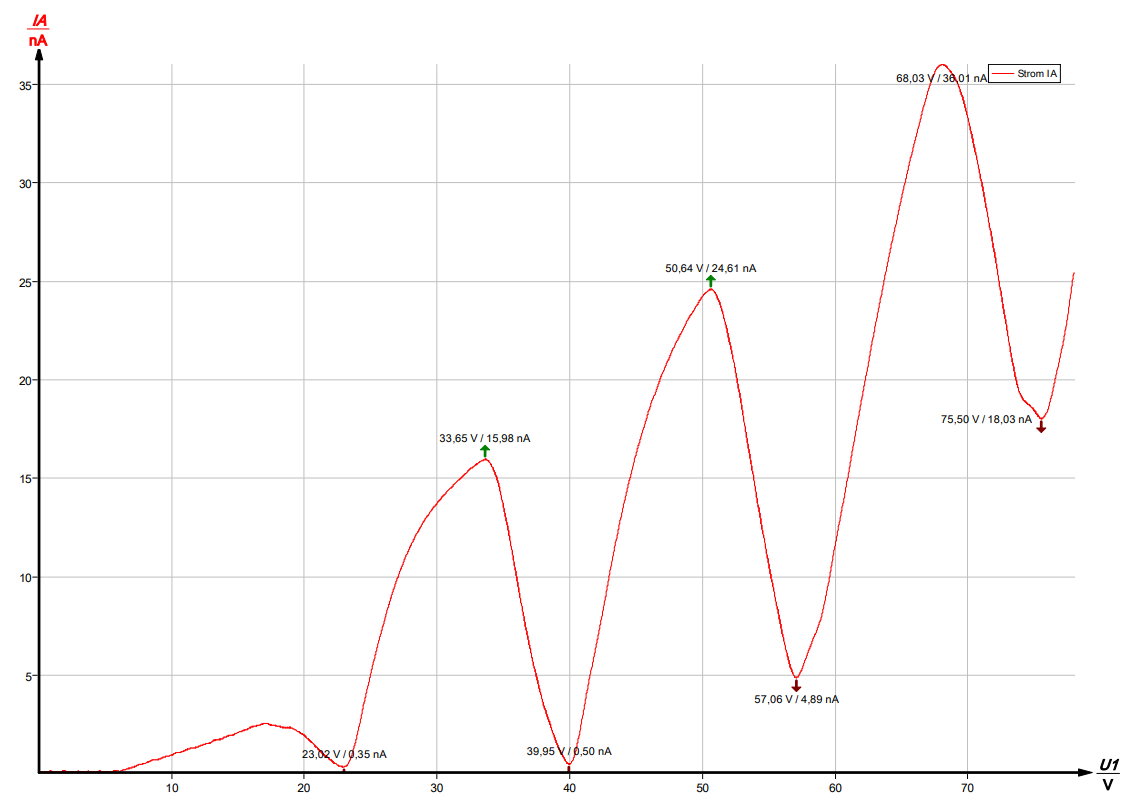
Franck-Hertz experiment with neon: Anode current versus grid voltage (relative to the cathode).
