= Riess spiral =

Pair of spiral conductors with metal balls at their ends

Riess spirals, or Knochenhauer spirals, are a pair of spirally wound conductors with metal balls at their ends. Placing one above the other forms an induction coil. Heinrich Hertz used them in his discovery of radio waves. They are named for German physicists Peter Theophil Riess and K. W. Knochenhaue.
