= Eugene Rabinowitch =

Russian-American biophysicist (1898–1973)

- Rabinowitch in his University of Illinois office, in the basement of the Natural History Building, Matthews Avenue, Urbana, Illinois, 1950s
- Born: Evgenii Isaakovich Rabinovich; April 27, 1901; St. Petersburg, Russia
- Died: May 15, 1973 (aged 72); Washington, D.C., U.S.
- Education: University of Berlin; University College London
- Occupation: Biophysicist
- Known for: Co-founder of the Bulletin of the Atomic Scientists
- Awards: Kalinga Prize (1965)

Eugene Rabinowitch (Russian: Евгений Исаакович Рабинович; April 27, 1901 – May 15, 1973) was a Russian-American biophysicist who is known for his work in photosynthesis and nuclear energy. He was a co-author of the Franck Report and a co-founder in 1945 of the Bulletin of the Atomic Scientists, a global security and public policy magazine, which he edited until his death.

== Early life ==
Rabinowitch was born Evgenii Isaakovich Rabinovich in Saint Petersburg on 27 April [O.S. 14 April] 1901; his parents, Zinaida Moiseevna and Isaak Moiseevich Rabinovich, were a lawyer and a pianist. During WWI Rabinowitch studied chemistry in Saint Petersburg. Initially a supporter of the Russian Revolution, he and his family fled to Kiev and then Warsaw with the onset of the Red Terror in late 1918. Ultimately fleeing to Germany, Rabinowitch was able to take a course Einstein taught on relativity, and attend academic events that included Max Planck and Max von Laue. In 1925 he got a PhD in chemistry at the University of Berlin. He later worked with James Franck at Göttingen, where he co-discovered the cage effect, sometimes called the Franck-Rabinowitch effect. After the Nazis came to power in Germany in 1933, Rabinowitch's stipend in Gottingen was cancelled; he was invited to work for a year with Niels Bohr in Denmark, in Bohr's Institute of Physics, before finding a job in London.

In 1932 Rabinowitch married Russian actress Anya Rabinowitch, and in 1934 the couple had twins, Victor and Alexander Rabinowitch.

== Botany ==
Rabinowitch was studying the photochemical properties of chlorophyll at University College London from 1934 to 1938. In the summer he went to Marine Biological Laboratory and began to compile a bibliography on photosynthesis. This work grew into a book published April 1945 that he wrote largely during the summers at Woods Hole.

In 1938 Rabinowitch moved to the United States and joined the Solar Energy Research Project at the Massachusetts Institute of Technology. When he arrived in New York City, he was assisted by Selig Hecht,

a man whose spontaneous sympathy, friendship and assistance were so generously given to me when I first came to America and felt lost in the human sea of New York.

The American Association for Advancement of Science sponsored symposia that Rabinowitch attended: 1939 in Columbus and 1941 at Gibson Island supporting research on the book. Rabinowitch credits Selig Hecht with help in the early stages, and Hans Gaffron for reading the manuscript.

After World War II, Rabinowitch taught and researched botany as a professor at the University of Illinois Urbana-Champaign, continuing his photosynthesis work and publishing the three-volume Photosynthesis and Related Processes. The book is called the "Bible of Photosynthesis", and Rabinowitch a "Prophet of Photosynthesis".

In 1965 he and his student Govindjee contributed an article to Scientific American on the role of chlorophyll in photosynthesis.

On the occasion of the bicentennial of the discovery of photosynthesis, Rabinowitch penned a summary of the stages of this development. A key step was Joseph Priestley's experiment with a sprig of mint to restore oxygen to a vessel depleted of this element by a burning candle. Jan Ingenhousz noted the factors of sunlight and green leaves, Jean Senebier noted the necessity of "fixed air" (carbon dioxide), Nicolas Théodore de Saussure noted the role of water, and Julius Robert Mayer noted the transmutation of light to potential chemical energy.

A bibliography of Rabinowitch's publications was compiled by Govindjee at the department of botany, University of Illinois. The papers of Rabinowitch are held in the special collections at the University of Chicago Library.

== Nuclear energy ==
During World War II Rabinowitch worked for the Manhattan Project, and joined the Metallurgical Laboratory (or "Met Lab") at the University of Chicago. As a member of the Committee on Political and Social Problems, chaired by James Franck, Rabinowitch and Leó Szilárd wrote the so-called Franck Report, that "recommended that nuclear energy be brought under civilian rather than military control and argued that the United States should demonstrate the atomic bomb to world leaders in an uninhabited desert or barren island before using it in combat." His main task for the Manhattan Project was to prepare a handbook on uranium chemistry, based on new data obtained in the experiments.

Rabinowitch and fellow physicist Hyman Goldsmith founded the Bulletin of the Atomic Scientists in 1945; Rabinowitch was its editor until his death in 1973, and wrote more than 100 articles for the magazine, most of them editorials. In the twenty-fifth anniversary issue of the Bulletin, Rabinowitch wrote that the magazine's purpose "was to awaken the public to full understanding of the horrendous reality of nuclear weapons and of their far-reaching implications for the future of mankind; to warn of the inevitability of other nations acquiring nuclear weapons within a few years, and of the futility of relying on America's possession of the 'secret' of the bomb."

According to the historian of the Pugwash Conferences,

Eugene Rabinowitch was one of the first to call and work for setting up of international discussions; it is largely due to his enthusiasm and devotion that many of the events recorded here have materialized. One example of his untiring efforts was the convening of an informal talk in September 1951 in Chicago, during a conference on nuclear physics attended by scientists from many countries.

In 1959 he re-issued Explaining the Atom that Selig Hecht had written in 1947 when nuclear energy was a novel concept.

== Selected publications ==
- (1945) Photosynthesis and Related Processes, vol I. Interscience Publishers, New York
- (1951) Photosynthesis and Related Processes, vol II, part 1. Interscience Publishers, New York
- (1956) Photosynthesis and Related Processes, vol II, part 2. Interscience Publishers, New York
