= Hilde Levi =

German-Danish physicist

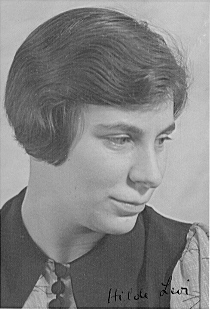
- Hilde Levi
- Born: 9 May 1909; Frankfurt, Germany
- Died: 26 June 2003 (aged 94); Copenhagen, Denmark
- Citizenship: Germany / Denmark
- Education: Friedrich Wilhelm University of Berlin
- Known for: Radiocarbon dating, Autoradiography
- Scientific career
- Fields: Physics
- Workplaces: Kaiser Wilhelm Institute (1932–1934); Niels Bohr Institute (1934–1943); Wenner-Gren Institute for Experimental Biology (1943–1945); Zoo Physiological Laboratory (1945–1979); Niels Bohr Archive (1979–2003)
- Doctoral advisor: Peter Pringsheim; Fritz Haber

Hilde Levi (9 May 1909 – 26 July 2003) was a German-Danish physicist. She was a pioneer of the use of radioactive isotopes in biology and medicine, notably the techniques of radiocarbon dating and autoradiography. In later life she became a scientific historian, and published a biography of George de Hevesy.

Born into a non-religious Jewish family in Frankfurt, Germany, Levi entered the Ludwig-Maximilians-Universität München in 1929. She carried out her doctoral studies at the Kaiser Wilhelm Institute for Physical Chemistry and Electrochemistry at Berlin-Dahlem, writing her thesis on the spectra of alkali metal halides under the supervision of Peter Pringsheim and Fritz Haber. By the time she completed it in 1934, the Nazi Party had been elected to office in Germany, and Jews were no longer allowed to be hired for academic positions. She went to Denmark where she found a position at the Niels Bohr Institute of Theoretical Physics at the University of Copenhagen. Working with James Franck and George de Hevesy, she published a number of papers on the use of radioactive substances in biology.

When the Nazis began rounding up Danish Jews in September 1943, Levi fled to Sweden, where she worked for the biologist John Runnström at the Wenner-Gren Institute for Experimental Biology in Stockholm. After the war ended, she returned to Denmark to work at the Zoophysiological Laboratory in Copenhagen. She spent the 1947–48 academic year in the United States learning about the recently discovered techniques of radiocarbon dating and autoradiography, which she introduced to Europe. She retired from the Zoophysiological Laboratory in 1979, but became involved with the Niels Bohr Archive, where she collected papers of de Hevesy, eventually publishing his biography.

== Early life ==
Hilde Levi was born in Frankfurt, Germany, on 9 May 1909, the daughter of Adolf Levi, the sales director of a metal company, and his wife Clara (née Reis), the daughter of a printer. Hilde had an older brother called Edwin. She was a gifted musician who learned to play the piano at a young age. During the summers, she would listen to performances at her cousins' summer house in Bavaria by musicians including Elisabeth Schumann and Richard Strauss.

Although Jewish, Levi's family did not practise their religion, and were not part of the Jewish community, but when she was enrolled at the Victoria School (now the Bettina School) in Frankfurt, her religion was listed as Jewish. Religious instruction was compulsory, so she had to attend classes with a local rabbi. She soon rebelled against this, and told her parents that she did not wish to attend the classes. She came to reject formal religion.

While at high school, Levi decided that she would become a scientist. Her final year was devoted to a physics project on spectra and photography, which became her Oberreal Abiturium. She was the only girl in her class to major in physics that year. After her graduation in April 1928, her father sent her to England for six months to learn English. She entered the Ludwig-Maximilians-Universität München in 1929, where she listened to lectures by Arnold Sommerfeld. For her doctorate, she was accepted into the Kaiser Wilhelm Institute for Physical Chemistry and Electrochemistry at Berlin-Dahlem, where she wrote her thesis on the spectra of alkali metal halides, under the supervision of Peter Pringsheim and Fritz Haber.

== Nazi period ==
By the time Levi received her doctorate in 1934, the Nazi Party had been elected to office in Germany. Her supervisors had gone into exile, and Jews were no longer allowed to be hired for academic positions. The Danish branch of the International Federation of University Women helped Levi find a position at the Niels Bohr Institute of Theoretical Physics at the University of Copenhagen in Denmark. Niels Bohr asked James Franck, another refugee from Germany, if he knew Levi, and would be willing to have Levi as his assistant. Franck replied that he did not know her personally, but he knew her thesis, and rated it highly.

She became engaged to the physicist Hans Bethe in 1934. The two had known each other since 1925. However, his mother, although herself Jewish, was opposed to her son marrying a Jewish girl, and he broke off the engagement a few days before the wedding was to take place. Bethe's action shocked Franck and Bohr. Although an eminent physicist, Bethe would not be invited to visit the Niels Bohr Institute until after the Second World War. Levi never married, but became friends with many of the Jewish physicists who did visit the institute, including Otto Frisch, George Placzek, Rudolf Peierls, Leon Rosenfeld, Edward Teller and Victor Weisskopf.

Levi worked as Franck's assistant, publishing two papers with him on the fluorescence of chlorophyll, until he left Denmark for the United States in 1935. She then became assistant to the Hungarian physical chemist George de Hevesy. The recent discovery of induced radioactivity and the consequent creation of short-lived radioactive isotopes opened up a number of new uses for radioactive substances in biology which she explored with de Hevesy, publishing a number of papers with him. The Friedrich Wilhelm University of Berlin cancelled Levi's doctorate in 1938. In April 1940, the Germans occupied Denmark. When the Nazis began rounding up Danish Jews in September 1943, Levi was one of the thousands of Jews who fled to Sweden. For the rest of the war she worked for the biologist John Runnström at the Wenner-Gren Institute for Experimental Biology in Stockholm.

== Later life ==
When the war ended, de Hevesy elected to stay in Sweden, and Bohr decided to drop biological research at the institute and return to concentrating on physics. Levi accepted a position at the Zoophysiological Laboratory in Copenhagen, under August Krogh, who, like Bohr, had won a Nobel Prize. She spent the 1947–48 academic year in the United States as a Fellow of the American Association of University Women. While there, she learned from Willard Libby at the University of Chicago about his recently discovered technique of radiocarbon dating. She developed the new technique of autoradiography while working for the United States Atomic Energy Commission at the University of Rochester in Rochester, New York.

On returning to Denmark, she worked with the National Museum of Denmark in Copenhagen to develop radiocarbon dating equipment. This was put to the test in 1951, dating the Grauballe Man. Autoradiography was then used by the Finsen Institute to investigate the effects of the radiocontrast agent thorotrast. Levi was a consultant at the Danish National Board of Health from 1952 to 1970.

Levi retired from the Zoophysiological Laboratory in 1979, but became involved with the Niels Bohr Archive, where she collected papers from de Hevesy. The result of this work was a biography of Hevesy, which was published in 1985. That year she organised the Niels Bohr Centennial Exhibition at the Copenhagen Town Hall. In 2001, she was honoured by the Humboldt University of Berlin (previously the Friedrich Wilhelm University of Berlin), along with other students who had been dismissed in 1933. She died in Copenhagen on 26 July 2003.
