= Inge Edler =

Swedish cardiologist (1911–2001)

Inge Gudmar Edler
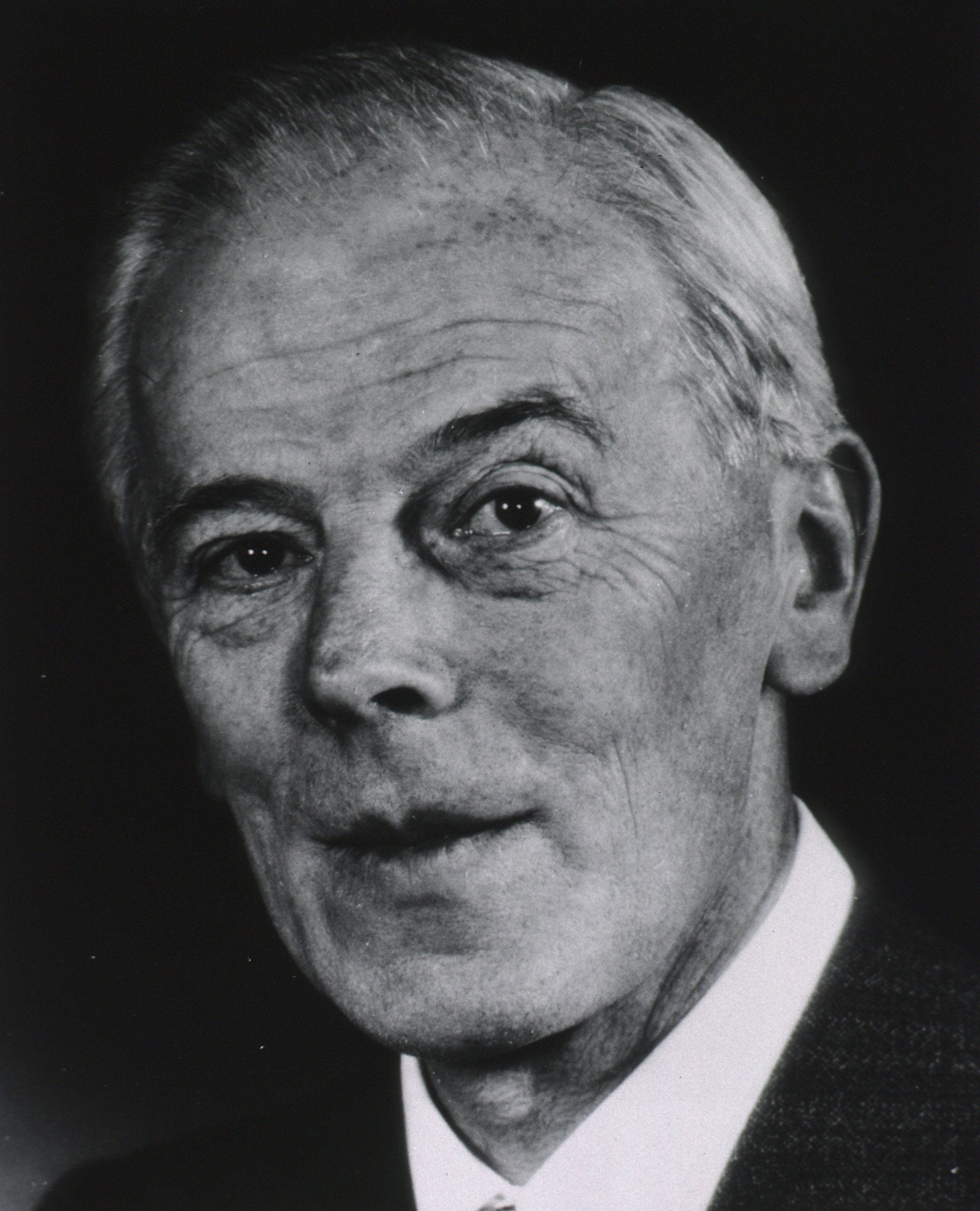
- Born: March 17, 1911; Burlöv, Malmöhus County, Sweden
- Died: March 7, 2001 (aged 89)
- Occupation: Cardiologist
- Known for: Early development of echocardiography

Inge Gudmar Edler (17 March 1911 – 6 March 2001) was a Swedish cardiologist, who in collaboration with Carl Hellmuth Hertz developed medical ultrasonography and echocardiography.

Edler and Hertz shared the 1977 Lasker-DeBakey Clinical Medical Research Award for this achievement.

== Early life and education ==
Edler was born on 17 March 1911 in Burlöv, Malmöhus County, Sweden. His parents were Carl and Sophia Edler and primary school teachers. In childhood, he was interested in technology, nature, and geography. Edler graduated from high school, Hegre Allmanna Laroverket, in 1930. Edler's older sister was a dentist and he initially intended to pursue a career in this field. As it was too late in the year to enroll in dental school, instead he enrolled in medical school at Lund University. Edler graduated from medical school in 1943.

== Personal life ==
Edler met his future wife, Karin Jungebeck, in 1939 at medical school as she was also a medical student at the same university. They had 4 children.

Edler died 7 March 2001 at home.
