= Carl Hellmuth Hertz =

German physicist (1920–1990)

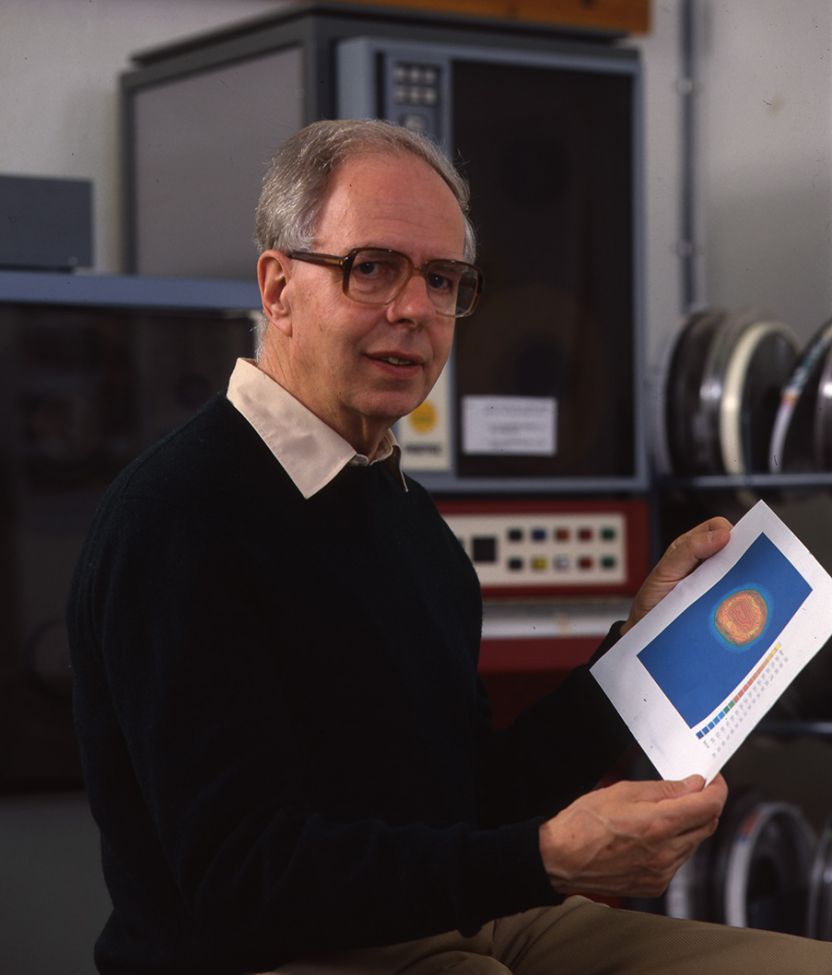
- Sydsvenska Medicinhistoriska Sällskapet (SMHS), Sweden, 1985
- Born: 15 October 1920; Berlin, Germany
- Died: 29 April 1990 (aged 69); Lund, Sweden
- Education: Technische Universität Berlin
- Known for: Inkjet; Sonography
- Children: Thomas and Hans Hertz
- Scientific career
- Fields: Physics
- Workplaces: University of Lund

Carl Hellmuth Hertz (also written Helmut; 15 October 1920 – 29 April 1990) was a German physicist known primarily for being involved in the development of inkjet technology and ultrasound technology. He was the son of Gustav Ludwig Hertz and great nephew of Heinrich Hertz.

== Biography ==
Hellmuth Hertz was born on 15 October 1920 in Berlin, Germany. His father was Gustav Hertz who, along with James Franck, was awarded the Nobel Prize in Physics 1925 for their experiments on inelastic electron collisions in gases. Gustav Hertz's uncle was in turn Heinrich Hertz, who first conclusively proved the existence of the electromagnetic waves.

Hellmuth graduated from the elite Schule Schloss Salem boarding school in 1939 at the age of 19 years with the highest grade in mathematics and physics. The same year, he was conscripted into the German Army (Wehrmacht) and served as a soldier for Nazi Germany in World War II. In 1943 he was captured in the North African theatre by US troops and brought to America, where he was placed in a prisoner-of-war camp until 1946. Because his father did some research in the Soviet Union at that time, he could not get a job in the US. Instead, he got a job at the Department of Physics in Lund University in Sweden with the assistance of James Franck and the Nobel laureate Niels Bohr, who were both friends of Gustav Hertz.

From 1961 he was a teacher at Lund University, and from 1963 he was Professor of Electrical Measurement Technology in Lund. He was involved in the development of both the inkjet and the ultrasound technology. He produced the first echocardiographs together with the Swedish physician Inge Edler. He was married to Birgit Nordbring and was the father of Thomas and Hans Hertz, and he died on 29 April 1990.
