= Birgit Nordbring-Hertz =

Swedish scientist (1923–2020)

- Born: Birgit Ann-Marie Nordbring; 1923
- Died: March 16, 2020 (aged 96)
- Education: Lund University
- Scientific career
- Thesis: Nematode-trapping organs in the fungus arthrobotrys oligospora : formation, structure and function (1974)

Birgit Ann-Marie Margareta Nordbring-Hertz, (16 May 1923 – 16 March 2020 in Lund, Sweden) was a Swedish scientist at Lund University known for her work on the interactions between fungi and nematodes.

== Education ==
Nordbring-Hertz graduated with a medical licentiate degree with a thesis on the opportunistic human pathogenic fungus, Candida albicans, 1956 at Lund University, and received a doctorate in microbiology in 1974 at the same university, working on nematode-trapping fungi. After her doctorate she took over responsibility for the department of microbial ecology, a position she held from 1975 until 1989. In 1987, she was promoted to professor at Lund University, and in 1989 she transitioned to an emeritus position. She was the first female professor at the natural science faculty at Lund University.

== Research ==
Nordbring-Hertz's research mainly dealt with a type of microfungi, so-called nematophagous fungi, that infect and digest nematodes. She concentrated on the nematode-trapping fungus Arthrobotrys oligospora. Nordbring-Hertz used scanning electron microscopy to study the trapping organs of A. oligospora. Her early research was concentrated on how trapping organs were induced, apart from nematode touching the hyphae also chemically by small peptides will induce trap formation. Her work was later focussed on specific recognition mechanisms, e.g. by lectins (carbohydrate-binding glycoproteins) on the trap surface that recognise specific carbohydrates on the nematode surface and start the infection process. Her research also examined volatile exudates from nematodes, the fungal plant pathogen Verticillium dahliae, and quantifying the presence of the fungus in soil ecosystems.

== Selected publications ==
- Nordbring-Hertz, Birgit (1972). "Scanning Electron Microscopy of the Nematode-trapping Organs in Arthrobotrys oligospora". Physiologia Plantarum. 26 (2): 279–284. Bibcode:1972PPlan..26..279N. doi:10.1111/j.1399-3054.1972.tb03581.x. ISSN 1399-3054.
- Nordbring-Hertz, Birgit (1977). "Nematode-Induced Morphogenesis in the Predacious Fungus Arthrobotrys oligospora". Nematologica. 23 (4): 443–451. doi:10.1163/187529277X00372.
- Nordbring-Hertz, Birgit; Mattiasson, Bo (October 1979). "Action of a nematode-trapping fungus shows lectin-mediated host–microorganism interaction". Nature. 281 (5731): 477–479. Bibcode:1979Natur.281..477N. doi:10.1038/281477a0. S2CID 4339747.
- Nordbring-Hertz, Birgit (August 2004). "Morphogenesis in the nematode-trapping fungus Arthrobotrys oligospora - an extensive plasticity of infection structures". Mycologist. 18 (3): 125–133. doi:10.1017/S0269915X04003052. ISSN 1474-0605.
- Nordbring-Hertz, Birgit; Jansson, Hans-Börje; Tunlid, Anders (2011). "Nematophagous Fungi". Encyclopedia of Life Sciences. John Wiley & Sons. doi:10.1002/9780470015902.a0000374.pub3. ISBN 9780470016176.

== Personal life ==
Nordbring-Hertz married in 1953 to a professor in electrical measurement technology, Hellmuth Hertz, and they had two sons, Thomas and Hans Hertz.
