= Gustav Ludwig Hertz =

German physicist (1887–1975)

Gustav Hertz
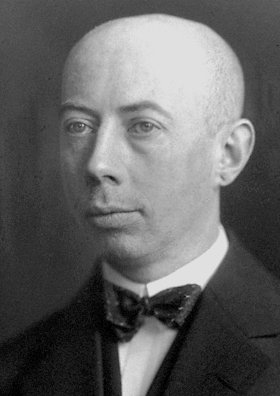
- Hertz in 1925
- Born: 22 July 1887; Hamburg, German Empire
- Died: 30 October 1975 (aged 88); East Berlin, East Germany
- Resting place: Ohlsdorf Cemetery, Hamburg
- Education: Friedrich Wilhelm University of Berlin (grad. 1911)
- Known for: Franck–Hertz experiment
- Spouses: Ellen Dihlmann (m. 1919; died 1941) Charlotte Jollasse (m. 1943)
- Children: 2, including Carl
- Relatives: Gustav Ferdinand Hertz (grandfather); Heinrich Hertz (uncle); Mathilde Hertz (cousin)
- Awards: Nobel Prize in Physics (1925); Max Planck Medal (1951); Stalin Prize (1951)
- Scientific career
- Fields: Physics
- Workplaces: Friedrich Wilhelm University of Berlin; Philips; University of Halle; Technische Hochschule Berlin; Siemens; Leipzig University
- Thesis: Über das ultrarote Adsorptionsspektrum der Kohlensäure in seiner Abhängigkeit von Druck und Partialdruck (1911)
- Doctoral advisor: Heinrich Rubens
- Doctoral students: Heinz Barwich; Erwin Müller; Heinz Pose; Wilhelm Walcher
- Other notable students: Werner Hartmann; Fritz Houtermans

Gustav Ludwig Hertz (German: [ˈɡʊstaf ˈluːtvɪç ˈhɛʁts]; 22 July 1887 – 30 October 1975) was a German experimental physicist who shared the 1925 Nobel Prize in Physics with James Franck "for their discovery of the laws governing the impact of an electron upon an atom."

== Biography ==
=== Education and career ===
Gustav Ludwig Hertz was born on 22 July 1887 in Hamburg, Germany, the son of Gustav Theodor Hertz, a lawyer, and Auguste Arning. He attended the Gelehrtenschule des Johanneums before studying at the University of Göttingen (1906–1907), the Ludwig-Maximilians-Universität München (1907–1908), and the Friedrich Wilhelm University of Berlin (1908–1911). He received his Ph.D. in 1911 under Heinrich Rubens.

In 1913, Hertz was appointed Research Assistant at the Physics Institute of the Friedrich Wilhelm University of Berlin. The following year, Hertz, along with James Franck, performed an experiment on inelastic electron collisions in gases. In 1925, Hertz and Franck were jointly awarded the Nobel Prize in Physics for their experiment.

From 1914, Hertz served in the military during World War I. In 1915, he joined Fritz Haber's unit that would introduce poisonous chlorine gas as a weapon. He was seriously wounded that year. In 1917, he returned to the Friedrich Wilhelm University of Berlin as a Privatdozent. In 1920, he became a research physicist at the Philips Incandescent Lamp Factory in Eindhoven. In 1925, he was appointed Director of the Physics Institute at the University of Halle. In 1928, he became Director of the Physics Institute at Technische Hochschule Berlin (THB). While there, he developed an isotope separation technique via gaseous diffusion.

Since Hertz was an officer during World War I, he was temporarily protected from Nazi policies and the Law for the Restoration of the Professional Civil Service, but eventually the policies and laws became more stringent, and at the end of 1934 he was forced to resign from his position at THB, as he was classified as a "second degree part-Jew" (his grandfather, Gustav Ferdinand Hertz, had been Jewish as a child, before his whole family had converted to Lutheranism in 1834). Hertz was part of ArbeitsGemeinschaft Cornelius (AGC) working group since 1939. To 1935 to 1945, he continued his work on gas discharges, electron-atomic physics, ultrasound, and basic research and development for a cyclotron circular accelerator for possible use in the research facilities at Heidelberg University and Leipzig University, but he eventually discontinued his work on isotope separation. In April 1944, he became Director of Research Laboratory II at Siemens. He stayed at Siemens until 1945 when he departed to the Soviet Union.

=== Soviet Union ===
==== "Pact to defect" ====
Hertz was concerned for his safety and, like his fellow Nobel laureate James Franck, was looking to move to the US or any other place outside Germany. So he made a pact with three colleagues: Manfred von Ardenne, director of his private laboratory Forschungslaboratorium für Elektronenphysik, Peter Adolf Thiessen, ordinarius professor at the Friedrich Wilhelm University of Berlin and Director of the Kaiser Wilhelm Institute for Physical Chemistry and Electrochemistry in Berlin-Dahlem, and Max Volmer, ordinarius professor and Director of the Physical Chemistry Institute at THB. The pact was a pledge that whoever first made contact with the Soviets would speak for the rest. The objectives of their pact were threefold: (1) prevent plunder of their institutes, (2) continue their work with minimal interruption, and (3) protect themselves from prosecution for any political acts of the past. Before the end of World War II, Thiessen, a member of the Nazi Party, had Communist contacts.

==== Soviet nuclear weapons program ====
On 27 April 1945, Thiessen arrived at von Ardenne's institute in an armored vehicle with a major of the Soviet Army, who was also a leading Soviet chemist. All four of the pact members were taken to the Soviet Union. Hertz was made head of Institute G, in Agudseri (Agudzery), about 10 km southeast of Sukhumi and a suburb of Gul'rips (Gulrip'shi). Topics assigned to Gustav Hertz's Institute G included: (1) Separation of isotopes by diffusion in a flow of inert gases, for which Gustav Hertz was the leader, (2) Development of a condensation pump, for which Justus Mühlenpfordt was the leader, (3) Design and build a mass spectrometer for determining the isotopic composition of uranium, for which Werner Schütze was the leader, (4) Development of frameless (ceramic) diffusion partitions for filters, for which Reinhold Reichmann was the leader, and (5) Development of a theory of stability and control of a diffusion cascade, for which Heinz Barwich was the leader;

Barwich had been deputy to Hertz at Siemens. Other members of Institute G were Werner Hartmann and Karl-Franz Zühlke. Manfred von Ardenne was made head of Institute A. Goals of von Ardenne's Institute A included: (1) Electromagnetic separation of isotopes, for which von Ardenne was the leader, (2) Techniques for manufacturing porous barriers for isotope separation, for which Peter Adolf Thiessen was the leader, and (3) Molecular techniques for separation of uranium isotopes, for which Max Steenbeck was the leader.

In his first meeting with Lavrentij Beria, von Ardenne was asked to participate in building the bomb, but von Ardenne quickly realized that participation would prohibit his repatriation to Germany, so he suggested isotope enrichment as an objective, which was agreed to.

==== Research in Sukhumi ====
By the end of the 1940s, nearly 300 Germans were working at the institute, and they were not the total work force. Institute A was used as the basis for the Sukhumi Physical-Technical Institute in Sinop, a suburb of Sukhumi. Volmer went to the Scientific Research Institute No. 9 (NII-9) in Moscow; he was given a design bureau to work on the production of heavy water. In Institute A, Thiessen became leader for developing techniques for manufacturing porous barriers for isotope separation.

In 1949, six German scientists, including Hertz, Thiessen, and Barwich were called in for consultation at Sverdlovsk-44, which was responsible for uranium enrichment. The plant, smaller than the American Oak Ridge gaseous diffusion plant, was getting only a little over half of the expected 90% or higher enrichment.

In 1950, Hertz moved to Moscow. In 1951, he was awarded the Stalin Prize, second class, with Barwich. The same year, Hertz and James Franck were jointly awarded the Max Planck Medal by the German Physical Society.

=== Later life and death ===
From 1954 until his retirement in 1961, Hertz was Director of the Physics Institute of the Karl Marx University in Leipzig (now Leipzig University). From 1955 to 1967, he was Chairman of the Physical Society of East Germany.

Hertz died on 30 October 1975 in Berlin at the age of 88.

== Family ==
Hertz was a nephew of physicist Heinrich Hertz and a cousin of biologist Mathilde Hertz. In 1919, he married Ellen Dihlmann, who died in 1941. They had two sons, Carl and Johannes; both became physicists. He remarried in 1943 to Charlotte Jollasse.

== Scientific memberships ==
Hertz was a Member of the German Academy of Sciences in Berlin, a Corresponding Member of the Göttingen Academy of Sciences, an Honorary Member of the Hungarian Academy of Sciences, a Member of the Czechoslovak Academy of Sciences, and a Foreign Member of the USSR Academy of Sciences.

== Publications ==
- Franck, J.; Hertz, G. (1914). "Über Zusammenstöße zwischen Elektronen und Molekülen des Quecksilberdampfes und die Ionisierungsspannung desselben". Verh. Dtsch. Phys. Ges. 16: 457–467.
- Gustav Hertz Über das ultrarote Adsorptionsspektrum der Kohlensäure in seiner Abhängigkeit von Druck und Partialdruck. (Dissertation). (Vieweg Braunschweig, 1911)
- Gustav Hertz (editor) Lehrbuch der Kernphysik I-III (Teubner, 1961–1966)
- Gustav Hertz (editor) Grundlagen und Arbeitsmethoden der Kernphysik (Akademie Verlag, 1957)
- Gustav Hertz Gustav Hertz in der Entwicklung der modernen Physik (Akademie Verlag, 1967)

== See also ==
- Electron diffraction
- Electric glow discharge
- Franck–Hertz experiment
- Plasma window
- Vacuum tube
- Scattering
- Russian Alsos
