= Hans Gaffron =

German-American biochemist

- Born: May 17, 1902; Lima, Peru
- Died: August 18, 1979 (aged 77); Falmouth, Massachusetts, USA
- Occupations: Chemist, Biologist
- Spouse: Clara Ostendorf (m. 1932–1979)

Hans Gaffron (May 17, 1902 – August 18, 1979) was a German chemist. He was one of the earlier researchers trying to elucidate the mechanistic and biochemical details of photosynthesis and plant metabolism. His most notable finding was the discovery of a process whereby unicellular green algae can produce molecular Hydrogen (H2) in the presence of light, and that the precursors were derived from photosynthetic water-splitting. Applications based on his work have led to many efforts to develop H2 as a renewable biofuel.

He was a son of the German physician Eduard Gaffron and his wife Hedwig von Gevekot.

== Works ==
- Research in Photosynthesis. New York, Interscience Publ., 1957. OCLC 252395040
- Photosynthesis. Boston, Heath, 1965. OCLC 3038933
