= J. J. Nickson =

American physician and radiation oncologist

James Joseph Nickson, MD (1915–1985) was an American physician and radiation oncologist. He was chairman of radiation therapy at Michael Reese Hospital in Chicago and the director of the cancer center of the Center for Health Sciences at the University of Tennessee.

He received his BS from University of Washington (1936) MD Johns Hopkins (1940). He worked on the Manhattan Project as medical officer during World War II.

Later he worked at Memorial Sloan Kettering Hospital (chairman of Dept of Radiation Therapy), Michael Reese Hospital and University of Tennessee Medical Center at Memphis.

He died in 1985.
