= Gustav Ferdinand Hertz =

German politician and judge (1827–1914)

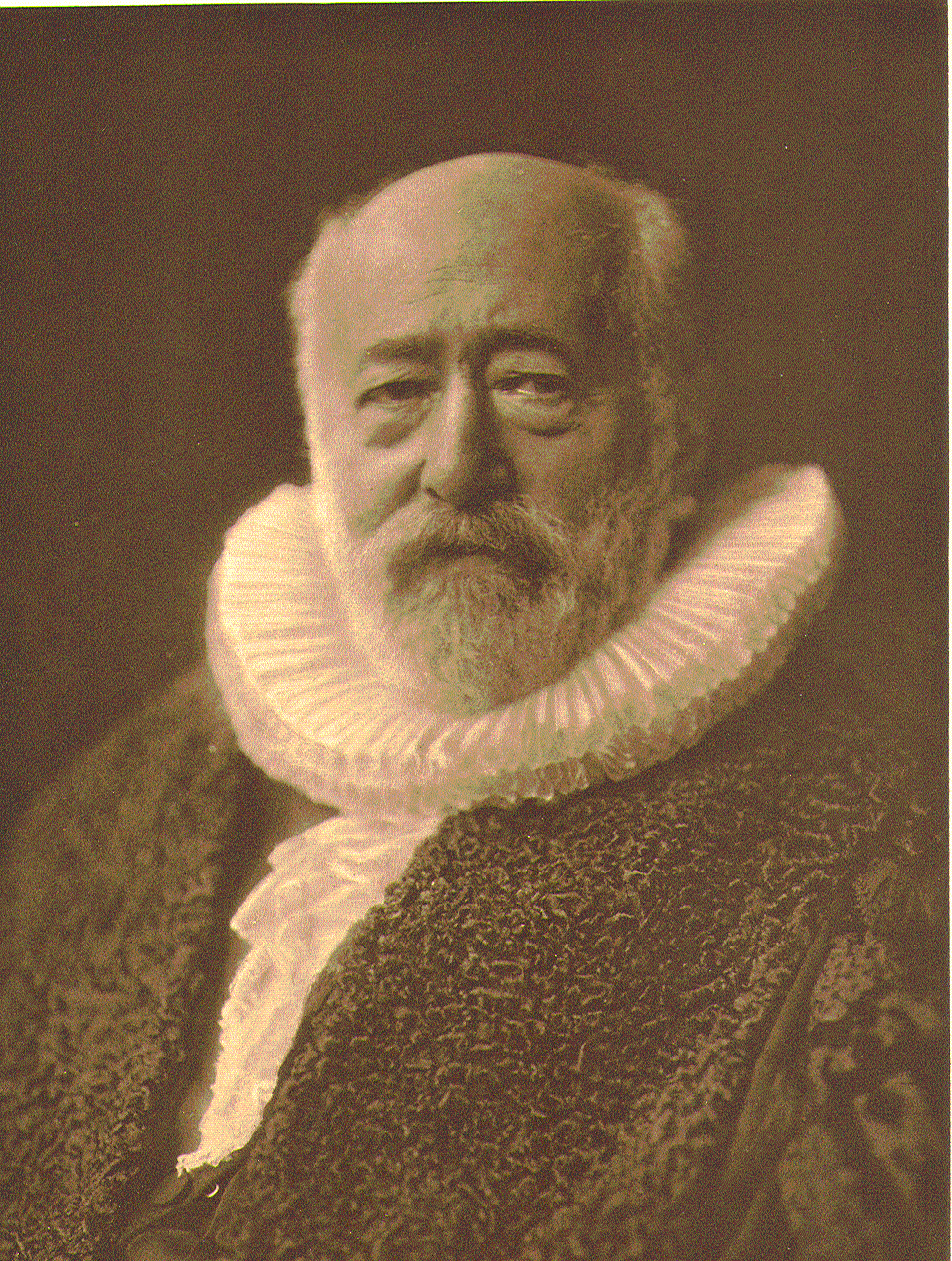
Gustav F. Hertz (1904)

Gustav Ferdinand Hertz (born David Gustav Hertz, August 2, 1827, Hamburg – September 8, 1914, Hamburg) was a German lawyer and senator of the Free Imperial City of Hamburg. He was the father of the pioneering physicist Heinrich Hertz.

Hertz converted from Judaism to Lutheranism upon marrying Anna Elisabeth Pfefferkorn, the daughter of a Lutheran minister.
