= Heinrich Hertz =

German physicist (1857–1894)

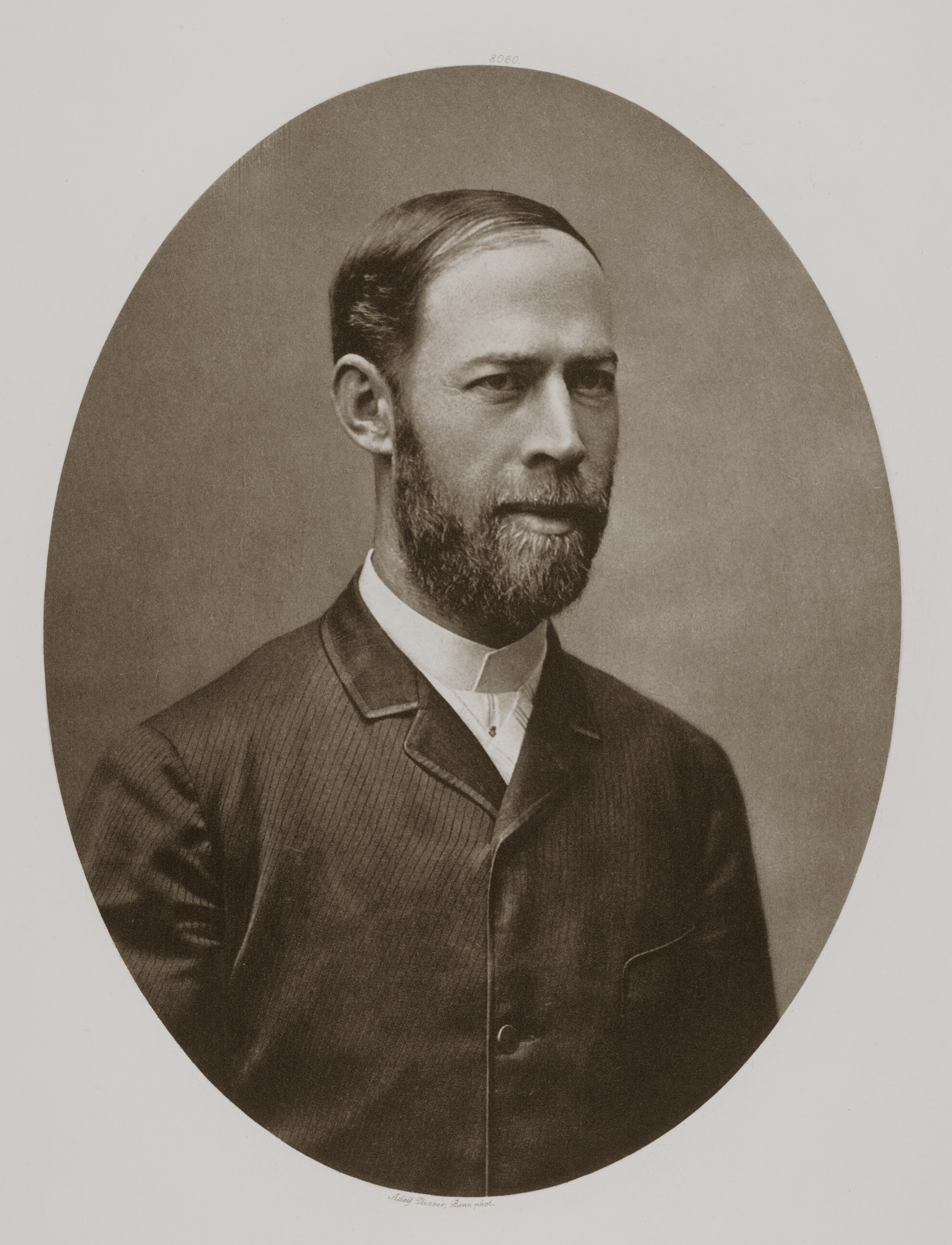
- Hertz, c. 1890
- Born: Heinrich Rudolf Hertz; 22 February 1857; Hamburg, German Confederation
- Died: 1 January 1894 (aged 36); Bonn, Kingdom of Prussia, German Empire
- Resting place: Ohlsdorf Cemetery, Hamburg
- Education: Johanneum Gymnasium; Technische Hochschule Munich; University of Berlin (Dr. phil.)
- Known for: Founding contact mechanics (1881); Work on cathode rays (1883, 1892); Discovering radio waves (1886); Discovering the photoelectric effect (1887); Inventing the parabolic antenna (1888)
- Spouse: Elisabeth Doll (m. 1886)
- Children: 2, including Mathilde
- Father: Gustav Ferdinand Hertz
- Relatives: Gustav Ludwig Hertz (nephew)
- Awards: Matteucci Medal (1888); Rumford Medal (1890)
- Scientific career
- Fields: Electromagnetism; Mechanics
- Workplaces: University of Kiel (1883–85); Technische Hochschule Karlsruhe (1885–89); University of Bonn (1889–94)
- Thesis: Über die Induction in rotirenden Kugeln (On induction in rotating spheres) (1880)
- Doctoral advisor: Hermann von Helmholtz
- Other academic advisors: Wilhelm von Bezold; Gustav Kirchhoff
- Notable students: Vilhelm Bjerknes; Josef von Geitler-Armingen; Philipp Lenard; Udny Yule

Heinrich Rudolf Hertz (/hɜːrts/ hurts; German: [hɛʁts]; 22 February 1857 – 1 January 1894) was a German physicist who first conclusively proved the existence of the electromagnetic waves proposed by James Clerk Maxwell's equations of electromagnetism.

== Biography ==
Heinrich Rudolf Hertz was born on 22 February 1857 in Hamburg, the son of Gustav Ferdinand Hertz, a lawyer and politician, and Anna Elisabeth Pfefferkorn.

While studying at the Gelehrtenschule des Johanneums in Hamburg, Hertz showed an aptitude for sciences as well as languages, learning Arabic. He studied sciences and engineering in the German cities of Dresden, Munich, and Berlin, where he studied under Gustav Kirchhoff and Hermann von Helmholtz. In 1880, Hertz obtained his Ph.D. from the University of Berlin, and for the next three years remained for post-doctoral study under Helmholtz, serving as his assistant. In 1883, Hertz took a post as a lecturer in theoretical physics at the University of Kiel. In 1885, Hertz became a full professor at the University of Karlsruhe.

In 1886, Hertz married Elisabeth Doll, the daughter of Max Doll, a lecturer in geometry at Karlsruhe. They had two daughters: Johanna, born on 20 October 1887, and Mathilde, born on 14 January 1891, who went on to become a notable biologist. During this time, Hertz conducted his landmark research into electromagnetic waves.

Hertz became a professor of physics and director of the physics institute at the University of Bonn on 3 April 1889, a position he held until his death. During this time, he worked on theoretical mechanics with his work published in the book Die Prinzipien der Mechanik in neuem Zusammenhange dargestellt (The Principles of Mechanics Presented in a New Form), published posthumously in 1894.

== Scientific work ==
=== Electromagnetic waves ===
Hertz's 1887 apparatus for generating and detecting radio waves: a spark-gap transmitter (left) consisting of a dipole antenna with a spark gap (S) powered by high voltage pulses from a Ruhmkorff coil (T), and a receiver (right) consisting of a loop antenna and spark gap.

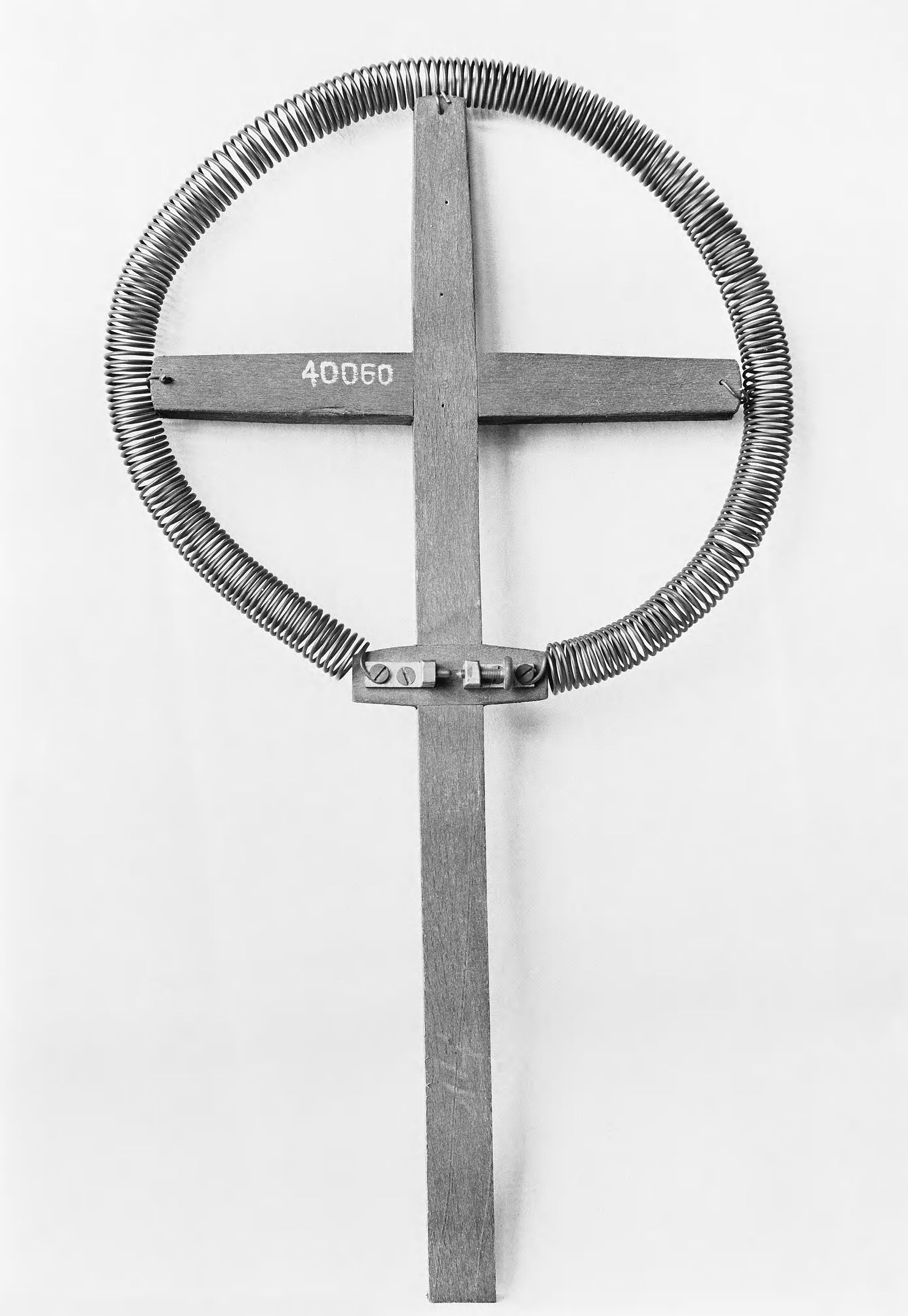
One of Hertz's radio wave receivers: a loop antenna with an adjustable spark micrometer (bottom).

In 1864, Scottish mathematical physicist James Clerk Maxwell proposed a comprehensive theory of electromagnetism, now called Maxwell's equations. Maxwell's theory predicted that coupled electric and magnetic fields could travel through space as an "electromagnetic wave". Maxwell proposed that light consisted of electromagnetic waves of short wavelength, but no one had been able to prove this, or generate or detect electromagnetic waves of other wavelengths.

During Hertz's studies in 1879, Helmholtz suggested that Hertz's doctoral dissertation be on testing Maxwell's theory. Helmholtz had also proposed the "Berlin Prize" problem that year at the Prussian Academy of Sciences for anyone who could experimentally prove an electromagnetic effect in the polarization and depolarization of insulators, something predicted by Maxwell's theory. Helmholtz was sure Hertz was the most likely candidate to win it. Not seeing any way to build an apparatus to experimentally test this, Hertz believed it was too difficult, and worked on electromagnetic induction instead. Hertz did produce an analysis of Maxwell's equations during his time at Kiel, showing they did have more validity than the then prevalent "action at a distance" theories.

In the autumn of 1886, after Hertz received his professorship at Karlsruhe, he was experimenting with a pair of Riess spirals when he noticed that discharging a Leyden jar into one of these coils produced a spark in the other coil. With an idea on how to build an apparatus, Hertz now had a way to proceed with the "Berlin Prize" problem of 1879 on proving Maxwell's theory (although the actual prize had expired uncollected in 1882). He used a dipole antenna consisting of two collinear one-meter wires with a spark gap between their inner ends, and zinc spheres attached to the outer ends for capacitance, as a radiator. The antenna was excited by pulses of high voltage of about 30 kilovolts applied between the two sides from a Ruhmkorff coil. He received the waves with a resonant single-loop antenna with a micrometer spark gap between the ends. This experiment produced and received what are now called radio waves in the very high frequency range.

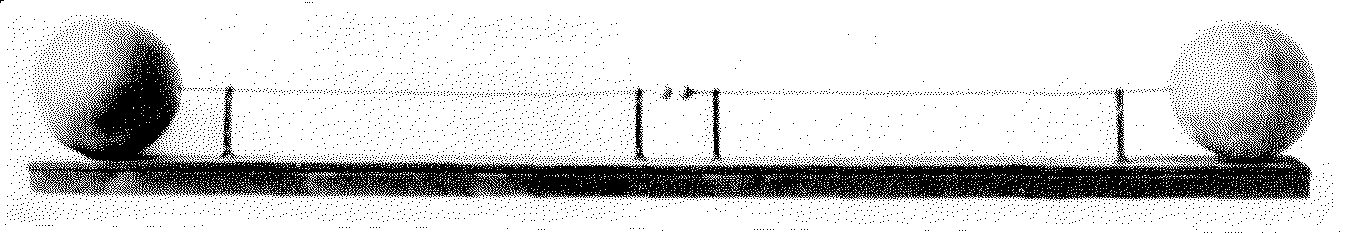
Hertz's first radio transmitter: a capacitance loaded dipole resonator consisting of a pair of one-meter copper wires with a 7.5 mm spark gap between them, ending in 30 cm zinc spheres. When an induction coil applied a high voltage between the two sides, sparks across the spark gap created standing waves of radio frequency current in the wires, which radiated radio waves. The frequency of the waves was roughly 50 MHz, about that used in modern television transmitters.

Between 1886 and 1889 Hertz conducted a series of experiments that would prove the effects he was observing were results of Maxwell's predicted electromagnetic waves. Starting in November 1887 with his paper "On Electromagnetic Effects Produced by Electrical Disturbances in Insulators", Hertz sent a series of papers to Helmholtz at the Berlin Academy, including papers in 1888 that showed transverse free space electromagnetic waves traveling at a finite speed over a distance. In the apparatus Hertz used, the electric and magnetic fields radiated away from the wires as transverse waves. Hertz had positioned the oscillator about 12 meters from a zinc reflecting plate to produce standing waves. Each wave was about 4 meters long. Using the ring detector, he recorded how the wave's magnitude and component direction varied. Hertz measured Maxwell's waves and demonstrated that the velocity of these waves was equal to the velocity of light. The electric field intensity, polarization, and reflection of the waves were also measured by Hertz. These experiments established that light and these waves were both forms of electromagnetic radiation obeying the Maxwell equations.

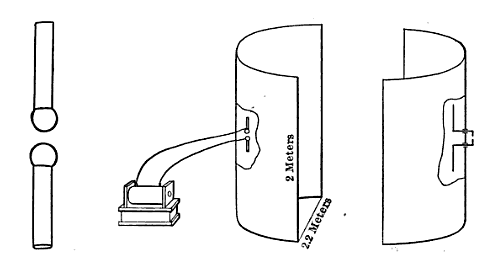
Hertz's directional spark transmitter (center), a half-wave dipole antenna made of two 13 cm brass rods with spark gap at center (closeup left) powered by a Ruhmkorff coil, on focal line of a 1.2 m x 2 m cylindrical sheet metal parabolic reflector. It radiated a beam of 66 cm waves with a frequency of about 450 MHz. Receiver (right) is a similar parabolic dipole antenna with micrometer spark gap.

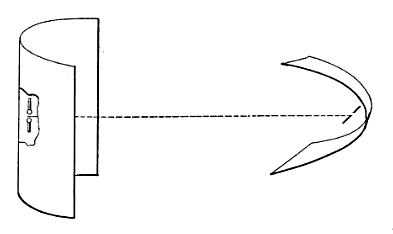
Hertz's demonstration of polarization of radio waves: the receiver does not respond when antennas are perpendicular as shown, but as the receiver is rotated, the received signal grows stronger (as shown by the length of sparks) until it reaches a maximum when dipoles are parallel.

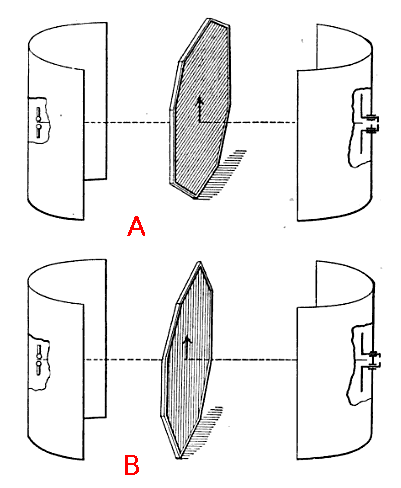
Another demonstration of polarization: waves pass through polarizing filter to the receiver only when the wires are perpendicular to dipoles (A), not when parallel (B).

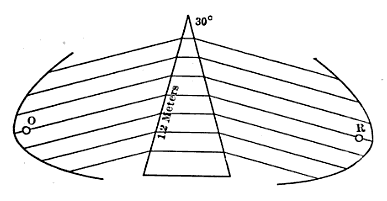
Demonstration of refraction: radio waves bend when passing through a prism made of pitch, similarly to light waves when passing through a glass prism.

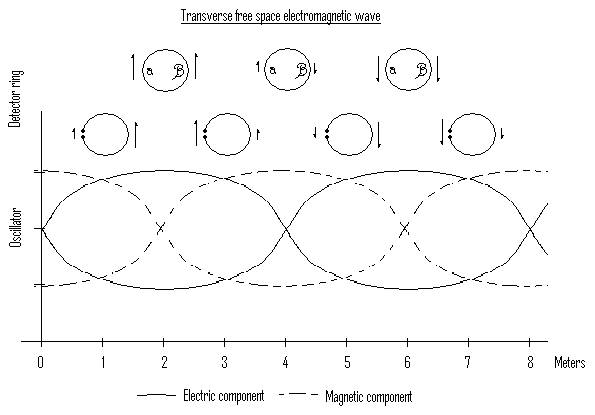
Hertz's plot of standing waves created when radio waves are reflected from a sheet of metal

Hertz did not realize the practical importance of his radio wave experiments. He stated that,

It's of no use whatsoever ... this is just an experiment that proves Maestro Maxwell was right—we just have these mysterious electromagnetic waves that we cannot see with the naked eye. But they are there.

Asked about the applications of his discoveries, Hertz replied,

Nothing, I guess.

Hertz's proof of the existence of airborne electromagnetic waves led to an explosion of experimentation with this new form of electromagnetic radiation, which was called "Hertzian waves" until around 1910, when the term "radio waves" became current. Within 6 years Guglielmo Marconi began developing a radio wave based wireless telegraphy system, leading to the wide use of radio communication.

=== Cathode rays ===
In 1883, Hertz tried to prove that the cathode rays are electrically neutral and got what he interpreted as a confident absence of deflection in an electrostatic field. However, as J. J. Thomson explained in 1897, Hertz placed the deflecting electrodes in a highly-conductive area of the tube, resulting in a strong screening effect close to their surface.

Nine years later, Hertz began experimenting and demonstrated that cathode rays could penetrate very thin metal foil (such as aluminium). Philipp Lenard, a student of Heinrich Hertz, further researched this "ray effect". He developed a version of the cathode tube and studied the penetration by X-rays of various materials. However, Lenard did not realize that he was producing X-rays. Hermann von Helmholtz formulated mathematical equations for X-rays. He postulated a dispersion theory before Röntgen made his discovery and announcement. It was formed on the basis of the electromagnetic theory of light (Wiedmann's Annalen, Vol. XLVIII). However, he did not work with actual X-rays.

=== Photoelectric effect ===
Hertz helped establish the photoelectric effect (which was later explained by Albert Einstein) when he noticed that a charged object loses its charge more readily when illuminated by ultraviolet radiation (UV). In 1887, he made observations of the photoelectric effect and of the production and reception of electromagnetic (EM) waves, published in the journal Annalen der Physik. His receiver consisted of a coil with a spark gap, whereby a spark would be seen upon detection of EM waves. He placed the apparatus in a darkened box to see the spark better. He observed that the maximum spark length was reduced when in the box. A glass panel placed between the source of EM waves and the receiver absorbed UV that assisted the electrons in jumping across the gap. When removed, the spark length would increase. He observed no decrease in spark length when he substituted quartz for glass, as quartz does not absorb UV radiation. Hertz concluded his months of investigation and reported the results obtained. He did not further pursue investigation of this effect, nor did he make any attempt at explaining how the observed phenomenon was brought about.

=== Contact mechanics ===
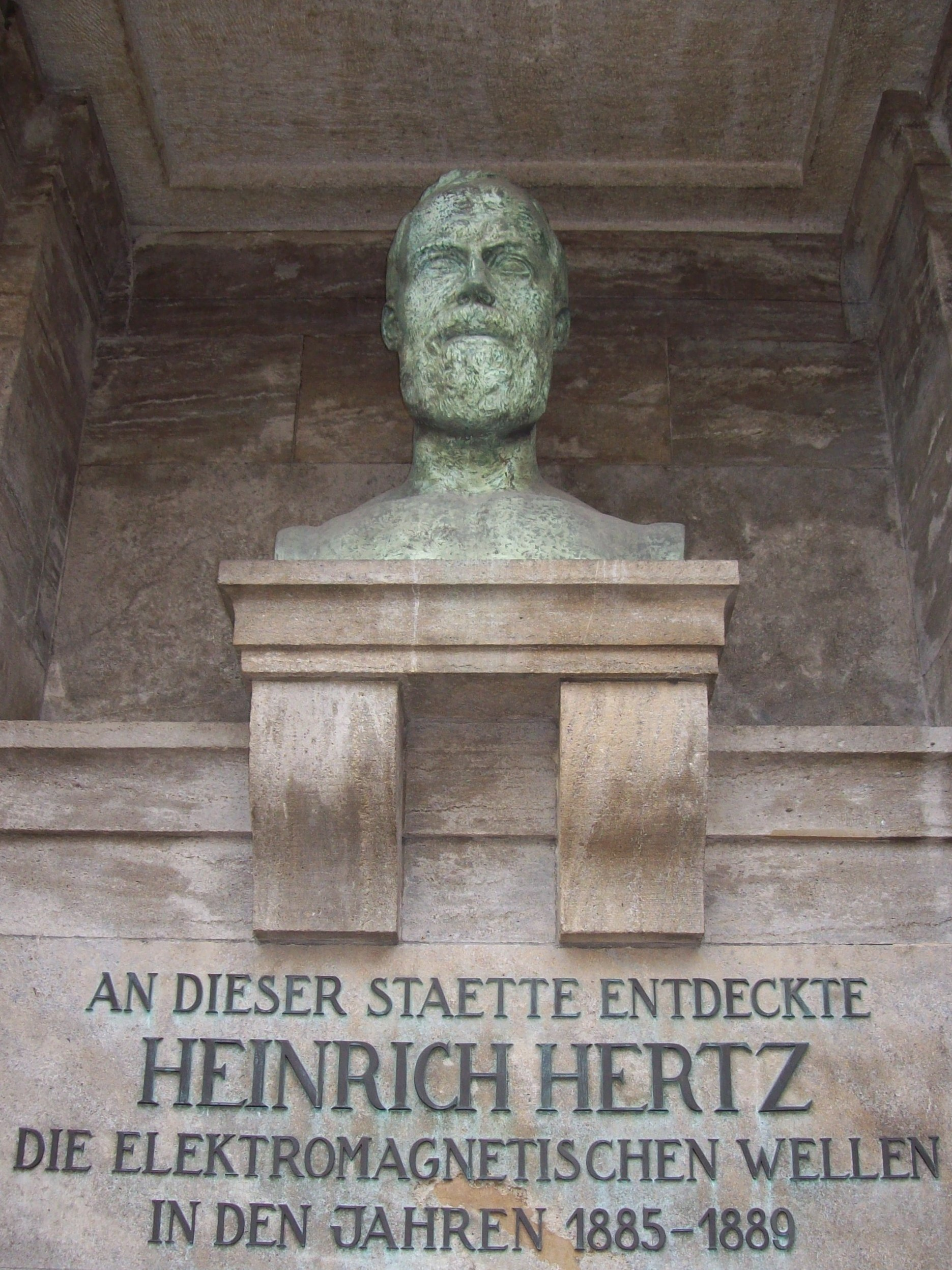
Memorial of Heinrich Hertz on the campus of the Karlsruhe Institute of Technology, which translates as At this site, Heinrich Hertz discovered electromagnetic waves in the years 1885–1889

In 1881 and 1882, Hertz published two articles on what was to become known as the field of contact mechanics, which proved to be an important basis for later theories in the field. Joseph Valentin Boussinesq published some critically important observations on Hertz's work, nevertheless establishing this work on contact mechanics as of immense importance. His work basically summarises how two axi-symmetric objects placed in contact will behave under loading, he obtained results based upon the classical theory of elasticity and continuum mechanics. The most significant flaw of his theory was the neglect of any nature of adhesion between the two solids, which proves to be important as the materials composing the solids start to assume high elasticity. It was natural to neglect adhesion at the time, however, as there were no experimental methods of testing for it.

To develop his theory, Hertz used his observation of elliptical Newton's rings formed upon placing a glass sphere upon a lens as the basis of assuming that the pressure exerted by the sphere follows an elliptical distribution. He used the formation of Newton's rings again while validating his theory with experiments in calculating the displacement which the sphere has into the lens. Kenneth L. Johnson, K. Kendall, and A. D. Roberts (JKR) used this theory as a basis while calculating the theoretical displacement or indentation depth in the presence of adhesion in 1971. Hertz's theory is recovered from their formulation if the adhesion of the materials is assumed to be zero. Similar to this theory, however, using different assumptions, B. V. Derjaguin, V. M. Muller, and Y. P. Toporov published another theory in 1975, which came to be known as the DMT theory in the research community, which also recovered Hertz's formulations under the assumption of zero adhesion. This DMT theory proved to be premature and needed several revisions before it came to be accepted as another material contact theory in addition to the JKR theory. Both the DMT and the JKR theories form the basis of contact mechanics upon which all transition contact models are based and used in material parameter prediction in nanoindentation and atomic force microscopy. These models are central to the field of tribology and he was named as one of the 23 "Men of Tribology" by Duncan Dowson. Despite preceding his great work on electromagnetism (which he himself considered with his characteristic soberness to be trivial), Hertz's research on contact mechanics has facilitated the age of nanotechnology.

Hertz also described the "Hertzian cone", a type of fracture mode in brittle solids caused by the transmission of stress waves.

=== Meteorology ===
Hertz always had a deep interest in meteorology, probably derived from his contacts with Wilhelm von Bezold (who was his professor in a laboratory course at the Munich Polytechnic in the summer of 1878). As an assistant to Helmholtz in Berlin, he contributed a few minor articles in the field, including research on the evaporation of liquids, a new kind of hygrometer, and a graphical means of determining the properties of moist air when subjected to adiabatic changes.

=== Philosophy of science ===
In the introduction of his 1894 book Principles of Mechanics, Hertz discusses the different "pictures" used to represent physics in his time including the picture of Newtonian mechanics (based on mass and forces), a second picture (based on conservation of energy and Hamilton's principle) and his own picture (based uniquely on space, time, mass and the Hertz principle), comparing them in terms of 'permissibility', 'correctness' and 'appropriateness'. Hertz wanted to remove "empty assumptions" and argue against the Newtonian concept of force and against action at a distance. Philosopher Ludwig Wittgenstein inspired by Hertz's work, extended his picture theory into a picture theory of language in his 1921 Tractatus Logico-Philosophicus which influenced logical positivism. Wittgenstein also quotes him in the Blue and Brown Books.

== Death ==
In 1892, Hertz was diagnosed with an infection (after a bout of severe migraines) and underwent operations to treat the illness. He died due to complications after surgery, which had attempted to cure his condition. Based on a diary and extensive correspondence with his family made available in a 1997 biography by Albrecht Fölsing, the source of his illness is likely to have been granulomatosis with polyangiitis, 45 years before the disease had yet been explored. He died on 1 January 1894 in Bonn, aged 36, and is buried in the Ohlsdorf Cemetery in Hamburg.

Hertz's wife, Elisabeth Hertz (née Doll; 1864–1941), did not remarry. He was survived by his daughters, Johanna (1887–1967) and Mathilde (1891–1975). Neither ever married or had children, hence Hertz has no living descendants.

== Third Reich treatment ==
Because Hertz's family had converted from Judaism to Lutheranism two decades before his birth, his legacy ran afoul of the Nazi government in the 1930s, a regime that classified people by "race" instead of religious affiliation.

Hertz's name was removed from streets and institutions, and there was even a movement to rename the frequency unit named in his honor (hertz) after Hermann von Helmholtz instead, keeping the symbol (Hz) unchanged.

His family was also persecuted for their non-Aryan status. Hertz's youngest daughter, Mathilde, lost a lectureship at Berlin University after the Nazis came to power, and within a few years she, her sister, and their mother left Germany and settled in England.

== Legacy and honors ==
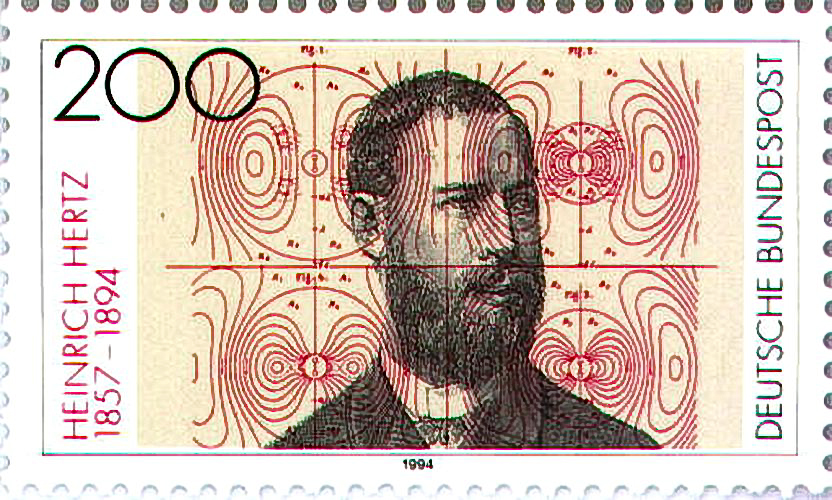
Heinrich Hertz

Heinrich Hertz's nephew, Gustav Ludwig Hertz was a Nobel Prize winner, and Gustav's son Carl Helmut Hertz invented medical ultrasonography. His daughter Mathilde Carmen Hertz was a well-known biologist and comparative psychologist. Hertz's grandnephew Hermann Gerhard Hertz, professor at the University of Karlsruhe, was a pioneer of NMR-spectroscopy and in 1995 published Hertz's laboratory notes.

The SI unit hertz (Hz) was established in his honor by the International Electrotechnical Commission in 1930 for frequency, an expression of the number of times that a repeated event occurs per second. It was adopted by the CGPM (Conférence générale des poids et mesures) in 1960, officially replacing the previous name, "cycles per second" (cps).

In 1928, the Heinrich-Hertz Institute for Oscillation Research was founded in Berlin. Today known as the Fraunhofer Institute for Telecommunications, Heinrich Hertz Institute, HHI.

The Heinrich Hertz Tower is a telecommunications tower in Hamburg, built 1965–1968.

In 1969, in East Germany, a Heinrich Hertz memorial medal was cast.

The IEEE Heinrich Hertz Medal, established in 1987, is "for outstanding achievements in Hertzian waves [...] presented annually to an individual for achievements which are theoretical or experimental in nature".

The Submillimeter Radio Telescope at Mt. Graham, Arizona, constructed in 1992, is named after him.

A crater that lies on the far side of the Moon, just behind the eastern limb, is the Hertz crater, named in his honor.

On his birthday in 2012, Google honored Hertz with a Google doodle, inspired by his life's work, on its home page.

== Works ==
=== Books ===
- Ueber die Induction in rotirenden Kugeln (in German). Berlin: Gustav Schade. 1880.
- Die Prinzipien der Mechanik in neuem Zusammenhange dargestellt (in German). Leipzig: Johann Ambrosius Barth. 1894.
- Schriften vermischten Inhalts (in German). Leipzig: Johann Ambrosius Barth. 1895.
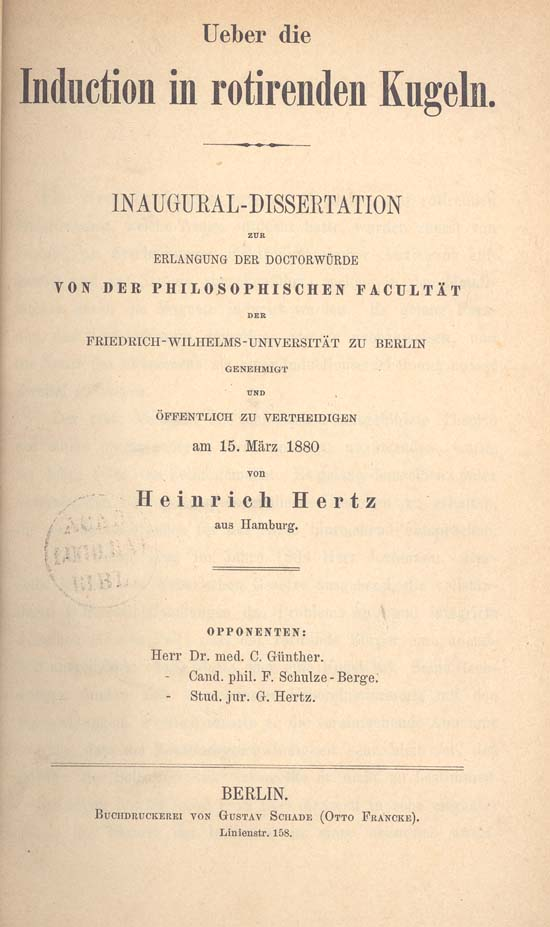
Ueber die Induction in rotirenden Kugeln, 1880

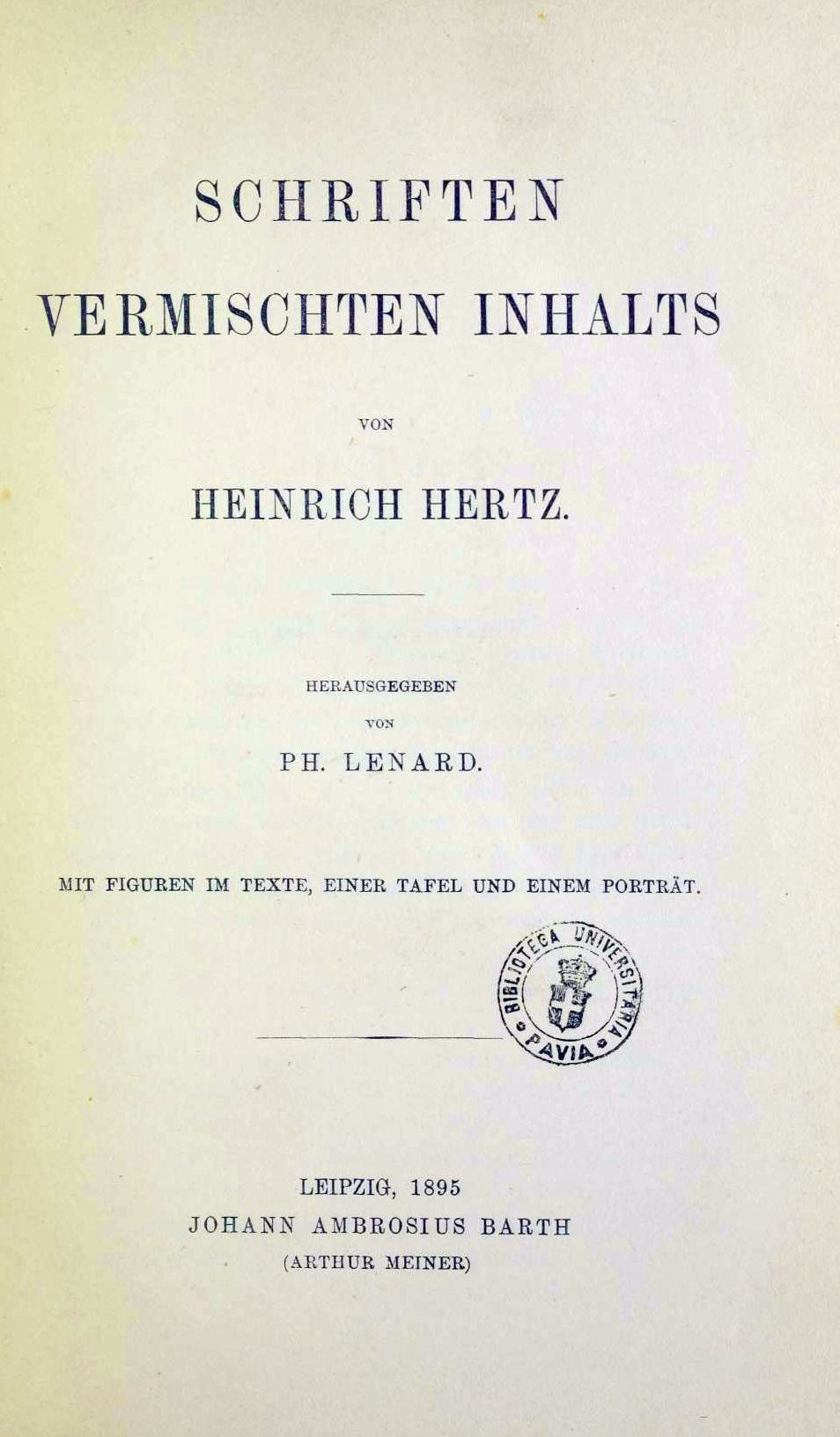
Schriften vermischten Inhalts, 1895

=== Articles ===
- Hertz, H.R. "Ueber sehr schnelle electrische Schwingungen", Annalen der Physik, vol. 267, no. 7, p. 421–448, May 1887 doi:10.1002/andp.18872670707
- Hertz, H.R. "Ueber einen Einfluss des ultravioletten Lichtes auf die electrische Entladung", Annalen der Physik, vol. 267, no. 8, p. 983–1000, June 1887 doi:10.1002/andp.18872670827
- Hertz, H.R. "Ueber die Einwirkung einer geradlinigen electrischen Schwingung auf eine benachbarte Strombahn", Annalen der Physik, vol. 270, no. 5, p. 155–170, March 1888 doi:10.1002/andp.18882700510
- Hertz, H.R. "Ueber die Ausbreitungsgeschwindigkeit der electrodynamischen Wirkungen", Annalen der Physik, vol. 270, no. 7, p. 551–569, May 1888 doi:10.1002/andp.18882700708
- Hertz, H. R.(1899) The Principles of Mechanics Presented in a New Form, London, Macmillan, with an introduction by Hermann von Helmholtz (English translation of Die Prinzipien der Mechanik in neuem Zusammenhange dargestellt, Leipzig, posthumously published in 1894).

== See also ==
Lists and histories

- Fraunhofer Institute for Telecommunications, Heinrich Hertz Institute
- History of radio
- Invention of radio
- List of physicists
- Outline of physics
- Timeline of mechanics and physics
- Electromagnetism timeline
- Wireless telegraphy

Electromagnetic radiation

- Microwave

Other

- List of German inventors and discoverers
