= Electrical injury =

Physiological reaction or injury caused by electric current

- Other names: Electrical shock
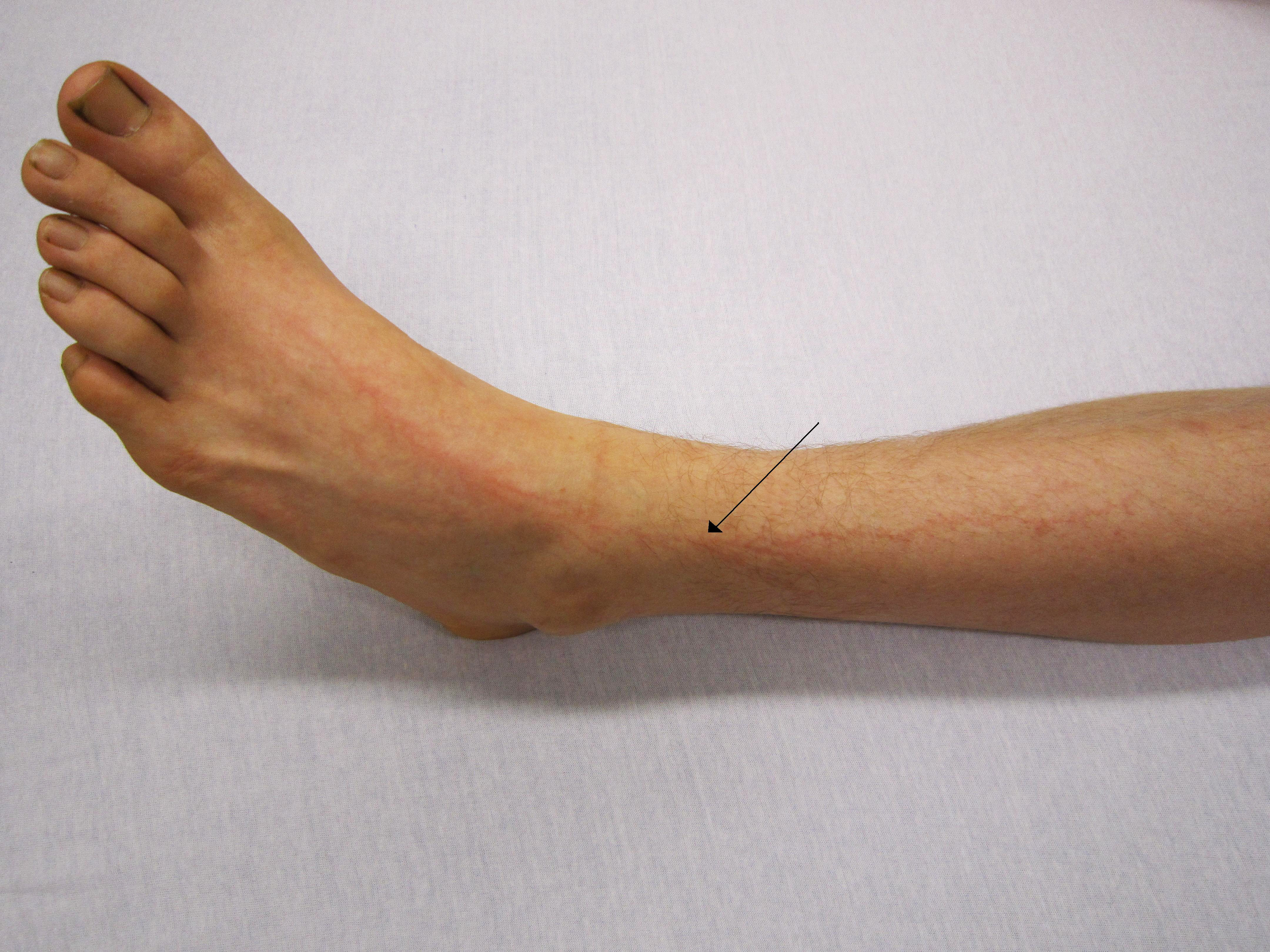
- Lightning injury caused by a nearby lightning strike. The slight branching redness (sometimes called a Lichtenberg figure) travelling up the leg was caused by the effects of current.
- Specialty: Emergency medicine
- Complications: Burns, rhabdomyolysis, cardiac arrest, bone fractures
- Frequency: >30,000 per year (USA)
- Deaths: ~1,000 per year (USA)

An electrical injury (electric injury) or electrical shock (electric shock) is damage sustained to the skin or internal organs on direct contact with an electric current.

The injury depends on the density of the current, tissue resistance and duration of contact. Very small currents may be imperceptible or only produce a light tingling sensation. However, a shock caused by low and otherwise harmless current could startle an individual and cause injury due to jerking away or falling. A strong electric shock can often cause painful muscle spasms severe enough to dislocate joints or even to break bones. The loss of muscle control is the reason that a person may be unable to release themselves from the electrical source; if this happens at a height as on a power line they can be thrown off. Larger currents can result in tissue damage and may trigger ventricular fibrillation or cardiac arrest. If death results from an electric shock the cause of death is generally referred to as electrocution.

Electric injury occurs upon contact of a body part with electricity that causes a sufficient current to pass through the person's tissues. Contact with energized wiring or devices is the most common cause. In cases of exposure to high voltages, such as on a power transmission tower, direct contact may not be necessary as the voltage may "jump" the air gap to the electrical device.

Following an electrical injury from household current, if a person has no symptoms, no underlying heart problems, and is not pregnant, further testing is not required. Otherwise an electrocardiogram, blood work to check the heart, and urine testing for signs of muscle breakdown may be performed.

Management may involve resuscitation, pain medications, wound management, and heart rhythm monitoring. Electrical injuries affect more than 30,000 people a year in the United States and result in about 1,000 deaths.

== Signs and symptoms ==
=== Burns ===
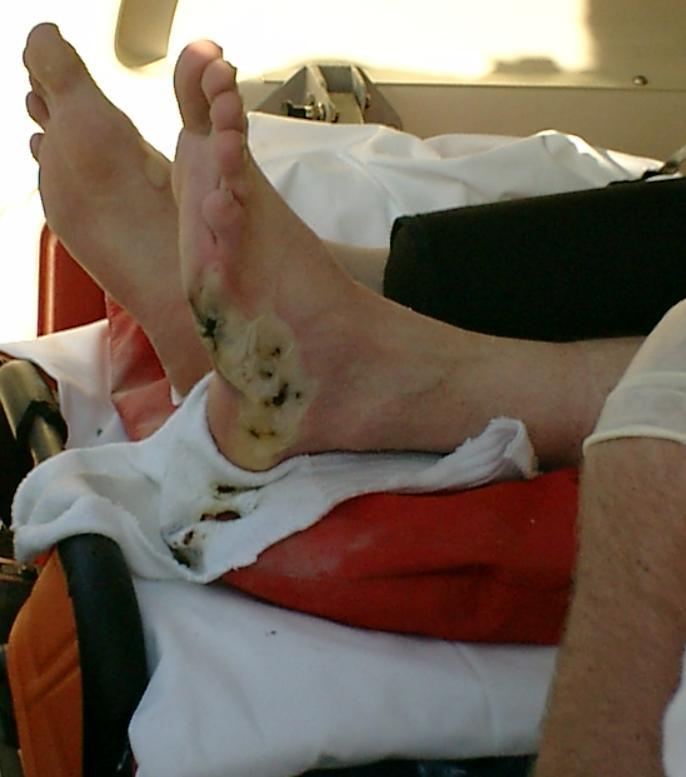
Second-degree burn after a high tension line accident

Heating due to resistance can cause extensive and deep burns. When applied to the hand, electricity can cause involuntary muscle contraction, preventing the victim from untensing their hand muscles and releasing the wire, increasing the risk for serious burns. Voltage levels of 500 to 1000 volts tend to cause internal burns due to the large energy (which is proportional to the duration multiplied by the square of the voltage divided by resistance or the square of the current multiplied by the resistance) available from the source. Damage due to current is through tissue heating and/or electroporation injury. For most cases of high-energy electrical trauma, the Joule heating in the deeper tissues along the extremity will reach damaging temperatures in a few seconds.

=== Ventricular fibrillation ===
A domestic power supply voltage (110 or 230 V), 50 or 60 Hz alternating current (AC) through the chest for a duration longer than one second may induce ventricular fibrillation at currents as low as 30 milliamperes (mA). With direct current (DC), 90 to 130 mA are required at the same duration. If the current has a direct pathway to the heart (e.g., via a cardiac catheter or other kind of electrode), a much lower current of less than 1 mA (AC or DC) can cause fibrillation. If not immediately treated by defibrillation, ventricular fibrillation is usually lethal, causing cardiac arrest, because all of the heart muscle fibres move independently instead of in the coordinated action needed for successful cardiac cycle to pump blood and maintain circulation. Short single DC pulses induce VF dependent on the amount of charge (in mC) transferred to the body, which makes the amplitude of the electrical stimulus independent of the exact amount of current flowing through the body for very short pulse durations. DC shocks of short duration are usually better tolerated by the heart even at high currents and rarely induce ventricular fibrillation compared to lower currents with longer duration with both DC or AC. The amount of current can easily reach very high values as amperage is only of second order importance to fibrillation risk in the case of ultra short contact times with direct currents. But even if the charge itself is harmless, the amount of energy being discharged still can lead to thermal and chemical hazards if its value is high enough. One example of high current electric shock which may be usually harmless is an electrostatic discharge as experienced in everyday life on door handles, car doors etc. These currents can reach values up to 60 A without harmful effects on the heart as the duration is in the order of only several ns. Another example for dangerous electrostatic discharges even without flowing directly through the body are lightning strikes and high voltage arcs.

==== Mechanism ====
Mechanism of cardiac arrhythmias induced by electricity is not fully understood, but various biopsies have shown arrhythmogenic foci in patchy myocardial fibrosis which contained increased amount of Na+ and K+ pumps, possibly associated with transient and localized changes in sodium-potassium transport as well as their concentrations, resulting in changes in membrane potential.

=== Neurological effects ===
Electric shock which does not lead to death has been shown to cause neuropathy in some cases at the site where the current entered the body. The neurologic symptoms of electrical injury may occur immediately, which traditionally have a higher likelihood for healing, though they may also be delayed by days to years. The delayed neurologic consequences of electrical injury have a worse prognosis.

When the path of electric current proceeds through the head, it appears that, with sufficient current applied, loss of consciousness almost always occurs swiftly. This is borne out by research from the field of animal husbandry, where electric stunning has been extensively studied.

If ventricular fibrillation occurs (as above), the blood supply to the brain is diminished, which may cause cerebral hypoxia (and its associated neurologic consequences).

=== Mental health ===
There are a variety of psychiatric effects that may occur as a result of electrical injuries. Behavioral changes can occur as well, even if the path of electric current did not proceed through the head. Symptoms may include:

- Depression, including feelings of low self-esteem and guilt
- Anxiety spectrum disorders, including posttraumatic stress disorder and fear of electricity
- Moodiness, including a lower threshold for frustration and "losing one's temper"
- Memory loss, decreased attention span, and difficulty learning

=== Arc-flash hazards ===
OSHA found that up to 80 percent of its electrical injuries involve thermal burns due to arcing faults. The arc flash in an electrical fault produces the same type of light radiation from which electric welders protect themselves using face shields with dark glass, heavy leather gloves, and full-coverage clothing. The heat produced may cause severe burns, especially on unprotected flesh. The arc blast produced by vaporizing metallic components can break bones and damage internal organs. The degree of hazard present at a particular location can be determined by a detailed analysis of the electrical system, and appropriate protection worn if the electrical work must be performed with the electricity on.

== Pathophysiology ==
The minimum current a human can feel depends on the current type (AC or DC) as well as frequency for AC. A person can sense electric current as low as 1 mA (rms) for 60 Hz AC and as low as 5 mA for DC. At around 10 mA, AC current passing through the arm of a 68-kilogram (150 lb) human can cause powerful muscle contractions; the victim is unable to voluntarily control muscles and cannot release an electrified object. This is known as the "let go threshold" and is a criterion for shock hazard in electrical regulations.

The current may, if it is high enough, cause tissue damage or fibrillation which can cause cardiac arrest; more than 30 mA of AC (rms, 60 Hz) or 300–500 mA of DC at high voltage can cause fibrillation. A sustained electric shock from AC at 120 V, 60 Hz is an especially dangerous source of ventricular fibrillation because it usually exceeds the let-go threshold, while not delivering enough initial energy to propel the person away from the source. However, the potential seriousness of the shock depends on paths through the body that the currents take. If the voltage is less than 200 V, then the human skin, more precisely the stratum corneum, is the main contributor to the impedance of the body in the case of a macroshock—the passing of current between two contact points on the skin. The characteristics of the skin are non-linear however. If the voltage is above 450–600 V, then dielectric breakdown of the skin occurs. The protection offered by the skin is lowered by perspiration, and this is accelerated if electricity causes muscles to contract above the let-go threshold for a sustained period of time.

If an electrical circuit is established by electrodes introduced in the body, bypassing the skin, then the potential for lethality is much higher if a circuit through the heart is established. This is known as a microshock. Currents of only 10 μA can be sufficient to cause fibrillation in this case with a probability of 0.2%.

=== Body resistance ===
Voltage	5%	50%	95%
25 V	1,750 Ω	3,250 Ω	6,100 Ω
100 V	1,200 Ω	1,875 Ω	3,200 Ω
220 V	1,000 Ω	1,350 Ω	2,125 Ω
1000 V	700 Ω	1,050 Ω	1,500 Ω

The voltage necessary for electrocution depends on the current through the body and the duration of the current. Ohm's law states that the current drawn depends on the resistance of the body. The resistance of human skin varies from person to person and fluctuates between different times of day. The NIOSH states "Under dry conditions, the resistance offered by the human body may be as high as 100,000 ohms. Wet or broken skin may drop the body's resistance to 1,000 ohms," adding that "high-voltage electrical energy quickly breaks down human skin, reducing the human body's resistance to 500 ohms".

The International Electrotechnical Commission gives the following values for the total body impedance of a hand to hand circuit for dry skin, large contact areas, 50 Hz AC currents (the columns contain the distribution of the impedance in the population percentile; for example at 100 V 50% of the population had an impedance of 1875Ω or less):

=== Skin ===
The voltage-current characteristic of human skin is non-linear and depends on many factors such as intensity, duration, history, and frequency of the electrical stimulus. Sweat gland activity, temperature, and individual variation also influence the voltage-current characteristic of skin. In addition to non-linearity, skin impedance exhibits asymmetric and time varying properties. These properties can be modeled with reasonable accuracy. Resistance measurements made at low voltage using a standard ohmmeter do not accurately represent the impedance of human skin over a significant range of conditions.

For sinusoidal electrical stimulation less than 10 volts, the skin voltage-current characteristic is quasilinear. Over time, electrical characteristics can become non-linear. The time required varies from seconds to minutes, depending on stimulus, electrode placement, and individual characteristics.

Between 10 volts and about 30 volts, skin exhibits non-linear but symmetric electrical characteristics. Above 20 volts, electrical characteristics are both non-linear and symmetric. Skin conductance can increase by several orders of magnitude in milliseconds. This should not be confused with dielectric breakdown, which occurs at hundreds of volts. For these reasons, current flow cannot be accurately calculated by simply applying Ohm's law using a fixed resistance model.

=== Point of entry ===
- Macroshock: Current across intact skin and through the body. Current from arm to arm, or between an arm and a foot, is likely to traverse the heart, therefore it is much more dangerous than current between a leg and the ground. This type of shock by definition must pass into the body through the skin.
- Microshock: Very small current source with a pathway directly connected to the heart tissue. The shock is required to be administered from inside the skin, directly to the heart i.e. a pacemaker lead, or a guide wire, conductive catheter etc. connected to a source of current. This is a largely theoretical hazard as modern devices used in these situations include protections against such currents.

=== Lethality ===
==== Electrocution ====
The earliest usage of the term "electrocution" cited by the Oxford English Dictionary was an 1889 newspaper reference to the method of execution then being considered. Shortly thereafter, in 1892, the term was used in Science to refer generically to death or injury caused by electricity.

==== Factors in lethality of electric shock ====
Log-log graph of the effect of alternating current I of duration T passing from left hand to feet as defined in IEC 60479–1. AC-1: imperceptible AC-2: perceptible but no muscle reaction AC-3: muscle contraction with reversible effects AC-4: possible irreversible effects AC-4.1: up to 5% probability of ventricular fibrillation AC-4.2: 5–50% probability of fibrillation AC-4.3: over 50% probability of fibrillation

The lethality of an electric shock is dependent on several variables:

- Current: The higher the current, the more likely it is lethal. Since current is proportional to voltage when resistance is fixed (ohm's law), high voltage is an indirect risk for producing higher currents.
- Duration: The longer the shock duration, the more likely it is lethal—safety switches may limit time of current flow. Short high-current pulses, as from capacitors, are usually less dangerous than longer-lasting low-current shocks.
- Pathway: If current flows through vital organs, like the heart muscle, it is more likely to be lethal.
- High voltage (over about 600 volts). In addition to greater current flow, high voltage may cause dielectric breakdown at the skin, thus lowering skin resistance and allowing further increased current flow.
- Medical implants: Artificial cardiac pacemakers or implantable cardioverter-defibrillators (ICD) are sensitive to very small currents.
- Pre-existing medical condition
- Age, body mass, and health status
- Sex: Women are more vulnerable to electric shock than men.

Other issues affecting lethality are frequency, which is an issue in causing cardiac arrest or muscular spasms. Very high frequency electric current causes tissue burning, but does not stimulate the nerves strongly enough to cause cardiac arrest (see electrosurgery). Also important is the pathway: if the current passes through the chest or head, there is an increased chance of death. Another factor is that cardiac tissue has a chronaxie (response time) of about 3 milliseconds, so electricity at frequencies of higher than about 333 Hz requires more current to cause fibrillation than is required at lower frequencies.

The comparison between the dangers of alternating current at typical power transmission frequencies (i.e., 50 or 60 Hz), and direct current has been a subject of debate ever since the war of the currents in the 1880s.

It is sometimes suggested that human lethality is most common with alternating current at 100–250 volts; however, death has occurred below this range, with supplies as low as 42 volts. Assuming a steady current flow (as opposed to a shock from a capacitor or from static electricity), shocks above 2,700 volts are often fatal, with those above 11,000 volts being usually fatal, though exceptional cases have been noted. According to the Guinness Book of World Records, seventeen-year-old Brian Latasa survived a 230,000 volt shock on the tower of an ultra-high voltage line in Griffith Park, Los Angeles on November 9, 1967. A news report of the event stated that he was "jolted through the air, and landed across the line", and though rescued by firemen, he sustained burns over 40% of his body and was completely paralyzed except for his eyelids. The shock with the highest voltage reported survived was that of Harry F. McGrew, who came in contact with a 340,000 volt transmission line in Huntington Canyon, Utah.

The severity and lethality of electric shocks generally depend on the duration and the amount of current passing through the human body. Frequency plays a role with AC and pulse DC. For example, a high frequency current has a higher ventricular fibrillation threshold than lower frequency. Also, shorter single pulses have higher thresholds than short pulses. Below 10 ms are usually believed to have a primarily charge dependent threshold and shock amplitude. Research shows that for very short electric pulse durations below 100 μs the threshold curve converges into a constant charge criterion independent of peak current or RMS values. Even though the for both muscle and nerve stimulation including the heart and the brain. Heating is primarily determined by the amount of energy and is not related to stimulation. These definitions have been included into the IEC standard 60479-2 in opposite to IEC 60479-1 which addresses longer pulse durations above 10 ms for both DC and AC, which use a current over time duration curve based classification. These principles are used to determine the risks from capacitors, electric weapons, electric fences and other short pulsed low- and high-voltage electrical applications outside the medical field.

== Prevention in points ==
Prevention of electrical injuries is one of the fundamental objectives of national electrical codes for permanently-installed electrical systems in buildings. Shock danger may be reduced by use of an extra-low voltage electrical system that is unlikely to expose a human to dangerous levels of current. Special isolated power systems may be used in applications such as operating theatres, where electrical equipment must be used in proximity to a person unusually vulnerable to electrical shock. For electrical equipment used outdoors or in wet areas, an Earth-leakage circuit breaker known as a residual-current device or ground fault circuit interrupter, may provide protection from electrical current leakage.

Electrical devices have non-conductive insulation preventing contact with energized wires or parts, or may have conductive metal enclosures connected to earth ground so that users will not be exposed to dangerous voltage. Double insulated devices have a separate insulation system, distinct from the insulation required for the function of the device, and intended for protection of the user from electrical shock.

People and animals can be protected by installing electrical equipment out of reach of passers-by, such as on electrical transmission towers, or by installation in an electrical room only accessible to authorized persons. Stray current leakage or electrical fault current may be diverted by bonding all conductive equipment enclosures together and to the earth. Current passing through the earth may also provide a hazard of electrical shock, so a ground grid may be installed around installations such as electrical substations. Lightning protection systems are primarily installed to reduce property damage by lightning strikes, but may not entirely prevent electrical shock hazards. Persons outdoors during a lightning storm may be advised to take precautions to avoid electrical shock.

Where installation, or maintenance of electrical equipment is required, interlock devices may be used to ensure that all electrical sources are removed from the equipment before accessing normally energized parts. Administrative procedures such as lockout–tagout are used to protect workers from accidentally re-energizing equipment under repair. Where accidental contact with energized components is still possible, or where adjustment of an energized system is absolutely necessary, workers may be trained to use insulated or non-conductive tools, and personal protective equipment such as gloves, face shields, non-conductive boots, or cover-up mats. With proper training and equipment, live-line maintenance is routinely safely carried out on electrical transmission lines energized at hundreds of thousands of volts.

== Epidemiology ==
There were 550 reported electrocution deaths in the US in 1993, 2.1 deaths per million inhabitants. At that time, the incidence of electrocutions was decreasing. Electrocutions in the workplace make up the majority of these fatalities. From 1980–1992, an average of 411 workers were killed each year by electrocution. Workplace deaths caused by exposure to electricity in the U.S. increased by nearly 24% between 2015 and 2019, from 134 to 166. However, workplace electrical injuries dropped 23% between 2015 and 2019 from 2,480 to 1,900. In 2019, the top 5 states with the most workplace electrical fatalities were: (1) Texas (608); (2) California (451); (3) Florida (306); (4) New York (273); and (5) Georgia (207).

A recent study conducted by the National Coroners Information System (NCIS) in Australia has revealed 321 closed case fatalities (and at least 39 case fatalities still under coronial investigation) that had been reported to Australian coroners where a person died from electrocution between July 2000 and October 2011.

In Sweden, Denmark, Finland and Norway the number of electric deaths per million inhabitants was 0.6, 0.3, 0.3 and 0.2, respectively, in the years 2007–2011.

In Nigeria, analysis of Nigerian Electricity Regulatory Commission data found 126 recorded electrocution deaths and 68 serious injuries in 2020 and the first half of 2021.

People who survive electrical trauma may develop a host of injuries including loss of consciousness, seizures, aphasia, visual disturbances, headaches, tinnitus, paresis, and memory disturbances. Even without visible burns, electric shock survivors may be faced with long-term muscular pain and discomfort, exhaustion, headache, problems with peripheral nerve conduction and sensation, inadequate balance and coordination, among other symptoms. Electrical injury can lead to problems with neurocognitive function, affecting speed of mental processing, attention, concentration, and memory. The high frequency of psychological problems is well established and may be multifactorial. As with any traumatic and life-threatening experience, electrical injury may result in post traumatic psychiatric disorders. There exist several non-profit research institutes that coordinate rehabilitation strategies for electrical injury survivors by connecting them with clinicians that specialize in diagnosis and treatment of various traumas that arise as a result of electrical injury.. Survivors with persistent neurological, neuropsychological, or functional impairments may require coordinated, multidisciplinary evaluation and rehabilitation strategies, which are sometimes facilitated through specialized research and rehabilitation programs focused on electrical injury. Specialized rehabilitation programs for electrical injury survivors have been discussed in occupational safety literature.

== Deliberate uses ==
=== Medical uses ===
Electric shock is also used as a medical therapy, under carefully controlled conditions:

- Electroconvulsive therapy or ECT, a psychiatric therapy for mental disorders
- As a surgical tool for cutting or coagulation in electrosurgery. An electrosurgical unit (ESU) uses high currents (e.g. 10 amperes) at high frequency (e.g. 500 kHz) with various schemes of amplitude modulation to cut or coagulate
- As a treatment for fibrillation or irregular heart rhythms: see Defibrillation and Cardioversion
- As a method of pain relief: see Transcutaneous electrical nerve stimulation (TENS)
- As a treatment for excessive sweating with a process called iontophoresis
- Electrodiagnosis, for example nerve conduction studies and electromyography
- Electroporation for gene delivery

=== Entertainment ===
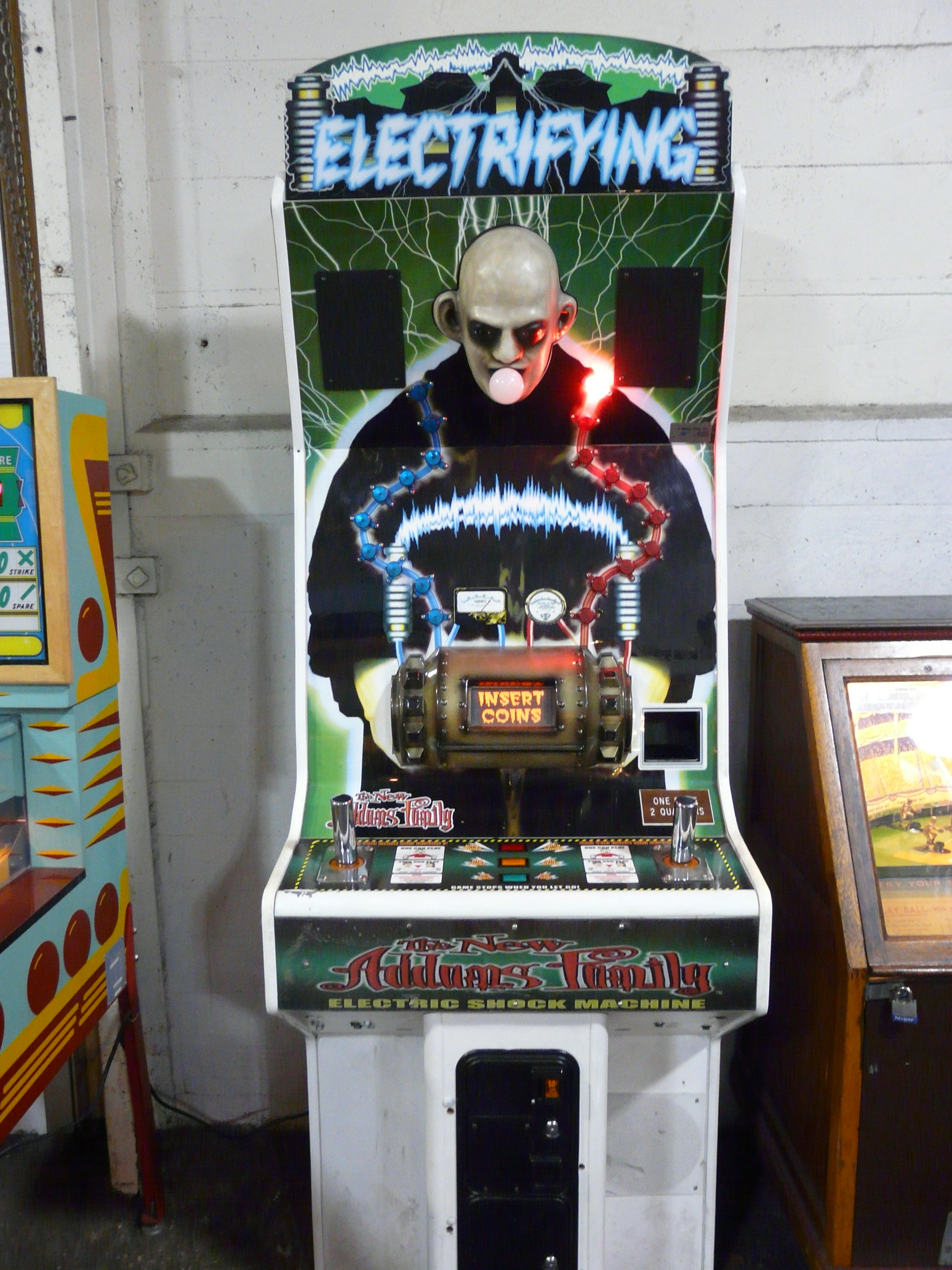
Electrifying machine at Musée Mécanique that actually works with vibration

Mild electric shocks are also used for entertainment, especially as a practical joke for example in such devices as a shocking pen or a shocking gum. However devices such as a joy buzzer and most other machines in amusement parks today only use vibration that feels somewhat like an electric shock to someone not expecting it.

=== Policing and personal defense ===
Electroshock weapons are incapacitant weapons used for subduing a person by administering electric shock to disrupt superficial muscle functions. One type is a conductive energy device (CED), an electroshock gun popularly known by the brand name "Taser", which fires projectiles that administer the shock through a thin, flexible wire. Although they are illegal for personal use in many jurisdictions, Tasers have been marketed to the general public. Other electroshock weapons such as stun guns, stun batons ("cattle prods"), and electroshock belts administer an electric shock by direct contact.

Electric fences are barriers that use electric shocks to deter animals or people from crossing a boundary. The voltage of the shock may have effects ranging from uncomfortable, to painful or even lethal. Most electric fencing is used today for agricultural fencing and other forms of animal control purposes, though it is frequently used to enhance security of restricted areas, and there exist places where lethal voltages are used.

=== Torture ===
Several deliberate uses of electric shock are considered torture.

The Tucker Telephone is a torture device that was used in the Tucker State Prison Farm, Arkansas, whereby the received voltage and current could be controlled with precision, thus causing pain and fear while avoiding visible damage to the victim's body.

Electrical torture has been used in war and by repressive regimes since the 1930s. During the Algerian War electrical torture was used by French military forces. Amnesty International published a statement that Russian military forces in Chechnya tortured local women with electric shocks by attaching wires onto their breasts.

The use of electric shocks to torture political prisoners of the Brazilian military dictatorship (1964 - 1985) is detailed in the final report of the National Truth Commission, published December 10, 2014.

The parrilla (Spanish for 'grill') is a method of torture whereby the victim is strapped to a metal frame and subjected to electric shock. It has been used in a number of contexts in South America. The parrilla was commonly used at Villa Grimaldi, a prison complex maintained by Dirección de Inteligencia Nacional, a part of the Pinochet regime. In the 1970s, during the Dirty War, the parrilla was used in Argentina. Francisco Tenório Júnior (known as Tenorinho), a Brazilian piano player, was subjected to the parrilla during the military dictatorship in Brazil.

The Islamic State has used electric shocks to torture and kill captives.

Advocates for the mentally ill and some psychiatrists such as Thomas Szasz have asserted that electroconvulsive therapy (ECT) is torture when used without a bona fide medical benefit against recalcitrant or non-responsive patients.

The Judge Rotenberg Center in Canton, Massachusetts, has been condemned for torture by the United Nations special rapporteur on torture for its use of electric shocks with the purpose of punishment as part of its behavior modification program.

Japanese serial killer Futoshi Matsunaga used electric shocks to control his victims.

=== Capital punishment ===
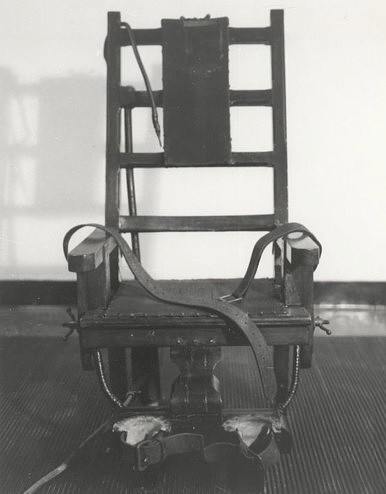
Electric chair in Sing Sing

Electric shock delivered by an electric chair is sometimes used as an official means of capital punishment in the United States, although its use has become rare from the 1990s onward due to the adoption of lethal injection. Although some original proponents of the electric chair considered it to be a more humane execution method than hanging, shooting, poison gassing, etc., it has now generally been replaced by lethal injections in states that practice capital punishment. Modern reporting has claimed that it sometimes takes several shocks to be lethal, and that the condemned person may actually catch fire before death.

Other than in parts of the United States, only the Philippines reportedly has used this method, from 1926 to 1976. It was intermittently replaced by the firing squad, until the death penalty was abolished in that country. Electrocution remains legal in 9 states (primary method in South Carolina, optional in Alabama and Florida, optional if sentenced before a certain date in Arkansas, Kentucky and Tennessee, can only be used if other methods are found to be unconstitutional in Louisiana, Mississippi and Oklahoma) of the United States.

== See also ==
- Electrical burn
- Electromagnetism
- Graduated electronic decelerator
- Lichtenberg figure
- Lightning injury
- Milgram experiment
