= Computational Materials Science (journal) =

- Discipline: Materials science
- Language: English
- Edited by: S. Sinnott

Publication details
- History: 1992-present
- Publisher: Elsevier
- Frequency: Monthly
- Impact factor: 3.1 (2023)

Standard abbreviations
- ISO 4: Comput. Mater. Sci.

Indexing
- CODEN: CMMSEM
- ISSN: 0927-0256
- LCCN: 93043334
- OCLC no.: 38840671

Links
- Journal homepage; Online access

Computational Materials Science is a monthly peer-reviewed scientific journal published by Elsevier. It was established in October 1992. The editor-in-chief is Susan Sinnott. The journal covers computational modeling and practical research for advanced materials and their applications.

== Abstracting and indexing ==
The journal is abstracted and indexed by:

- Aluminium Industry Abstracts
- Chemical Abstracts Service - CASSI
- Current Contents/Physical, Chemical & Earth Sciences
- EI-Compendex
- Inspec
- Materials Science Citation Index
- Metals Abstracts
- Research Alert
- Science Citation Index
- Scopus

According to the Journal Citation Reports, the journal has a 2020 impact factor of 3.3.
