= Leonard Sander =

American physicist

- Born: United States
- Education: University of California, Berkeley; Washington University in St. Louis
- Scientific career
- Institutions: University of Michigan

Leonard Sander is a professor emeritus at the University of Michigan and a fellow of the American Physical Society. His research includes physics, biophysics, condensed matter physics, computational neuroscience, and theoretical complex systems.

== Early life and education ==
Sander earned his B.A. in physics from Washington University in St. Louis in 1963 and his Ph.D. in physics from the University of California, Berkeley in 1968.He later joined the University of Michigan faculty in 1969.

== Career ==
Sander started work at the University of Michigan in 1969.

His research includes growth processes, statistical physics far from equilibrium, theoretical biophysics, and numerical computation. He has co-authored over 240 published papers. Along with Thomas Witten, he proposed the theory of diffusion-limited aggregation.

His paper with Witten in Physical Review Letters in 1981 has been cited over 4,000 times.

Sander's latest work involves the harmonic measure of fractals, cell motility and malignant brain tumors, statistical fluctuations and front propagation, and new methods for computation of rare events.

Sander has authored two college textbooks, Equilibrium Statistical Physics and Advanced Condensed Matter Physics.

His work has also been included in other textbooks, including Statistical Physics by L.P. Kadanoff.

== Select publications ==
- T A Witten Jr. and L. M. Sander. Phys. Rev. Lett. 47, 1400 (1981), Diffusion-Limited Aggregation, a Kinetic Cricital Phenomenon
- C. R. Doering, K. V. Sargysan and L. M. Sander, Extinction times for birth-death processes: exact results, continuum asymptotics, and the failure of the Fokker-Planck approximation, Multiscale Modeling and Simulation 3 (2), 283-299 (2005)
- A. M. Stein, D. A. Vader, L. M. Jawerth, D. A. Weitz and L. M. Sander, An algorithm for extracting the network geometry of three-dimensional collagen gels, Journal of Microscopy-Oxford 232 (3), 463-475 (2008)
- Fractal Dimensions of the Q-state Potts Model for Complete and External Hulls (David A. Adams, L. M. Sander, R. M. Ziff) Journal of Statistical Mechanics, Theory and Experiment, 2010
- The Role of Cell Contraction and Adhesion in Dictyostelium Motility (Leonard M. Sander, Mathias Buenemann, Herbert Levine, Wouter-Jan Rappel) Biophysical Journal vol. 99, no. 1, 2010
- The Micromechanics of Three-dimensional Collagen-I gels (Andrew M Stein, David A. Vader, David A. Weitz, Leonard M. Sander) Complexity vol. 16, no. 22, 2011.
- Kim, J , Feng, JC,; Jones, CAR, Mao, XM, Sander, LM, Levine, H, Sun, B, Stress-induced plasticity of dynamic collagen networks, Nature Communications 8, 842 (2017)
