= Fractal canopy =

Fractal shape formed from a line segment

Angle=2π/11, ratio=0.75

Asymmetric fractal canopy resulting from using different angles for left and right branches

A more realistic tree resulting from a higher branching factor and curved segments

In geometry, a fractal canopy, a type of fractal tree, is one of the easiest-to-create types of fractals. Each canopy is created by splitting a line segment into two smaller segments at the end (symmetric binary tree), and then splitting the two smaller segments as well, and so on, infinitely. Canopies are distinguished by the angle between concurrent adjacent segments and ratio between lengths of successive segments.

A fractal canopy must have the following three properties:

1. The angle between any two neighboring line segments is the same throughout the fractal.
2. The ratio of lengths of any two consecutive line segments is constant.
3. Points all the way at the end of the smallest line segments are interconnected, which is to say the entire figure is a connected graph.

The pulmonary system used by humans to breathe resembles a fractal canopy, as do trees, blood vessels, viscous fingering, electrical breakdown, and crystals with appropriately adjusted growth velocity from seed.

== H tree ==
Main article: H tree

The H tree is a fractal tree structure constructed from perpendicular line segments, each smaller by a factor of the square root of 2 from the next larger adjacent segment. It is so called because its repeating pattern resembles the letter "H".

It has Hausdorff dimension 2, and comes arbitrarily close to every point in a rectangle. Its applications include VLSI design and microwave engineering.

H tree: angle=π, ratio=√2; Hausdorff dimension: 2

== See also ==
- Brownian tree
- Dendrite (crystal)
- Lichtenberg figure
- H tree
