= Lightning injury =

Injury caused by lightning strike

- Other names: Effects of lightning
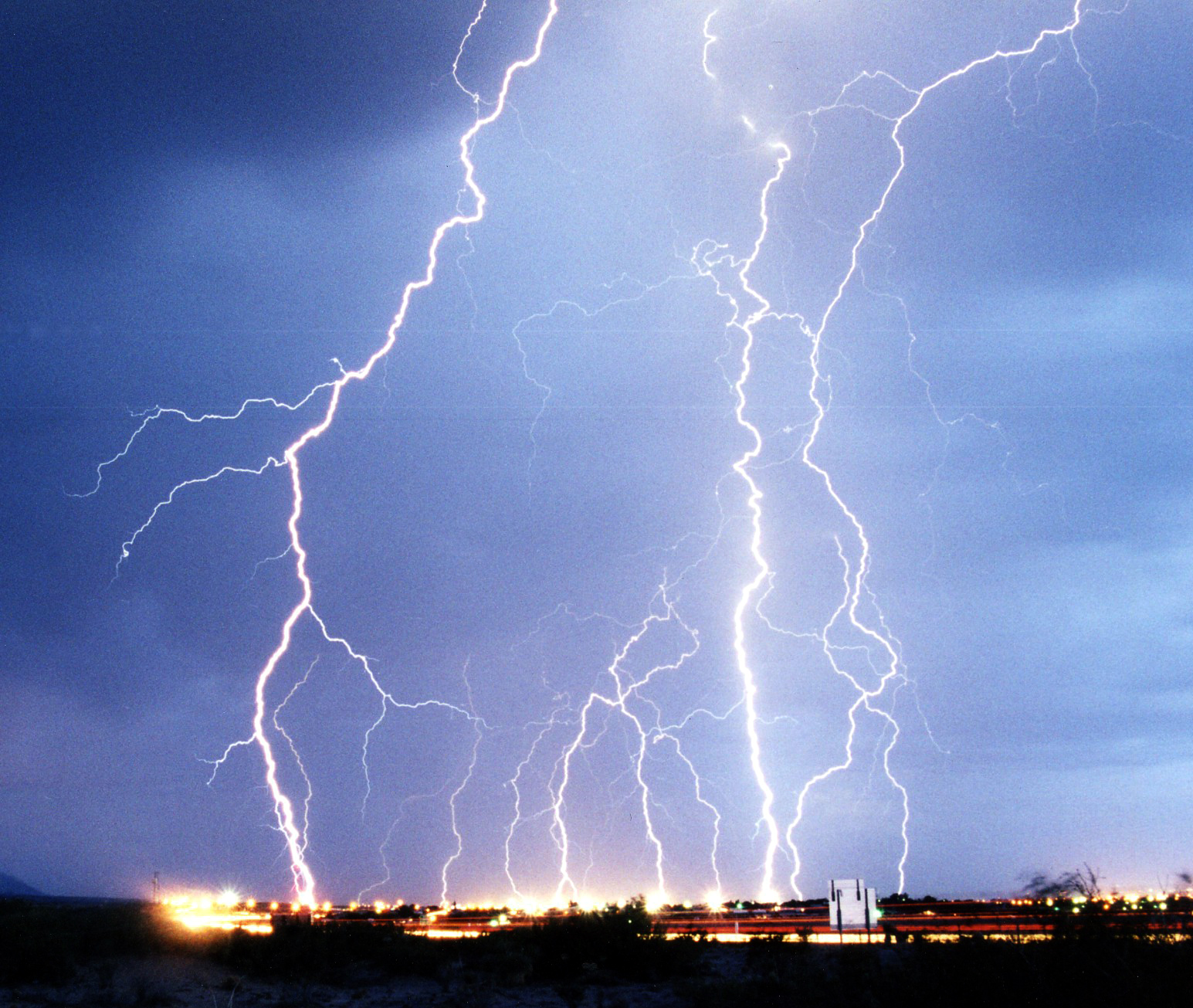
- Multiple lightning bolts strike a populated area.
- Specialty: Emergency medicine
- Types: Direct strikes, side splash, contact injury, ground current
- Causes: Lightning strike
- Diagnostic method: Based on history of the injury and examination
- Prevention: Avoiding the outdoors during a thunderstorm; sheltering in a fully-enclosed structure; if still outdoors, assuming 'lightning position' before a strike
- Treatment: CPR, artificial ventilation
- Frequency: 240,000 a year
- Deaths: 24,000 a year

Lightning injuries occur when someone is struck by lightning. Initial symptoms may include heart asystole and respiratory arrest. While the asystole may spontaneously resolve fairly rapidly, the respiratory arrest is typically more prolonged. Other symptoms may include burns and blunt injuries. Of those who survive, about 75% have ongoing health problems as a result, such as cataracts and hearing loss. If death occurs, it is typically from either an abnormal heart rhythm or respiratory failure.

Lightning injuries are divided into direct strikes, side splash, contact injury, and ground current. Ground current occurs when the lightning strikes nearby and travels to the person through the ground. Side splash makes up about a third of cases and occurs when lightning strikes nearby and jumps through the air to the person. Contact injury occurs when the person is touching the object that is hit. Direct strikes make up about 5% of injuries. The mechanism of the injuries may include electrical injury, burns from heat, and mechanical trauma. Diagnosis is typically based on history of the injury and examination.

Prevention includes avoiding being outdoors during a thunderstorm, and sheltering in a fully enclosed structure (such a closed building or metal car). If being outdoors is unavoidable, bringing the feet and knees together is recommended (if possible, while crouching low in the 'lightning position'— crouched low, hands over ears, feet touching if possible) so as to provide only one point of contact with the ground. When indoors the use of devices connected to electrical outlets and contact with water is not recommended. Among those who appear in cardiac arrest and have no central pulse, cardiopulmonary resuscitation (CPR) should be started. In those who have a central pulse but are not breathing artificial ventilation, such as mouth to mouth, is recommended.

As of 2019, it has been estimated that lightning injuries worldwide occur 240,000 times a year with 24,000 deaths. Areas with mountainous terrain and moisture-heavy airflow, such as Central Africa, have the highest rates of lightning strikes. Among pregnant women who are hit by lightning, the death of the fetus occurs in about half. In the United States, about 1 in 10,000 people are hit by lightning during their lifetime. Males are affected four times more often than females. The age group most commonly affected is 20 to 45 years old.

== Signs and symptoms ==
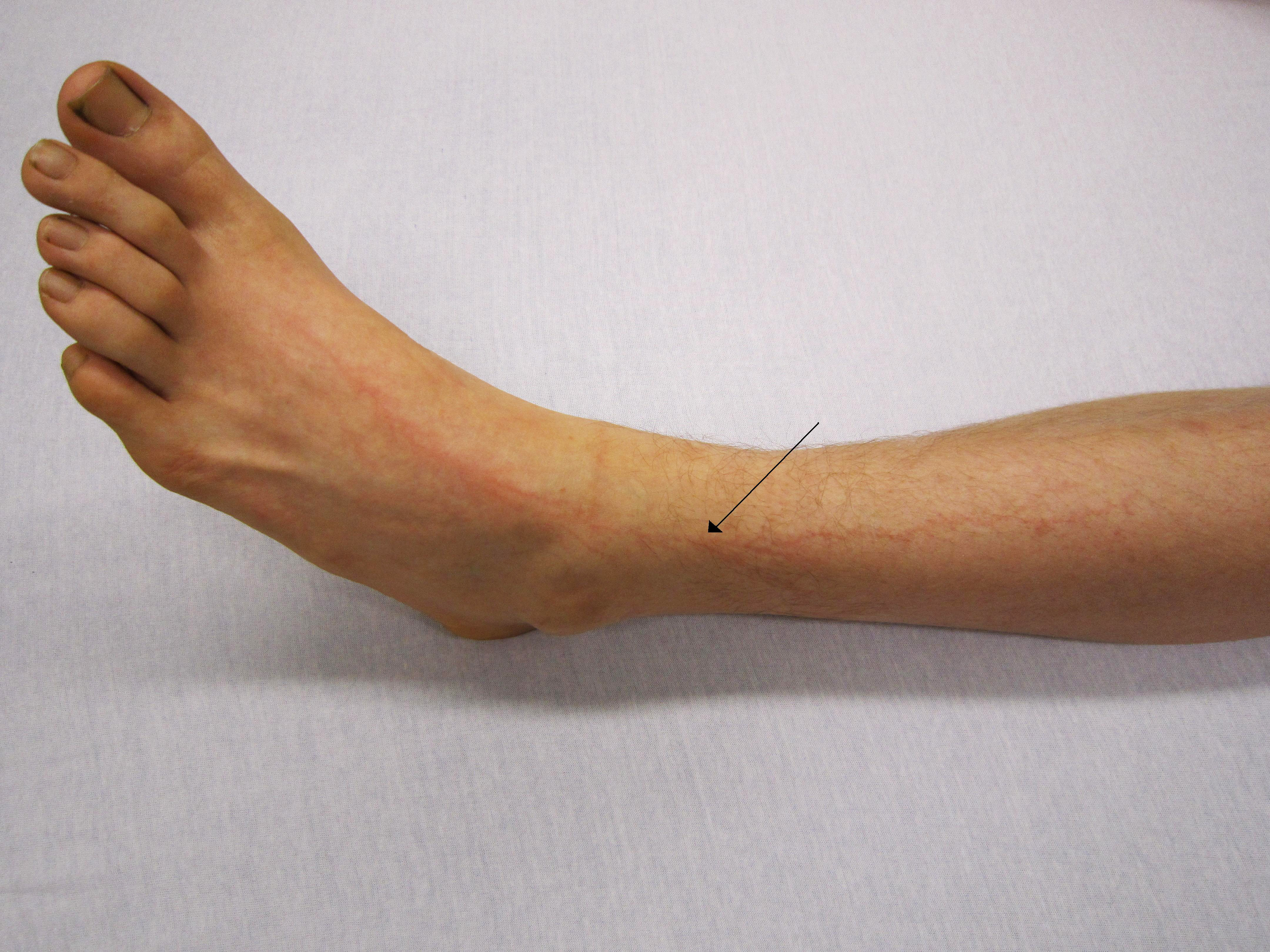
A person who was affected by a nearby lightning strike. Note the slight branching redness traveling up the victim's leg from the effects of the current.

Common injuries caused by lightning include: muscle pains, broken bones, cardiac arrest, confusion, hearing loss, seizures, burns, behavioral changes, and ocular cataracts. Loss of consciousness is very common immediately after a strike.

Lightning burns result from energy caused by lightning strikes, and are characterized by a unique pattern of skin lesions. These tree-like lesions resemble feathering or ferning, and are also called Lichtenberg figures. The marks are formed when capillaries beneath the skin rupture due to the electrical discharge and they usually appear "within hours" of the strike though they tend to disappear within a few days. They also generally occur on the upper body. The brief duration of the exposure frequently limits the damage to the outer layer of skin.

The intense heat generated by a lightning strike can burn tissue, and cause lung damage, and the chest can be damaged by the mechanical force of rapidly expanding heated air.

Just as heat can cause expanding air in the lungs, the explosive shock wave created by lightning (the cause of thunder) can cause concussive and hearing damage at extremely close range. Other physical injury can be caused by objects damaged or thrown by the lightning strike. For example, lightning striking a nearby tree may vaporize sap, and the steam explosion often causes bark and wood fragments to be explosively ejected.

Lightning strikes can also induce a transient paralysis known as keraunoparalysis. Signs and symptoms of keraunoparalysis include lack of pulse, pallor or cyanosis, and motor and sensory loss in the extremities. However, keraunoparalysis usually resolves within a few hours.

== Pathophysiology ==
Although the current flow of a lightning strike occurs only over a short period, the current has an extremely high voltage of some 30 million volts. Lightning is neither a DC or an AC current but best described as a unidirectional massive current impulse of electrons.

Lightning strikes are grouped into four categories: direct strikes, side splash, contact injury, and ground current.

- Direct strike: lightning directly hits the person
  - Orifice entry: may occur if lightning strike occurs near the head entering eyes, ears and mouth to flow internally
- Side splash: lightning jumps from the location of primary strike to a nearby person
- Contact injury: injury that occurs when a person is touching an object on the pathway of lightning
- Ground current: lightning strikes nearby and the current travels through the ground to the person

Lightning injury may occur by these electrical mechanisms or by secondary blunt trauma as a result of the strike.

== Diagnosis ==
Diagnosis is typically based on history of the injury and examination.

== Prevention ==
Preventing lightning injury involves avoiding being outdoors during a thunderstorm. While no place is entirely safe from lightning strikes, it is recommended to seek shelter in a substantial, fully-enclosed building (preferably with electrical attachments and plumbing) or a closed metal vehicle, such as a car. If being outdoors is unavoidable, staying away from metal objects (including fencing and power lines), sheets of water (ponds, lakes, etc.), tall structures, and open, exposed areas (including high ground, hills, etc.) is strongly recommended. It is dangerous to shelter under isolated trees, cliffs or other rocks. Lying on the ground is also dangerous. When a lightning strike seems imminent, a 'lightning position' can be taken by "sitting or crouching with knees and feet close together to create only one point of contact with the ground" (with the feet off the ground if sitting; if standing is necessary, the feet have to be touching). Signs of an impending strike nearby can include a crackling sound, sensations of static electricity in the hair or skin, the standing of hair on end, the pungent smell of ozone, or the appearance of a blue haze around persons or objects (St. Elmo's fire). For large groups of people, it is recommended that individuals spread out to avoid mass casualties. When indoors, the use of devices connected to electrical outlets and contact with water is discouraged.

In the United States, recreational fishing poses the greatest risk of death from lightning of any activity, accounting for 10 percent of all lightning deaths between 2006 and 2019.

Organized groups and individuals are encouraged to prepare lightning safety plans in advance. Specific tips are available for various situations, such as outdoor recreation, boating and other water activities, and organized sporting events.

== Treatment ==
=== Immediate ===
The most critical injuries are cardiac arrest and respiratory failure. This will often require prompt emergency care. It is safe to provide care immediately, as the affected person will not retain an electrical charge after the lightning has struck, contrary to popular belief.

Many people who are unconscious and appear lifeless die of suffocation. Chances of survival may be increased if cardiopulmonary resuscitation (CPR) is started immediately, and continued without interruption until return of spontaneous circulation (ROSC).

=== Long-term ===
A complete physical examination by paramedics or physicians may reveal ruptured eardrums. Ocular cataracts may later develop, sometimes more than a year after an otherwise uneventful recovery. Long-term injuries are usually neurological in nature, including memory deficit, mood disturbance, and fatigue.

== Prognosis ==
Approximately 10% of lightning strikes are lethal. Survivors of lightning strike may suffer long-term injury or disability.

== Epidemiology ==
Worldwide, it is estimated that lightning injuries occur 240,000 times a year with 24,000 deaths. Among pregnant women who are hit by lightning, the death of the fetus occurs in about half. In the United States about 1 in 10,000 people are hit by lightning during their lifetime. Males are affected four times more often than females. The age group most commonly affected is 20 to 45 years old.
