= Microshock =

Microshock refers to the risk that patients undergoing medical procedures involving externally protruding intracardiac electrical conductors, such as external pacemaker electrodes, or saline filled catheters, could suffer an electric shock causing ventricular fibrillation (VF) due to currents entering the body via these parts.

== Some definitions related to micro-shock ==
Microshock (or micro-shock) are not International Electrotechnical Vocabulary (IEV) defined terms and are not used in any international standard.

"Micro-shock" is an otherwise imperceptible electric current applied directly, or in very close proximity, to the heart muscle of sufficient strength, frequency, and duration to cause disruption of normal cardiac function.

Note: It can be safely assumed (and it usually is) that micro-shock is only possible during certain medical procedures as the electric current needs to be focused directly into the heart by some conductor inserted by invasive means for some desired medical outcome (for example Cardiac Catheterisation).

Micro-shock, if it occurs, is not always lethal. “Micro-electrocution” is the term that should be used whenever a micro-shock causes death.

“Macro-shock” is when a much larger current is passed through the body, usually via a skin to skin pathway, but more generally the current is not applied directly through the heart muscle. The current in macro-shock events can vary widely from being imperceptible to being extremely destructive of tissue. (see Macroshock)

“Electric Shock” is usually referring to macro-shock. (see Electric Shock)

“Electrocution” is usually referring to a macro-shock that has caused prolonged or severe disruption of normal cardiac function - ultimately leading to death. (see Electrocution)

== Theory ==
Microshock requires direct electrical connection to the heart muscle and is normally illustrated using a diagram such as Figure 1 (from TGE).

(an image is to be uploaded here shortly)

In this scenario the patient has inadvertently contacted both a source of current (it does not have to be AC, as shown) as well as a common return pathway during an invasive cardiac medical procedure. If the current flowing is below the threshold of perception, or the patient is sedated, or anaesthetized, there may be no pain or reflex response of either arm. If the current flow continues for sufficient time, at sufficient strength, the patient may die. Because of the low current and lack of patient response, this death may be unexpected, and without any obvious cause. In practice, however, this has never been proven to have happened.

To a novice, however, this scenario looks incredibly dangerous, and it is therefore worth examining in some detail.

Firstly, let's follow the path of the electric current. There is a generic source of current. This source can be either large or small, as only a small voltage is required to drive the low current for micro-shock. Such sources might be, a wall socket, a faulty item of equipment, an inappropriate item of equipment, a poorly designed item of equipment, or an item of equipment designed to deliver current into the body. Our patient has unfortunately been contacted to one such electrical source and current is dispersing through their right arm and upper torso, to eventually converge on a catheter (as labelled – but it could be a lead or wire) that is placed into their heart. This concentration of current flow at the heart muscle is the danger from micro-shock. If the catheter is conductive (from end to end) insulated in its passage through the body, the current may follow the catheter, emerging through the skin into some other energized item of equipment. For the circuit as shown to be complete, the loop needs to also be connected to the same ground/low-potential as the equipment. Finally, the hazardous circuit is complete – current can flow and if it continues the patient is in mortal danger. Again, while this is theoretically possible this has never been proven to have actually happened. Proving this type of event after the fact is difficult in autopsy, as the cause of the fatal ventricular fibrillation would be unknown and the death appears to be idiopathic.

So, why has this situation not arisen? Generally, electrically conductive connections made in or around a patient's heart will be those of medical-grade electrical equipment. In countries that have a regulatory environment (example: such as much of Europe and North America) micro-shock is contemplated and the surgical equipment is regulated to prevent micro-shock. These medical-grade products are generally constructed to strict standards that limit the allowable currents flowing via such connections (applied parts). This decreases the risk to the patient and increases the margin of safety.

== History ==
There has never been a documented case of microshock. A U.S. Senate inquiry in the early 1970s, sparked by exaggerated reports of thousands of U.S. hospital patients dying of microshock, heard expert testimony about the effect. A review of the evidence in the early 2000s found that not a single case had been reported in the 30 years since the Senate inquiry. Regular checks of the FDA's MAUDE database also show no evidence of this risk being manifest, before or since the review.

Based on studies with dogs by Prof Leslie Geddes in the middle of last century, it is theorised that a current as low as 10 μA (microampere) directly through the heart, may send a human patient directly into ventricular fibrillation. Of course, the exact outcome is dependent on the duration of the current, the exact position of contact, the frequency of current oscillation, and the timing of the shock with the heart's rhythm e.g. R on T phenomenon. It is feared that such a small current may be introduced unwittingly, and unobserved, creating a very perilous situation for the patient. To guard against this slim theoretical possibility then, modern medical devices include a range of protective measures to limit current in cardiac-connected circuits to the assumed safe levels of below 10 μA (microampere). These measures include isolated patient connections, high impedance connections and current limiting circuits. Despite the in-built protections, and lack of observed incidents, microshock continues to be a concern to many practitioners of the fields of Biomedical and Clinical Engineering.

Despite the evidence of decades of absence of reports, in any condition where electrical conductors are run into the body in proximity of the heart (i.e. cardiac catheterizations) precautions are still taken to ensure hazardous current is not introduced through these conductors and it is still regarded as a high-risk activity.

== See also ==
- Macroshock
- Electric Shock
- O'Meley P L Who's Afraid of Microshock - presentation to SMBE NSW Conference, Albury NSW, 2011
- Hsu J The Hypertextbook https://hypertextbook.com/facts/2000/JackHsu.shtml accessed 23 July 2013
- FDA MAUDE Database accessed 25 July 2013
- Road Safety Report http://roadsafety.transport.nsw.gov.au/downloads/fatality_rate_1908_to_2009.pdf accessed 25 July 2013
- IEC/TS 60479-1 - Effects of current on human beings and livestock https://webstore.iec.ch/publication/25402
