= Keraunography =

Belief that lightning strikes leave photographic images

Keraunography or keranography is the belief that lightning, when striking an object (generally a human body), can leave markings which constitute a photographic image of surrounding objects. It is generally considered a myth: lightning can leave markings, called Lichtenberg figures, but they are not photographic.

== Origins ==
Like most folklore, it is impossible to trace the origins of keraunography. However, it seems to have attracted scientific and media attention in England in the early 19th century, and by Victorian times the term "keraunography" had been coined to describe numerous unconnected events. With increasing scientific understanding of electricity and the popularity of photography, the time was right in the 19th century for keraunography, which seems to combine both concepts, to enter the public consciousness. However, it is likely that anecdotal accounts of keraunography had existed long before there was a word for it.

== Modern perception ==
Although to some degree science has still not fully explained all the behaviours of lightning, very few people currently accept keraunography as truth. It is evident that lightning strikes do indeed produce burn marks, and like any basically random shape (clouds, birthmarks, inkblots, etc.) it is human nature to see shapes in them. The lightning often leaves skin marks in characteristic Lichtenberg figures, sometimes called lightning flowers; they may persist for hours or days, and are a useful indicator for medical examiners when trying to determine the cause of death. Although humans being struck by lightning is of course rare, it is nonetheless possible that over a wide period of time, certain cases of burn marks would exist which could be said to resemble objects nearby the point of the lightning strike. However, these cases are almost certainly the product of coincidence, or the tree-like appearance of Lichtenberg figures, rather than evidence of any photographic property of lightning. No supposed case of keraunography has been investigated by modern science, and unless further evidence is presented, it remains a strange object of 19th-century British folklore.

== Keraunographic markings ==
In modern medical literature, "Keraunographic markings" also can refer to signs of a lightning strike injury on the skin, roughly synonymous with Lichtenberg figures or ferning patterns. These patterns can appear on a number of other materials, including wood and grass.

== Sources ==
=== General sources ===
- Pilkington, Mark (2004-06-03). "Keranography". the Guardian.
