= Susan Sinnott =

American materials scientist and researcher

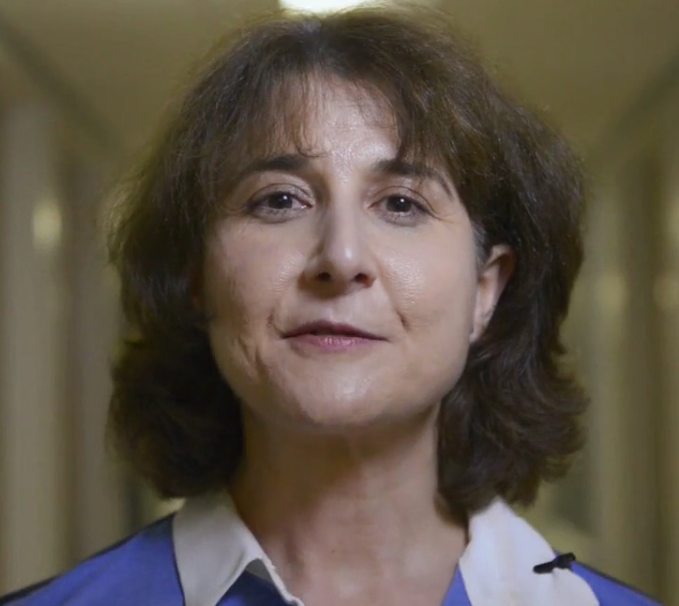
- Susan Sinnott in 2015
- Born: Susan Buthaina Sinnott
- Education: University of Texas at Austin (BS); Iowa State University (PhD)
- Awards: Fellow of the American Association for the Advancement of Science (2010)
- Scientific career
- Fields: Computational materials science Computational physics Computational chemistry
- Workplaces: Pennsylvania State University; University of Florida; University of Kentucky; United States Naval Research Laboratory
- Thesis: Density functional studies: first principles and semi-empirical calculations of clusters and surfaces (1993)
- Website: research.matse.psu.edu/sinnott

Susan Buthaina Sinnott is professor and head of materials science and engineering at Pennsylvania State University. Sinnott is a fellow of the Materials Research Society (MRS), the American Association for the Advancement of Science (AAAS) and the American Physical Society (APS). She has served as editor-in-chief of the journal Computational Materials Science since 2014.

== Early life and education ==
Sinnott received a bachelors of science in chemistry at the University of Texas at Austin. She moved to Iowa State University for her graduate studies, and earned her doctoral degree in physical chemistry in 1993.

== Research and career ==
After graduating Sinnott moved to the United States Naval Research Laboratory where she worked on surface chemistry.

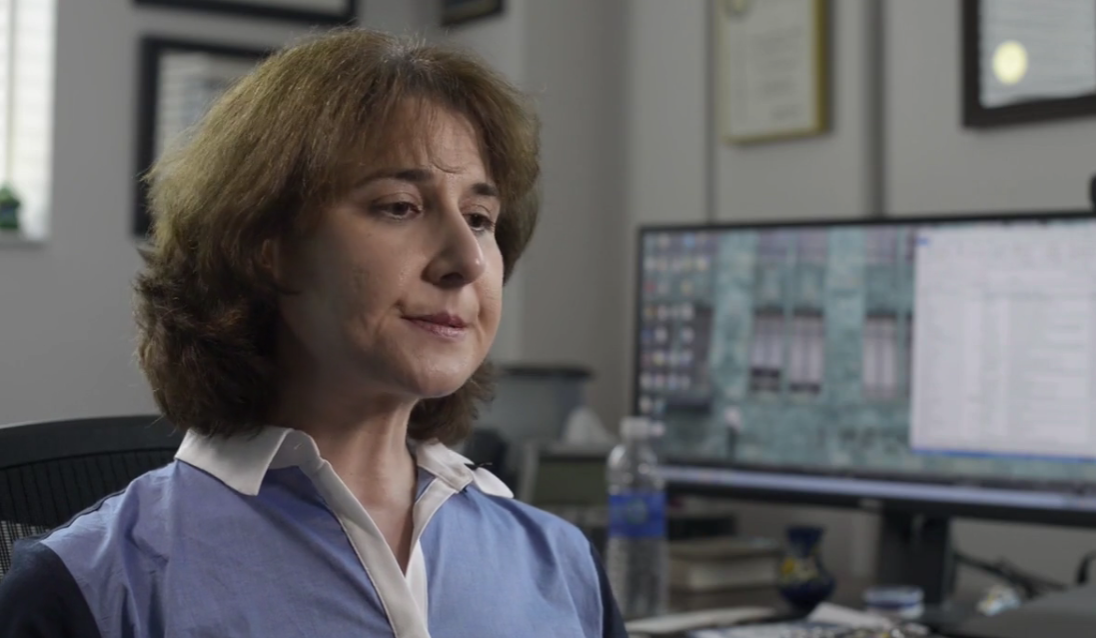
Sinnott made an openly licensed video about "Using Computers to Create New Materials" in 2015

After two years at the Naval Research Laboratory, Sinnott was appointed an assistant professor at the University of Kentucky. In 2000 she was recruited to the University of Florida as an associate professor. Sinnott was promoted to professor at the University of Florida in 2005, where she led projects on cyber infrastructure and quantum theory. In 2015 Sinnott was appointed Head of Materials Science and Engineering at the Pennsylvania State University.

Sinnott's research involves the development of computational methods to understand the electronic and atomic structure of materials. Her computational models include continuum level modelling and fluid dynamics and take into account material behaviour at the nanoscale. She has investigated the formation and role of grain boundaries, dopants, defects and heterogeneous interfaces. Her research has considered perovskites, showing that the alignment or tilting of the perovskite oxygen cages impacts the materials properties. Sinnott has served as editor-in-chief of the scientific journal Computational Materials Science since 2014.

Her principal research interests at Penn State University include two-dimensional and nano-structured materials, gas adsorption and separation in porous solid materials, and condensed matter physics.

=== Selected awards and honours ===
Her awards include:

- 2005 Elected a fellow of the American Vacuum Society
- 2009 Distinguished editor of the Physical Review Letters
- 2010 Elected a fellow of the American Association for the Advancement of Science
- 2011 Elected a fellow of the American Ceramic Society
- 2012 Elected a fellow of the Materials Research Society
- 2013 Elected a fellow of the American Physical Society
- 2013 Top 25 Women Professors in Florida

=== Selected publications ===
Her publications include

- A second-generation reactive empirical bond order (REBO) potential energy expression for hydrocarbons
- Model of carbon nanotube growth through chemical vapor deposition
- Carbon nanotubes: synthesis, properties, and applications
- Effect of chemical functionalization on the mechanical properties of carbon nanotubes
