= Macroshock =

Macroshock is a medical term for the effects of body exposed to electrical current, which can lead to severe injury or death by electrocution. It is used most often in the medical field, but is also commonly used in the fields of electrophysiology and bioengineering. Definitions of the term are inconsistent; there are three most commonly accepted definitions. Depending upon the medical text used, a macroshock is either:

- A strong electric shock resulting from current that has passed through the trunk or head, with contact to the source through intact skin. Under this definition, a macroshock is almost always lethal due to causing ventricular fibrillation of the heart.
- The passage of current from one part of the body to another, especially from arm to arm and therefore through the heart. By this definition, the magnitude of the current itself (in amperes) is the most important factor. In general, the greater the current, the more dangerous a shock is and the more likely it is to be lethal. Therefore, a high-voltage, low-current shock is not dangerous, but a low-voltage, high-current shock may cause significant harm or death.
- The passage of current between two different areas of skin. Whether or not the head or heart is involved is not considered in this definition. Therefore, such a shock might not be lethal, although it may cause severe damage via electrical breakdown of the skin.

== Sources of macroshock ==
Possible sources of macroshock include: poorly designed or malfunctioning electrophysiology equipment, lightning, damaged power cords or other electrical hazards around the household, downed power lines, high-voltage electrical equipment such as transformer stations and other industrial electrical equipment, and malfunctioning electrical or electricity-using mechanical equipment capable of delivering a strong current, or which operates at a high voltage.

== See also ==
- Microshock
- Electric shock
- Electrocution
- High voltage
