= Lichtenberg figure =

Branching shapes

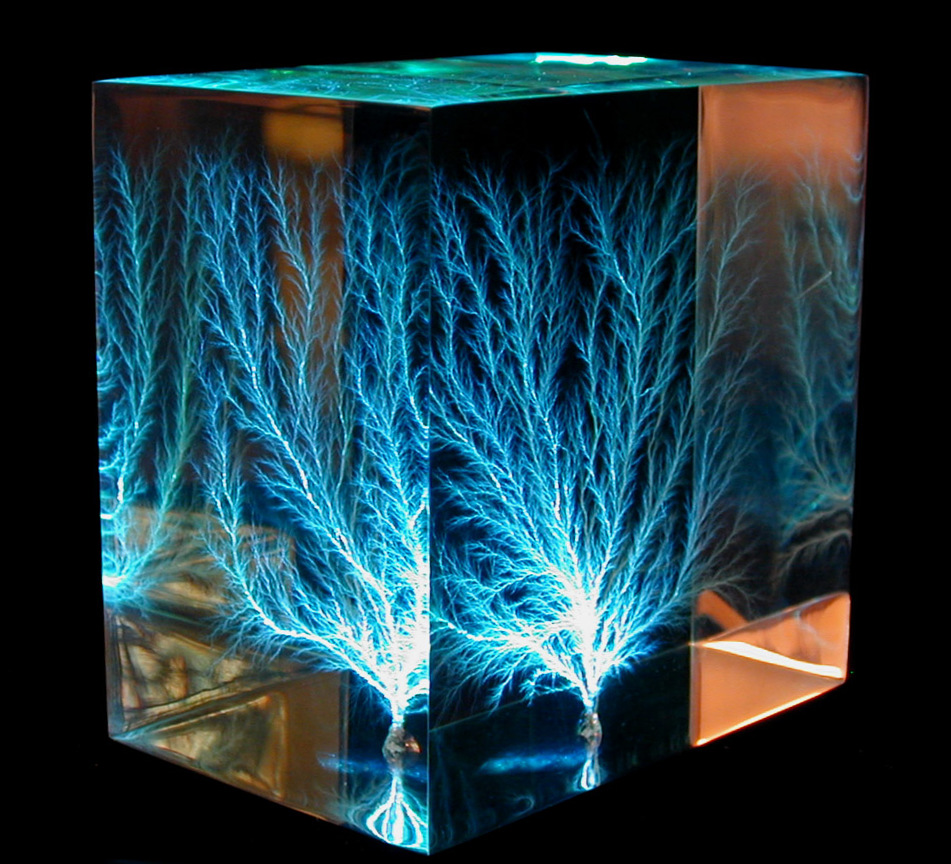
Modern 3D Lichtenberg figures or "electrical treeing" in a block of clear acrylic, created by irradiating the block with an electron beam. Actual size: 80 mm × 80 mm × 50 mm (3 in × 3 in × 2 in)

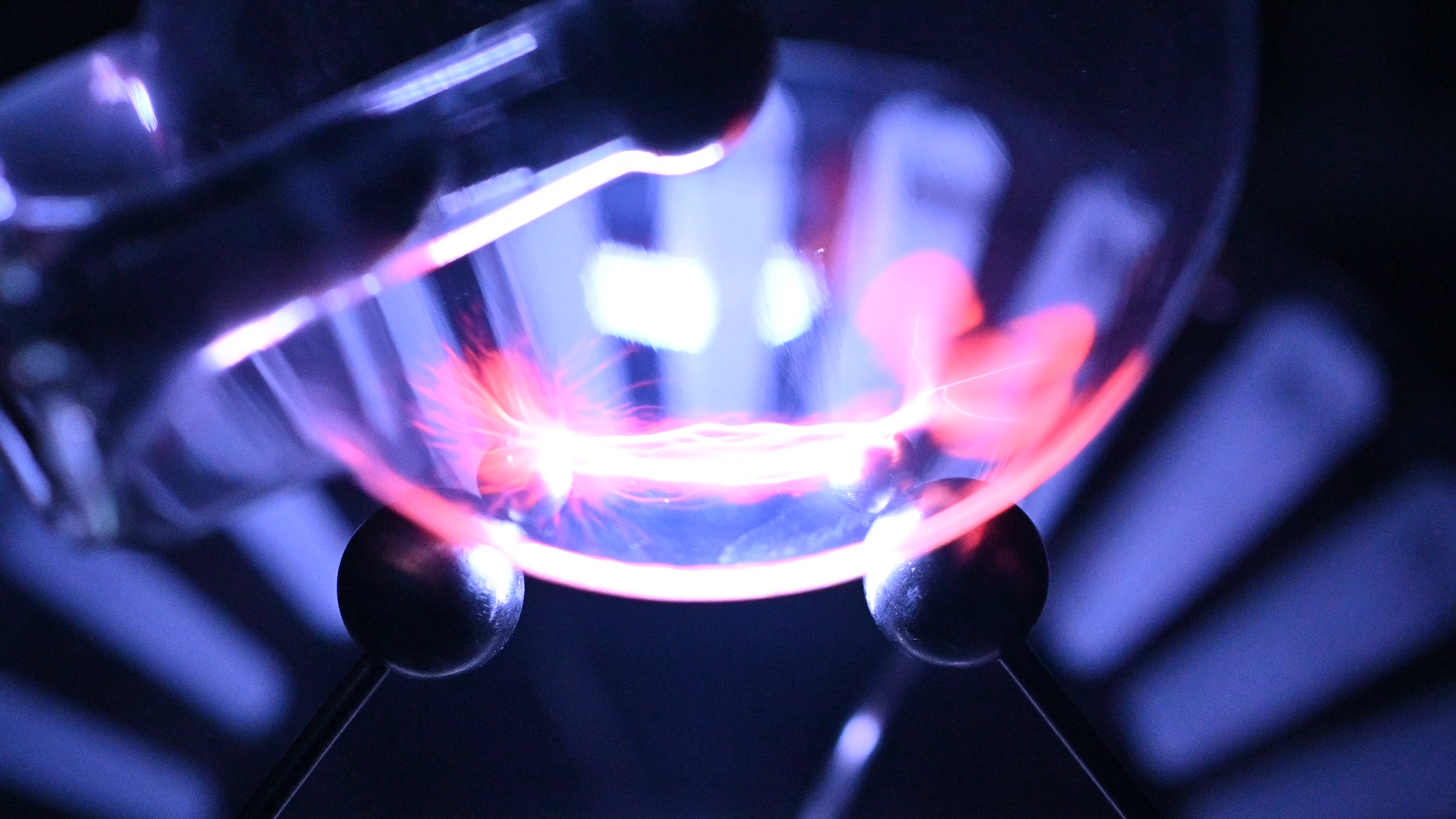
Lichtenberg figures are generated by a sliding spark discharge on the flask with a mixture of gases. Structural differences between the "positive" and "negative" figures can be observed.

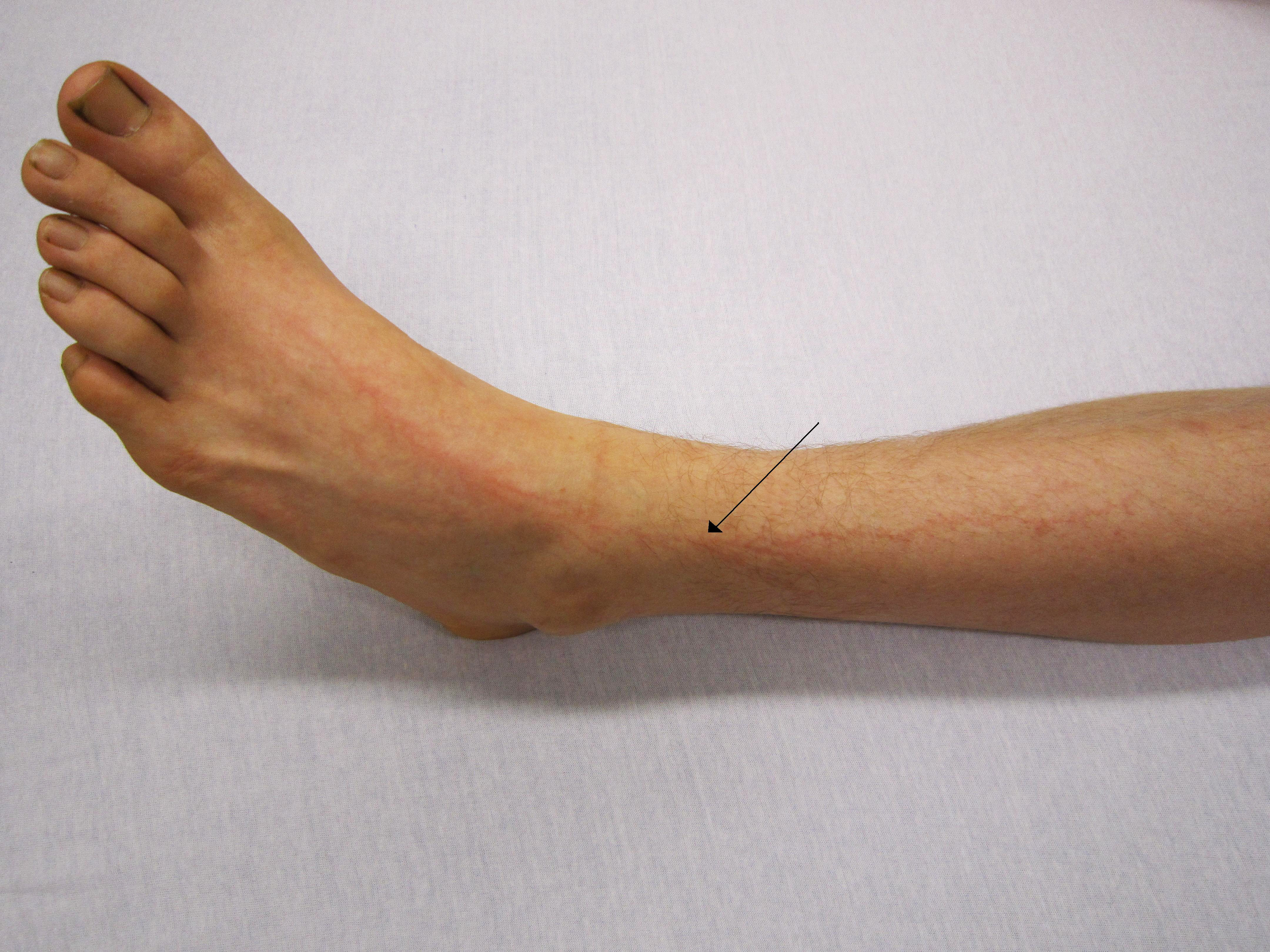
The slight branching redness traveling up this person's leg was created by current from a nearby lightning strike.

A Lichtenberg figure (German: Lichtenberg-Figur), or Lichtenberg dust figure, is a branching electric discharge that sometimes appears on the surface or in the interior of insulating materials. Lichtenberg figures are often associated with the progressive deterioration of high-voltage components and equipment. The study of planar Lichtenberg figures along insulating surfaces and 3D electrical trees within insulating materials often provides engineers with valuable insights for improving the long-term reliability of high-voltage equipment. Lichtenberg figures are now known to occur on or within solids, liquids, and gases during electrical breakdown.

Lichtenberg figures are natural phenomena that exhibit fractal properties.

== History ==
Lichtenberg figures are named after the German physicist Georg Christoph Lichtenberg, who originally discovered and studied them. When they were first discovered, it was thought that their characteristic shapes might help to reveal the nature of positive and negative electric "fluids".

In 1777, Lichtenberg built a large electrophorus to generate high-voltage static electricity through induction. After discharging a high-voltage point to the surface of an insulator, he recorded the resulting radial patterns by sprinkling various powdered materials onto the surface. By then pressing blank sheets of paper onto these patterns, Lichtenberg was able to transfer and record these images, thereby discovering the basic principle of modern xerography.

This discovery was also the forerunner of the modern day science of plasma physics. Although Lichtenberg only studied two-dimensional (2D) figures, modern high-voltage researchers study 2D and 3D figures (electrical trees) on, and within, insulating materials.

== Formation ==
Two-dimensional (2D) Lichtenberg figures can be produced by placing a sharp-pointed needle perpendicular to the surface of a non-conducting plate, such as of resin, ebonite, or glass. The point is positioned very near or contacting the plate. A source of high voltage such as a Leyden jar (an early type of capacitor) or a static electricity generator is applied to the needle, typically through a spark gap. This creates a sudden, small electrical discharge along the surface of the plate. This deposits stranded areas of charge onto the surface of the plate. These electrified areas are then tested by sprinkling a mixture of powdered flowers of sulfur and red lead (Pb_{3}O_{4} or lead tetroxide) onto the plate.

Sulfur and red lead exhibit the triboelectric effect. During handling, powdered sulfur particles tend to acquire a negative charge. Similarly, powdered red lead particles tend to acquire a positive charge. The negatively-charged sulfur particles are electrostatically attracted and adhere to the positively electrified areas of the plate, while the positively charged red lead particles are attracted to the negatively electrified areas.

In addition to the distribution of colors thereby produced, there is also a marked difference in the form of the figure, according to the polarity of the electrical charge that was applied to the plate. If the charged areas were positive, a widely extending patch is seen on the plate, consisting of a dense nucleus from which branches radiate in all directions. Negatively charged areas are considerably smaller and have a sharp circular or fan-like boundary entirely devoid of branches. Heinrich Rudolf Hertz employed Lichtenberg dust figures in his seminal work proving Maxwell's electromagnetic wave theories.

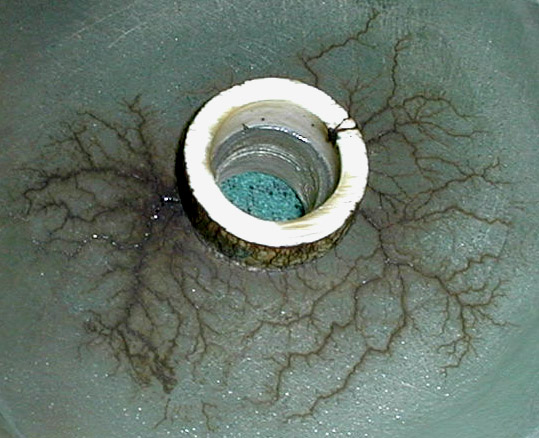
Carbonized high-voltage discharge tracks cross the surface of a polycarbonate sheet.

If the plate receives a mixture of positive and negative charges as, for example, from an induction coil, a mixed figure results, consisting of a large red central nucleus, corresponding to the negative charge, surrounded by yellow rays, corresponding to the positive charge. The difference between positive and negative figures seems to depend on the presence of air, for the difference tends to disappear when the experiment is conducted in a vacuum. Peter T. Riess (a 19th-century researcher) theorized that the negative electrification of the plate was caused by the friction of the water vapour, etc., driven along the surface by the explosion that accompanies the disruptive discharge at the point. This electrification would favor the spread of a positive, but hinder that of a negative discharge.

It is now known that electrical charges are transferred to the insulator's surface through small spark discharges that occur along the boundary between the gas and insulator surface. Once transferred to the insulator, these excess charges become temporarily stranded. The shapes of the resulting charge distributions reflect the shape of the spark discharges which, in turn, depend on the high voltage polarity and pressure of the gas. Using a higher applied voltage will generate larger-diameter and more branched figures. It is now known that positive Lichtenberg figures have longer, branching structures because long sparks within air can more easily form and propagate from positively charged high-voltage terminals. This property has been used to measure the transient voltage polarity and magnitude of lightning surges on electrical power lines.

Another type of 2D Lichtenberg figure can be created when an insulating surface becomes contaminated with semiconducting material. When a high voltage is applied across the surface, leakage currents may cause localized heating and progressive degradation and charring of the underlying material. Over time, branching, tree-like carbonized patterns are formed upon the surface of the insulator, called electrical trees. This degradation process is called tracking. If the conductive paths ultimately bridge the insulating space, the result is catastrophic failure of the insulating material. Some artists moisten the surface of wood or cardboard with a semiconductive electrolytic solution and then apply a high voltage across the surface to induce tracking, thereby creating complex carbonized 2D Fractal burning on the surface.

=== Fractal similarities ===
The branching, self-similar patterns observed in Lichtenberg figures exhibit fractal properties. Lichtenberg figures often develop during the dielectric breakdown of solids, liquids, and even gases. Their appearance and growth appear to be related to a process called diffusion-limited aggregation (DLA). A useful macroscopic model that combines an electric field with DLA was developed by Niemeyer, Pietronero, and Weismann in 1984, and is known as the dielectric breakdown model (DBM).

Although the electrical breakdown mechanisms of air and PMMA plastic are considerably different, the branching discharge structures turn out to be related. The branching forms taken by natural lightning also have fractal characteristics.

=== Constructal law ===
Lichtenberg figures are examples of natural phenomena that exhibit fractal properties. The emergence and evolution of these and the other tree-like structures that abound in nature are summarized by the constructal law. First published by Duke professor Adrian Bejan in 1996, the constructal law is a first principle of physics that summarizes the tendency in nature to generate configurations (patterns, designs) that facilitate the free movement of the imposed currents that flow through it. The constructal law predicts that the tree-like designs described in this article should emerge and evolve to facilitate the movement (point-to-area) of the electrical currents flowing through them.

== Natural occurrences ==
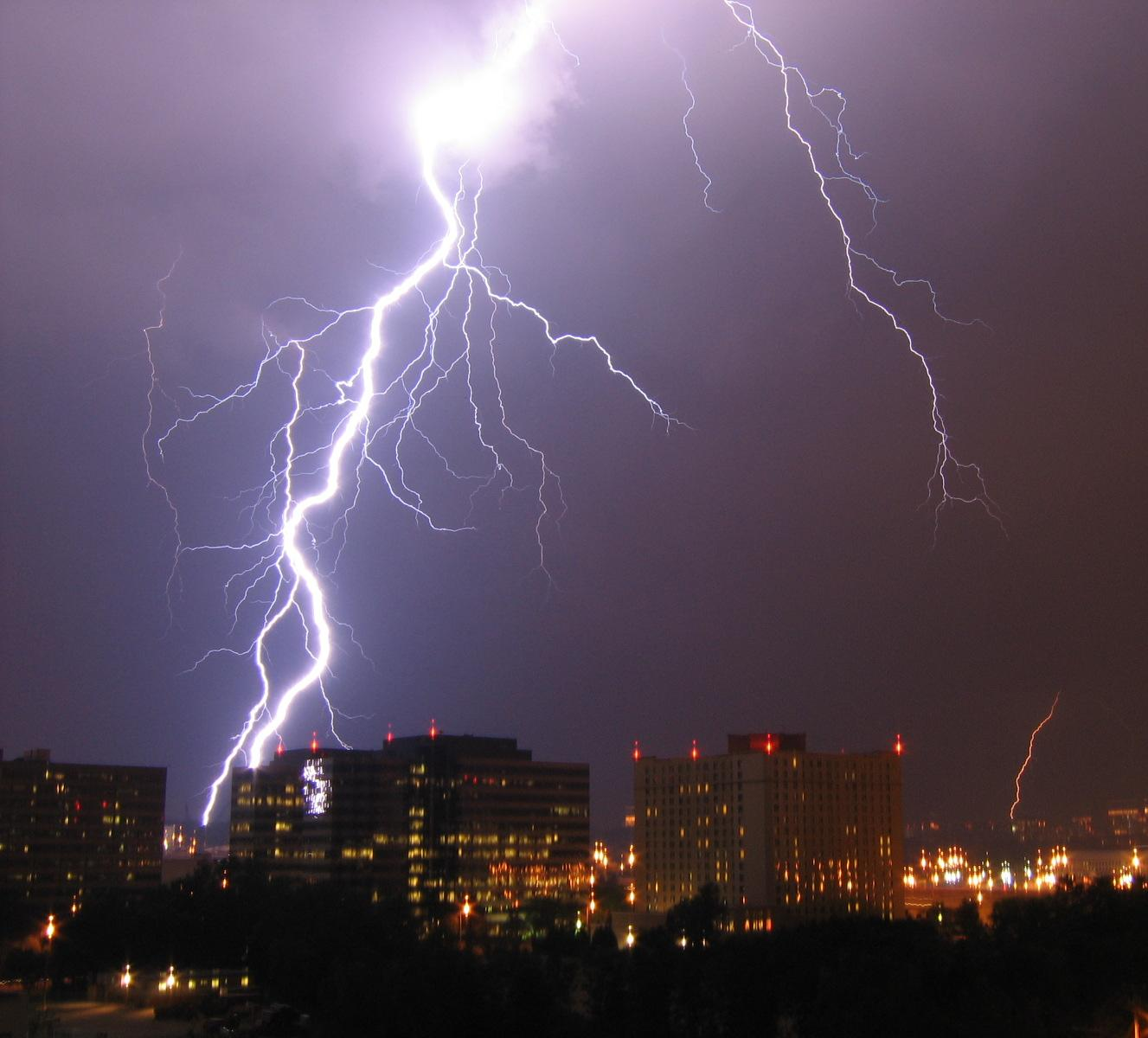
Lightning is a naturally occurring three-dimensional Lichtenberg figure.

Lichtenberg figures are fern-like patterns that may appear on the skin of lightning strike victims and typically disappear in 24 hours. They are also known as Keraunographic markings.

A lightning strike can also create a large Lichtenberg figure in grass surrounding the point struck. These are sometimes found on golf courses or in grassy meadows. Branching root-shaped "fulgurite" mineral deposits may also be created as sand and soil are fused into glassy tubes by the intense ionizing electrical current, an effect often seen in chemical vapor deposition when using arc discharge to produce carbon nanotubes.

Electrical treeing often occurs in high-voltage equipment prior to causing complete breakdown. Following these Lichtenberg figures within the insulation during post-accident investigation of an insulation failure can be useful in finding the cause of breakdown. From the direction and shape of the trees and their branches, an experienced high-voltage engineer can see exactly the point where the insulation began to break down, and using that knowledge, possibly find the initial cause as well. Broken-down transformers, high-voltage cables, bushings, and other equipment can usefully be investigated in this manner. The insulation is unrolled (in the case of paper insulation) or sliced in thin slices (in the case of solid insulating materials). The results are then sketched or photographed to create a record of the breakdown process.

== In insulating materials ==
Modern Lichtenberg figures can also be created within solid insulating materials, such as acrylic (polymethyl methacrylate, or PMMA) or glass by injecting them with a beam of high energy electrons from an electron beam accelerator, such as a LINAC (or Linac, a type of particle accelerator). Inside the Linac, electrons are focused and accelerated to form a beam of high-speed particles. Electrons emerging from the accelerator can have energies up to 25 MeV and are moving at an appreciable fraction (95 – 99+ percent) of the speed of light (relativistic velocities).

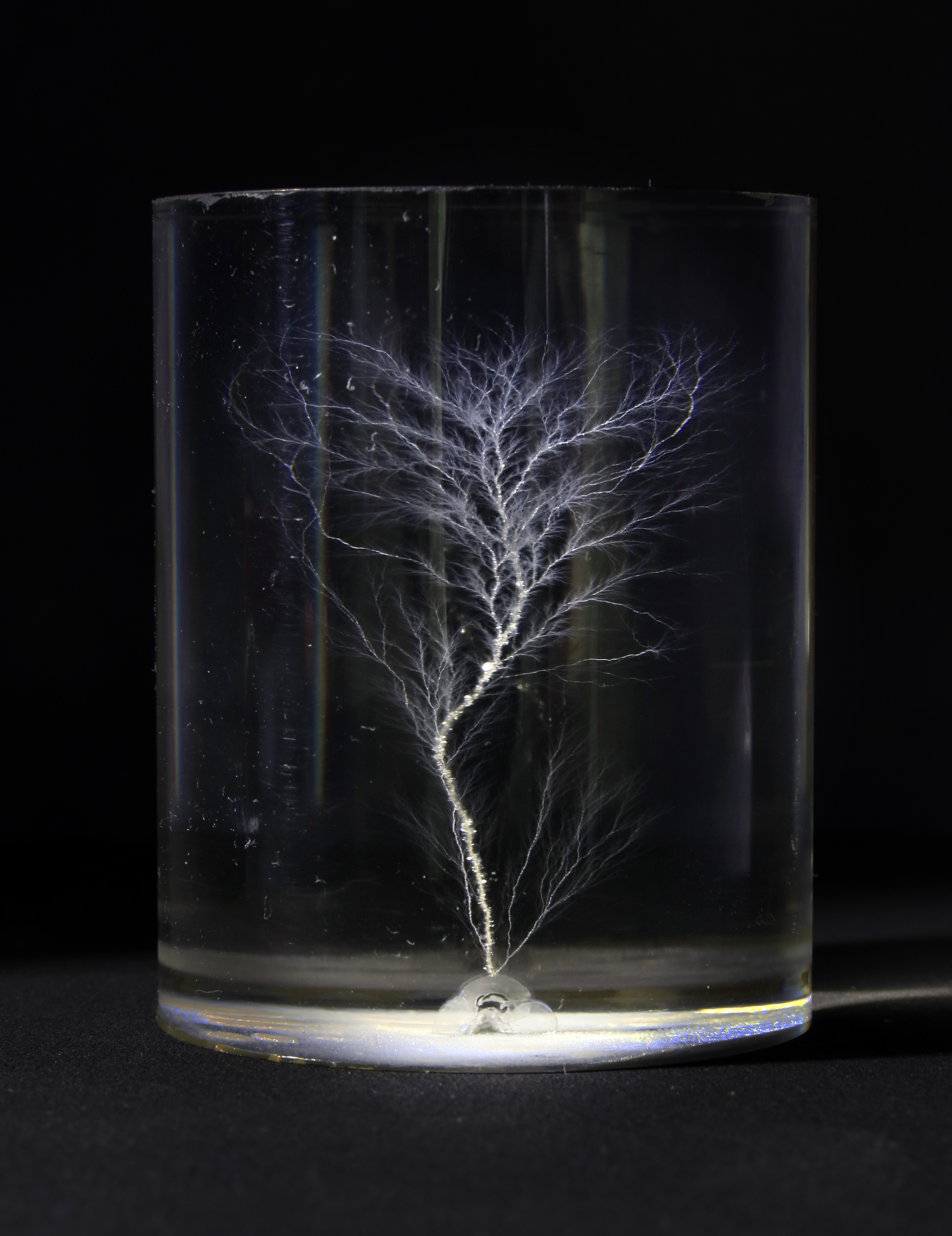
Lichtenberg figure captured in an acrylic block.

If the electron beam is aimed towards a thick acrylic specimen, the electrons easily penetrate the surface of the acrylic, rapidly decelerating as they collide with molecules inside the plastic, finally coming to rest deep inside the specimen. Since acrylic is an excellent electrical insulator, these electrons become temporarily trapped within the specimen, forming a plane of excess negative charge. Positive "mirror" charges are attracted by the building internal negative charge, accumulating on the outer surfaces of the specimen. Under continued irradiation, the amount of trapped charge builds until the effective voltage inside the specimen reaches millions of volts. Once the electrical stress exceeds the dielectric strength of the plastic, some portions suddenly become conductive in a process called dielectric breakdown.

During breakdown, branching tree or fern-like conductive channels rapidly form and propagate through the plastic, allowing the trapped charge to suddenly rush out in a miniature lightning-like flash and bang. Breakdown of a charged specimen may also be manually triggered by poking the plastic with a pointed conductive object to create a point of excessive voltage stress. During the discharge, the powerful electric sparks leave thousands of branching chains of fractures behind, creating a permanent Lichtenberg figure inside the specimen. Although the internal charge within the specimen is negative, the discharge is initiated from the positively charged exterior surfaces of the specimen, so that the resulting discharge creates a positive Lichtenberg figure. These objects are sometimes called electron trees, beam trees, or lightning trees.

As the electrons rapidly decelerate inside the acrylic, they also generate powerful X-rays. Residual electrons and X-rays darken the acrylic by introducing defects (color centers) in a process called solarization. Solarization initially turns acrylic specimens a lime green color, which then changes to an amber color after the specimen has been discharged. The color usually fades over time, and gentle heating, combined with oxygen, accelerates the fading process.

== On wood ==
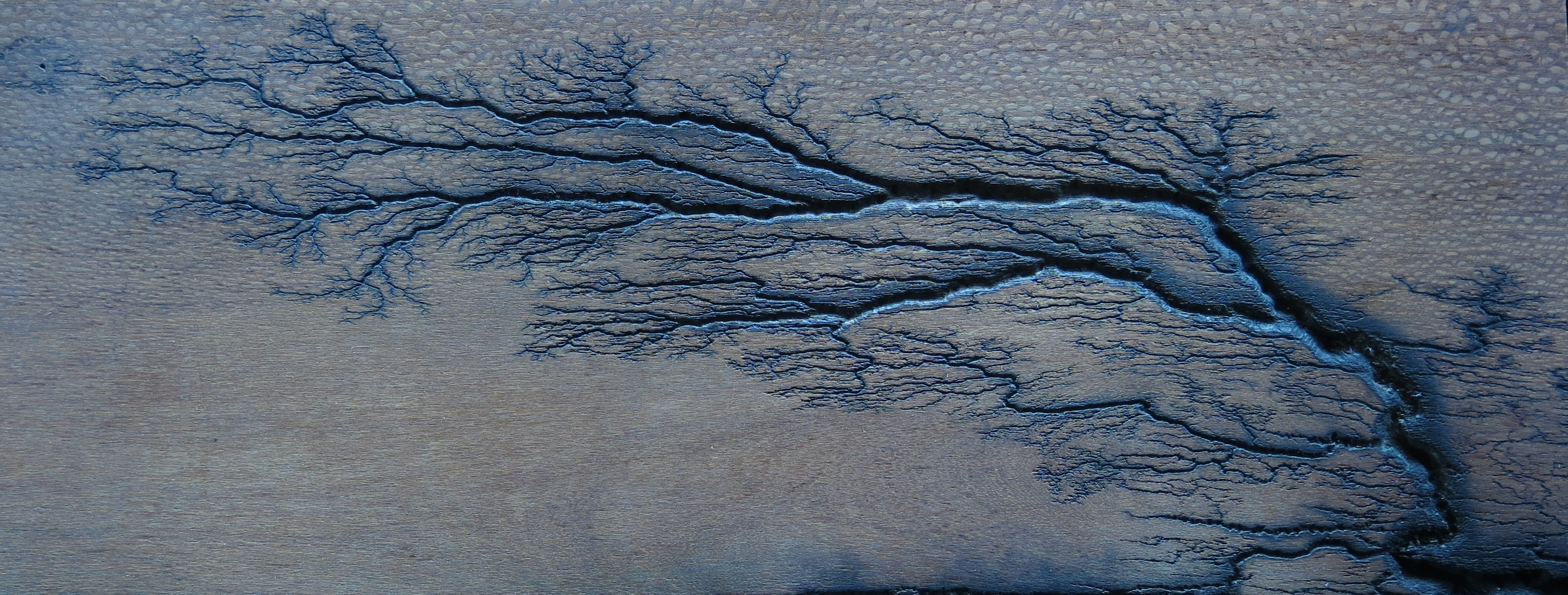
Lichtenberg branching figure in leopardwood.

Lichtenberg figures can also be produced on wood. The types of wood and grain patterns affect the shape of the Lichtenberg figure produced. By applying a coat of electrolytic solution to the surface of the wood, the resistance of the surface drops considerably. Two electrodes are then placed on the wood and a high voltage is passed across them. Current from the electrodes will cause the surface of the wood to heat up until the electrolyte boils and the wooden surface burns. Because the charred surface of the wood is mildly conductive, the surface of the wood will burn in a pattern outwards from the electrodes. Applying fractal burning to wood can be dangerous; it results in deaths every year from electrocution.

== See also ==
- Dielectric breakdown model
- Fractal curve
- Kirlian photography
- Lightning burn
- Patterns in nature
- Diffusion-limited aggregation
