= Eden growth model =

Discrete model for simulating natural growth processes

The Eden growth model describes the growth of specific types of clusters such as bacterial colonies and deposition of materials. These clusters grow by random accumulation of material on their boundary. These are also an example of a surface fractal. The model, named after Murray Eden, was first described in 1961 as a way of studying biological growth, and was simulated on a computer for clusters up to about 32,000 cells. By the mid-1980s, clusters with a billion cells had been grown, and a slight anisotropy had been observed.

== See also ==
- Diffusion-limited aggregation
