= Thomas Witten =

American theoretical physicist

Thomas Witten is an American theoretical physicist working in the field of soft matter physics.

== Biography ==
Witten received his doctorate in physics in 1971 from the University of California, San Diego. He is currently the Homer J. Livingston Professor in the James Franck Institute at the University of Chicago. He is known in particular for his work on diffusion-limited aggregation, crumpled sheets and coffee rings. His current research interests include polymers, complex fluids and granular materials. He cowrote the "Structured Fluids: Polymers, Colloids, Surfactants" (ISBN 019958382X) together with Philip Pincus.

In 2002 he received the American Physical Society Polymer Physics Prize and he is an elected fellow of the American Academy of Arts and Sciences. In 2010 he held the Lorentz Chair at Leiden University.
