= Synthesis of carbon nanotubes =

Class of manufacturing

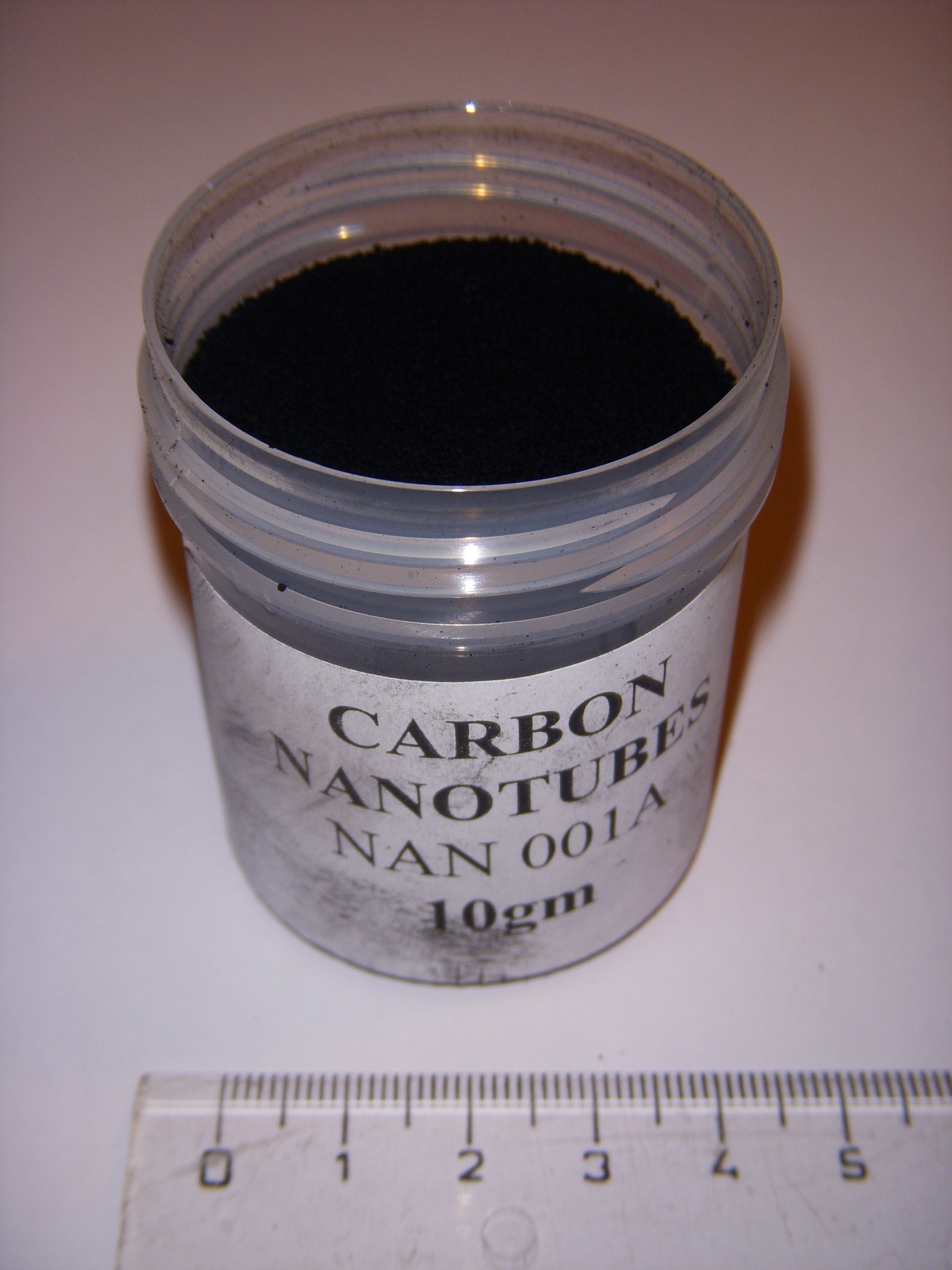
Powder of carbon nanotubes

Techniques have been developed to produce carbon nanotubes (CNTs) in sizable quantities, including arc discharge, laser ablation, high-pressure carbon monoxide disproportionation, and chemical vapor deposition (CVD). Most of these processes take place in a vacuum or with process gases. CVD growth of CNTs can occur in a vacuum or at atmospheric pressure. Large quantities of nanotubes can be synthesized by these methods; advances in catalysis and continuous growth are making CNTs more commercially viable.

== Types ==
=== Arc discharge ===
Nanotubes were observed in 1991 in the carbon soot of graphite electrodes during an arc discharge, by using a current of 100 amps, that was intended to produce fullerenes. However the first macroscopic production of carbon nanotubes was made in 1992 by two researchers at NEC's Fundamental Research Laboratory. The method used was the same as in 1991. During this process, the carbon contained in the negative electrode sublimates because of the high-discharge temperatures.

The yield for this method is up to 30% by weight and it produces both single- and multi-walled nanotubes with lengths of up to 50 micrometers with few structural defects. Arc-discharge technique uses higher temperatures (above 1,700 °C) for CNT synthesis which typically causes the expansion of CNTs with fewer structural defects in comparison with other methods.

=== Laser ablation ===
In laser ablation, a pulsed laser vaporizes a graphite target in a high-temperature reactor while an inert gas is led into the chamber. Nanotubes develop on the cooler surfaces of the reactor as the vaporized carbon condenses. A water-cooled surface may be included in the system to collect the nanotubes.

This process was developed by Richard Smalley and co-workers at Rice University, who at the time of the discovery of carbon nanotubes, were blasting metals with a laser to produce various metal molecules. When they heard of the existence of nanotubes they replaced the metals with graphite to create multi-walled carbon nanotubes. Later that year the team used a composite of graphite and metal catalyst particles (the best yield was from a cobalt and nickel mixture) to synthesize single-walled carbon nanotubes.

The laser ablation method yields around 70% and produces primarily single-walled carbon nanotubes with a controllable diameter determined by the reaction temperature. However, it is more expensive than either arc discharge or chemical vapor deposition.

=== Plasma torch ===
Single-walled carbon nanotubes can also be synthesized by a thermal plasma method, first invented in 2000 at INRS (Institut national de la recherche scientifique) in Varennes, Canada, by Olivier Smiljanic. In this method, the aim is to reproduce the conditions prevailing in the arc discharge and laser ablation approaches, but a carbon-containing gas is used instead of graphite vapors to supply the necessary carbon. Doing so, the growth of SWNT is more efficient (decomposing the gas can be 10 times less energy-consuming than graphite vaporization). The process is also continuous and low-cost. A gaseous mixture of argon, ethylene and ferrocene is introduced into a microwave plasma torch, where it is atomized by the atmospheric pressure plasma, which has the form of an intense 'flame'. The fumes created by the flame contain SWNT, metallic and carbon nanoparticles and amorphous carbon.

Another way to produce single-walled carbon nanotubes with a plasma torch is to use the induction thermal plasma method, implemented in 2005 by groups from the Université de Sherbrooke and the National Research Council of Canada. The method is similar to arc discharge in that both use ionized gas to reach the high temperature necessary to vaporize carbon-containing substances and the metal catalysts necessary for the ensuing nanotube growth. The thermal plasma is induced by high-frequency oscillating currents in a coil, and is maintained in flowing inert gas. Typically, a feedstock of carbon black and metal catalyst particles is fed into the plasma, and then cooled down to form single-walled carbon nanotubes. Different single-wall carbon nanotube diameter distributions can be synthesized.

The induction thermal plasma method can produce up to 2 grams of nanotube material per minute, which is higher than the arc discharge or the laser ablation methods.

=== Chemical vapor deposition (CVD) ===
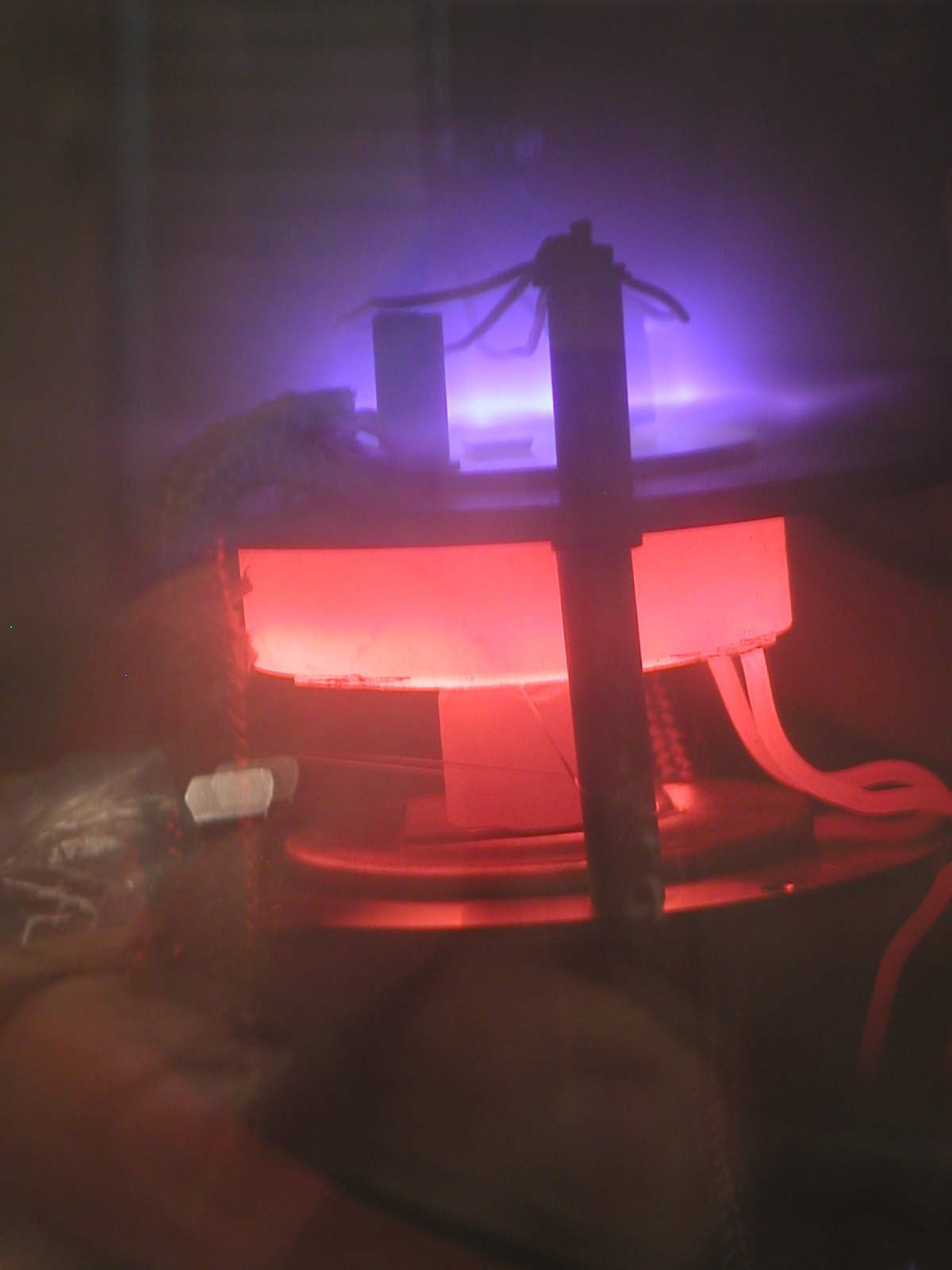
Nanotubes being grown by plasma enhanced chemical vapor deposition

Animated pent-first nucleation.

The catalytic vapor phase deposition of carbon was reported in 1952 and 1959, but it was not until 1993 that carbon nanotubes were formed by this process. In 2007, researchers at the University of Cincinnati (UC) developed a process to grow aligned carbon nanotube arrays of length 18 mm on a FirstNano ET3000 carbon nanotube growth system.

During CVD, a substrate is prepared with a layer of metal catalyst particles, most commonly nickel, cobalt, iron, or a combination. The metal nanoparticles can also be produced by other ways, including reduction of oxides or oxides solid solutions. The diameters of the nanotubes that are to be grown are related to the size of the metal particles. This can be controlled by patterned (or masked) deposition of the metal, annealing, or by plasma etching of a metal layer. The substrate is heated to approximately 700 °C. To initiate the growth of nanotubes, two gases are bled into the reactor: a process gas (such as ammonia, nitrogen or hydrogen) and a carbon-containing gas (such as acetylene, ethylene, ethanol or methane). Nanotubes grow at the sites of the metal catalyst; the carbon-containing gas is broken apart at the surface of the catalyst particle, and the carbon is transported to the edges of the particle, where it forms the nanotubes. This mechanism is still being studied. The catalyst particles can stay at the tips of the growing nanotube during growth, or remain at the nanotube base, depending on the adhesion between the catalyst particle and the substrate. Thermal catalytic decomposition of hydrocarbon has become an active area of research and can be a promising route for the bulk production of CNTs. Fluidized bed reactor is the most widely used reactor for CNT preparation. Scale-up of the reactor is the major challenge.

CVD is the most widely used method for the production of carbon nanotubes. For this purpose, the metal nanoparticles are mixed with a catalyst support such as MgO or Al_{2}O_{3} to increase the surface area for higher yield of the catalytic reaction of the carbon feedstock with the metal particles. One issue in this synthesis route is the removal of the catalyst support via an acid treatment, which sometimes could destroy the original structure of the carbon nanotubes. However, alternative catalyst supports that are soluble in water have proven effective for nanotube growth.

If a plasma is generated by the application of a strong electric field during growth (plasma-enhanced chemical vapor deposition), then the nanotube growth will follow the direction of the electric field. By adjusting the geometry of the reactor it is possible to synthesize vertically aligned carbon nanotubes (i.e., perpendicular to the substrate), a morphology that has been of interest to researchers interested in electron emission from nanotubes. Without the plasma, the resulting nanotubes are often randomly oriented. Under certain reaction conditions, even in the absence of a plasma, closely spaced nanotubes will maintain a vertical growth direction resulting in a dense array of tubes resembling a carpet or forest.

Of the various means for nanotube synthesis, CVD shows the most promise for industrial-scale deposition, because of its price/unit ratio, and because CVD is capable of growing nanotubes directly on a desired substrate, whereas the nanotubes must be collected in the other growth techniques. The growth sites are controllable by careful deposition of the catalyst. In 2007, a team from Meijo University demonstrated a high-efficiency CVD technique for growing carbon nanotubes from camphor. Researchers at Rice University, until recently led by the late Richard Smalley, have concentrated on finding methods to produce large, pure amounts of particular types of nanotubes. Their approach grows long fibers from many small seeds cut from a single nanotube; all of the resulting fibers were found to be of the same diameter as the original nanotube and are expected to be of the same type as the original nanotube.

==== Super-growth CVD ====
Super-growth CVD (water-assisted chemical vapor deposition) was developed by Kenji Hata, Sumio Iijima and co-workers at AIST, Japan. In this process, the activity and lifetime of the catalyst are enhanced by the addition of water into the CVD reactor. Dense millimeter-tall vertically aligned nanotube arrays (VANTAs) or "forests", aligned normal to the substrate, were produced. The forests' height could be expressed, as

$$H(t) = {\beta}{\tau}_o ({1 - e^{-t / {\tau}_o}}).$$

where β is the initial growth rate and ${\tau}_o$ is the characteristic catalyst lifetime.

Their specific surface exceeds 1,000 m^{2}/g (capped) or 2,200 m^{2}/g (uncapped), surpassing the value of 400–1,000 m^{2}/g for HiPco samples. The synthesis efficiency is about 100 times higher than for the laser ablation method. The time required to make SWNT forests of the height of 2.5 mm by this method was 10 minutes in 2004. Those SWNT forests can be easily separated from the catalyst, yielding clean SWNT material (purity >99.98%) without further purification. For comparison, the as-grown HiPco CNTs contain about 5–35% of metal impurities; it is therefore purified through dispersion and centrifugation that damages the nanotubes. Super-growth avoids this problem. Patterned highly organized single-walled nanotube structures were successfully fabricated using the super-growth technique.

The super-growth method is essentially a variation of CVD. Therefore, it is possible to grow material containing SWNT, DWNTs and MWNTs, and to alter their ratios by tuning the growth conditions. Their ratios change by the thinness of the catalyst. Many MWNTs are included so that the diameter of the tube is wide.

The vertically aligned nanotube forests originate from a "zipping effect" when they are immersed in a solvent and dried. The zipping effect is caused by the surface tension of the solvent and the van der Waals forces between the carbon nanotubes. It aligns the nanotubes into a dense material, which can be formed in various shapes, such as sheets and bars, by applying weak compression during the process. Densification increases the Vickers hardness by about 70 times and density is 0.55 g/cm^{3}. The packed carbon nanotubes are more than 1 mm long and have a carbon purity of 99.9% or higher; they also retain the desirable alignment properties of the nanotubes forest.

=== Liquid electrolysis method ===
In 2015, researchers at George Washington University discovered a new pathway to synthesize MWCNTs by electrolysis of molten carbonates. The mechanism is similar to CVD. Some metal ions were reduced to a metal form and attached on the cathode as the nucleation point for the growing of CNTs. The reaction on the cathode is

$$\ce{Li2CO3 -> Li2O + CNTs + O2}$$

The formed lithium oxide can in-situ absorb carbon dioxide (if present) and form lithium carbonate, as shown in the equation.

$$\ce{Li2O + CO2 -> Li2CO3}$$

Thus the net reaction is

$$\ce{CO2 -> CNTs + O2}$$

In other words, the reactant is only greenhouse gas of carbon dioxide, while the product is high valued CNTs. This discovery was highlighted as a possible technology for carbon dioxide capture and conversion. Later on non-lithium molten carbonate electrolytes were demonstrated or electrolyte consisting of lithium carbonate plus some other carbonate and/or additive. Additionally, by changing electrolysis conditions such as electrolyte, electrode, temperature, and/or current density, a wide range of carbon nanotubes can be grown through this process including: helical; thin; thick; doped with either nitrogen, boron, sulfur, or phosphorus; bulbous; and more with multiple macrostructures being produced, some quite porous with potential uses as sponge or electrodes. This method can also utilize non-gas source of carbon, such as from calcium carbonate (CaCO_{3}), in which case it produces lime/cement (CaO) free of CO_{2} as that CO_{2} turns into CNTs and oxygen.

=== Natural, incidental, and controlled flame environments ===
Fullerenes and carbon nanotubes are not necessarily products of high-tech laboratories; they are commonly formed in such mundane places as ordinary flames, produced by burning methane, ethylene, and benzene, and they have been found in soot from both indoor and outdoor air. However, these naturally occurring varieties can be highly irregular in size and quality because the environment in which they are produced is often highly uncontrolled. Thus, although they can be used in some applications, they can lack in the high degree of uniformity necessary to satisfy the many needs of both research and industry. Recent efforts have focused on producing more uniform carbon nanotubes in controlled flame environments. Such methods have promise for large-scale, low-cost nanotube synthesis based on theoretical models, though they must compete with rapidly developing large scale CVD production.

== Purification ==
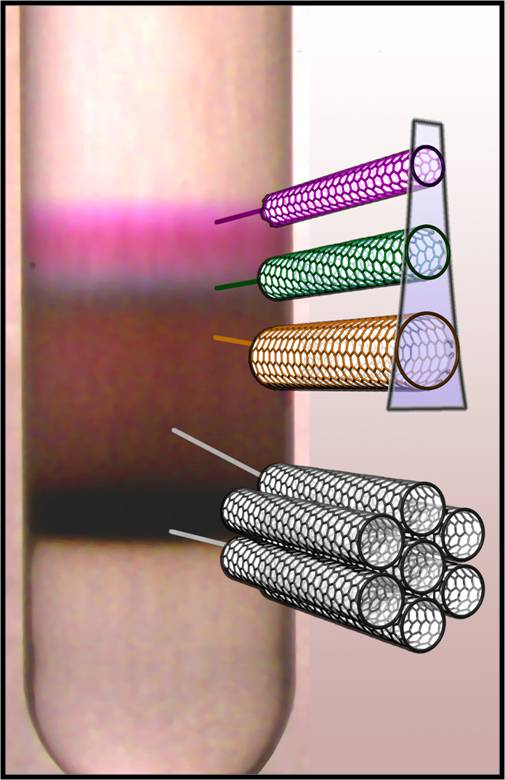
Centrifuge tube with a solution of carbon nanotubes, which were sorted by diameter using density-gradient ultracentrifugation.

=== Removal of catalysts ===
Nanoscale metal catalysts are important ingredients for fixed- and fluidized-bed CVD synthesis of CNTs. They allow increasing the growth efficiency of CNTs and may give control over their structure and chirality. During synthesis, catalysts can convert carbon precursors into tubular carbon structures but can also form encapsulating carbon overcoats. Together with metal oxide supports they may therefore attach to or become incorporated into the CNT product. The presence of metal impurities can be problematic for many applications. Especially catalyst metals like nickel, cobalt or yttrium may be of toxicological concern. While unencapsulated catalyst metals may be readily removable by acid washing, encapsulated ones require oxidative treatment for opening their carbon shell. The effective removal of catalysts, especially of encapsulated ones, while preserving the CNT structure is a challenge and has been addressed in many studies. A new approach to break carbonaceous catalyst encapsulations is based on rapid thermal annealing.

== Application-related issues ==
Many electronic applications of carbon nanotubes crucially rely on techniques of selectively producing either semiconducting or metallic CNTs, preferably of a certain chirality. Several methods of separating semiconducting and metallic CNTs are known, but most of them are not yet suitable for large-scale technological processes. The most efficient method relies on density-gradient ultracentrifugation, which separates surfactant-wrapped nanotubes by the minute difference in their density. This density difference often translates into a difference in the nanotube diameter and (semi)conducting properties. Another method of separation uses a sequence of freezing, thawing, and compression of SWNTs embedded in agarose gel. This process results in a solution containing 70% metallic SWNTs and leaves a gel containing 95% semiconducting SWNTs. The diluted solutions separated by this method show various colors. The separated carbon nanotubes using this method have been applied to electrodes, e.g. electric double-layer capacitor. Moreover, SWNTs can be separated by the column chromatography method. Yield is 95% in semiconductor type SWNT and 90% in metallic type SWNT.

In addition to the separation of semiconducting and metallic SWNTs, it is possible to sort SWNTs by length, diameter, and chirality. The highest resolution length sorting, with length variation of <10%, has thus far been achieved by size-exclusion chromatography (SEC) of DNA-dispersed carbon nanotubes (DNA-SWNT). SWNT diameter separation has been achieved by density-gradient ultracentrifugation (DGU) using surfactant-dispersed SWNTs and by ion-exchange chromatography (IEC) for DNA-SWNT. Purification of individual chiralities has also been demonstrated with IEC of DNA-SWNT: specific short DNA oligomers can be used to isolate individual SWNT chiralities. Thus far, 12 chiralities have been isolated at purities ranging from 70% for (8,3) and (9,5) SWNTs to 90% for (6,5), (7,5) and (10,5) SWNTs. Alternatively, carbon nanotubes have been successfully sorted by chirality using the aqueous two-phase extraction method. There have been successful efforts to integrate these purified nanotubes into electronic devices, such as field-effect transistors.

An alternative to separation is the development of a selective growth of semiconducting or metallic CNTs. This can be achieved by CVD that involves a combination of ethanol and methanol gases on a quartz substrate, resulting in horizontally aligned arrays of 95–98% semiconducting nanotubes.

Nanotubes are usually grown on nanoparticles of magnetic metal (Fe, Co), which facilitates the production of electronic (spintronic) devices. In particular, control of current through a field-effect transistor by magnetic field has been demonstrated in such a single-tube nanostructure.
