= Meitner =

Meitner may refer to the following:

- Meitner (surname), for people with that name
- 6999 Meitner, main-belt asteroid
- Meitner (Venusian crater), a multiring impact basin on Venus
- Meitner (lunar crater), impact crater on the far side of the Moon
- Meitner–Hupfeld effect, particle physics phenomenon

== See also ==
- Hahn-Meitner-Institut, today part of Helmholtz-Zentrum Berlin
