= Meitner (surname) =

Meitner is a surname. Notable people with the surname include:

- Erika Meitner (born 1975), American poet
- Lise Meitner (1878–1968), Austrian-Swedish nuclear physicist
- Philipp Meitner (1838–1910), Austrian lawyer and chess master; father of Lise

== See also ==
- Lotte Meitner-Graf (1898–1973), Austrian photographer
- meitnerium, chemical element named after Lise Meitner
