= Lotte Meitner-Graf =

Austrian photographer

- Born: Lotte Graf; 17 November 1899; Austria
- Died: 1973 (aged 73–74); London
- Occupation: Photographer
- Relatives: Lise Meitner (sister-in-law)

Lotte Meitner-Graf (17 November 1899–May 1973, born as Charlotte Graf), was a noted Austrian black-and-white portrait photographer. She was married to physicist Lise Meitner's brother Walter (1891–1961).

== Early life and career ==
Charlotte Graf was born on 17 November 1899 and lived with her family in Vienna. She studied a diploma course in photography at the Graphische Lehr und Versuchsanstalt during World War I. She took further photography training in Munich and Warsaw before returning to Vienna in 1925.

== Photography ==
Graf established her Vienna studio in 1926 and it was soon successful. She employed three trainees (Hermi Friedmann, Elizabeth Back and Olga Seybert). Her studio shared an address with the pottery studio of Lucie Rie. Graf married industrial chemist Walter Meitner in 1926 and became Meitner-Graf. She got her Masters degree in 1930 and was chosen to be portraitist of Alexander Fleming.

Meitner-Graf left her studio and moved to England in 1938 in the context of the Anschluss. She worked in the studio of Georg Fayer, in Mayfair, bringing a network of cultural figures to the client list. One of her colleagues there was Ursula Pariser.

Meitner-Graf opened her own studio at 23 Old Bond Street in London in 1953, next to the studio of Dorothy Wilding. Many of the people she had photographed in Vienna visited her studio in London to have photographs taken having established prominent careers. The studio was on the fifth floor and six people were needed to manoeuvre a baby grand piano across a rooftop so that Meitner-Graf could photograph pianists. She hired Anthony Crickmay as an office assistant and gave him some photographic training.

Even after many photographers were working in colour, Meitner-Graf preferred black-and-white. She declined to put her signature on portraits taken by her assistants and ensured copyright remained with her rather than with customers.

Meitner-Graf is best known for her photographs of notable people including: polymath Albert Schweitzer, musicians Marion Anderson, Otto Klemperer and Yehudi Menuhin; actors John Gielgud and Danny Kaye; scientists Irène Joliot-Curie, Lord Blackett, Lawrence Bragg, Dorothy Hodgkin, and Max Perutz; leaders such as Sālote Tupou III, Jan Smuts, and Mahatma Gandhi; and author Arthur Ransome (whose photograph is in the collection held by the Lakeland Arts Trust). Meitner-Graf's photograph of her sister-in-law, Lise Meitner, was the image used when Meitner became the first woman to appear on a national postage stamp in 1978. Her portraits were widely used in record sleeves, book jackets and magazines.

Meitner-Graf also specialised in photographing artworks for organisations including the British Museum and National Gallery. Her work featured in a Warburg Institute exhibition panel curated by Kenneth Clark, entitled Portrait and Character. The programme for the Festival of the City of London in 1964 featured many of Meitner-Graf's images.

== Family, later life and commemoration ==
In 1930, Meitner-Graf had son, Philip Franz. She photographed him as he played, in rare unposed photographs. In June 1938, the Meitners sent Franz to London. They were able to follow in August, thanks to Thomas Kendrick, Clara Holmes and Betty Hodgson – Kendrick was arrested by the Gestapo shortly after their flight departed. Meitner-Graf later expressed thanks to him by taking his portrait. Her mother, Bertha Graf, left for the UK on the last plane to leave Vienna before World War II broke out. The family rented a house in Putney.

Meitner-Graf died in 1973. In the Times obituary, her nephew Otto Frisch noted that there "can be few educated people who have not seen one of Lotte Meitner-Graf’s photographic portraits, either on a book jacket (for instance, Bertrand Russell’s autobiography, or Antony Hopkins’s Music All Around Me) or on a record sleeve or concert programme."

Malcolm Farrer-Brown established the Lotte Meitner-Graf archive in 2015. Anthony Barrett digitised the archive. Many of her photographs of scientists are also held in the archives of the University of Cambridge.

In 2016, works were exhibited at Dimbola Lodge, former home of Julia Margaret Cameron, curated by Colin Ford who also curated an exhibition of her work for the Garrick Club in 2017. Meitner-Graf's work featured in Another Eye: Women Refugee Photographers in Britain after 1933 at the Four Corners Gallery in 2020, but closed early due to the COVID-19 pandemic.
