= Eva von Bahr (physicist) =

Swedish physicist and docent (1874–1962)

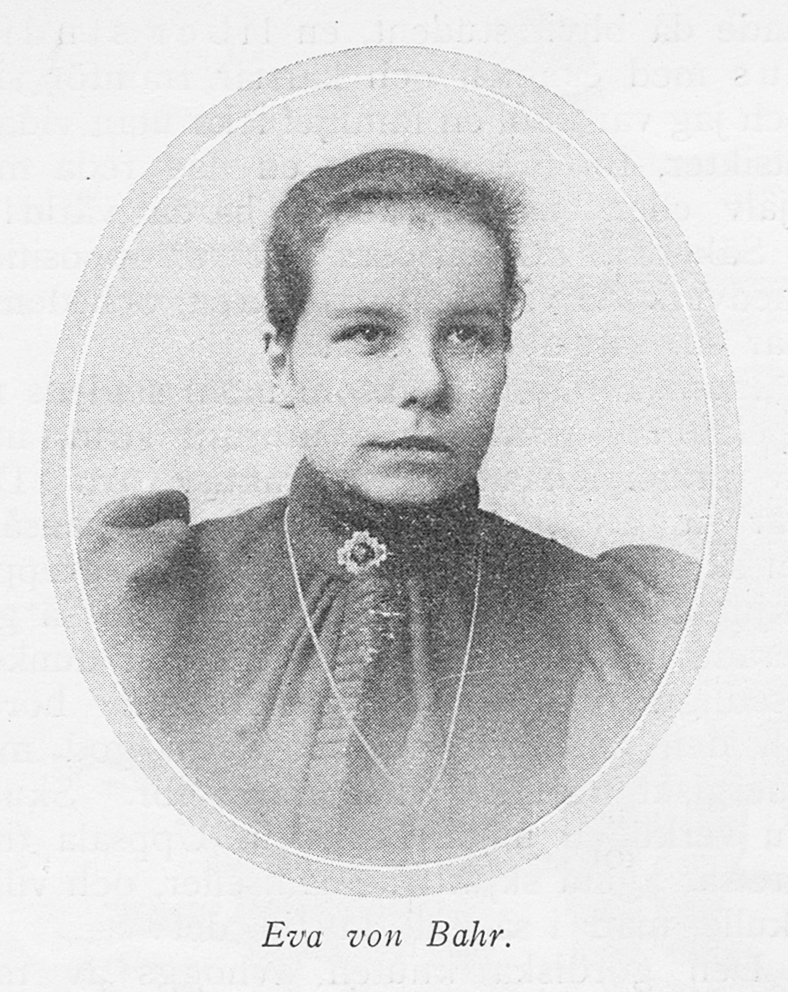
- Born: 16 September 1874; Österåker Municipality, Sweden
- Died: 28 February 1962 (aged 87); Stockholm, Sweden
- Citizenship: Sweden
- Education: Uppsala University
- Known for: First Swedish female docent in physics
- Scientific career
- Fields: Physics
- Workplaces: Uppsala University; Brunnsviks folkhögskola
- Academic advisors: Carl Wilhelm Oseen; Lise Meitner

Eva Wilhelmina Julia von Bahr-Bergius (16 September 1874 – 28 February 1962) was a Swedish physicist and teacher at a folk high school. She was the first woman in Sweden to become a docent in physics. She is known for her contact with and support of the poet Dan Andersson, for her friendship and support of the physicist Lise Meitner, and as a Catholic writer.

== Biography ==
=== Background ===
Eva von Bahr's parents were häradshövding (district judge) Carl von Bahr (1830–1900) and his wife Elisabeth Boström (1838–1914). She was the sister of Johan von Bahr, mayor of Uppsala, and niece of prime minister Erik Gustaf Boström (1842–1907) and philanthropist Ebba Boström (1844–1902), founder of the charitable institution Samariterhemmet in Uppsala. Eva von Bahr was born at Mälby farm in Roslags-Kulla (now in Österåker Municipality).

=== Academic career ===
Despite her family's wishes she wanted an education and studied for a year at the Askov folk high school in Denmark, where Poul la Cour encouraged her interest in physics and mathematics. In 1901, von Bahr matriculated at Uppsala University, in 1907 she passed her licentiate exam and in 1908 she defended her doctoral thesis about infrared radiation absorption in gases. Her thesis was praised and she was given a docent stipend, becoming the first woman physics docent in Sweden.

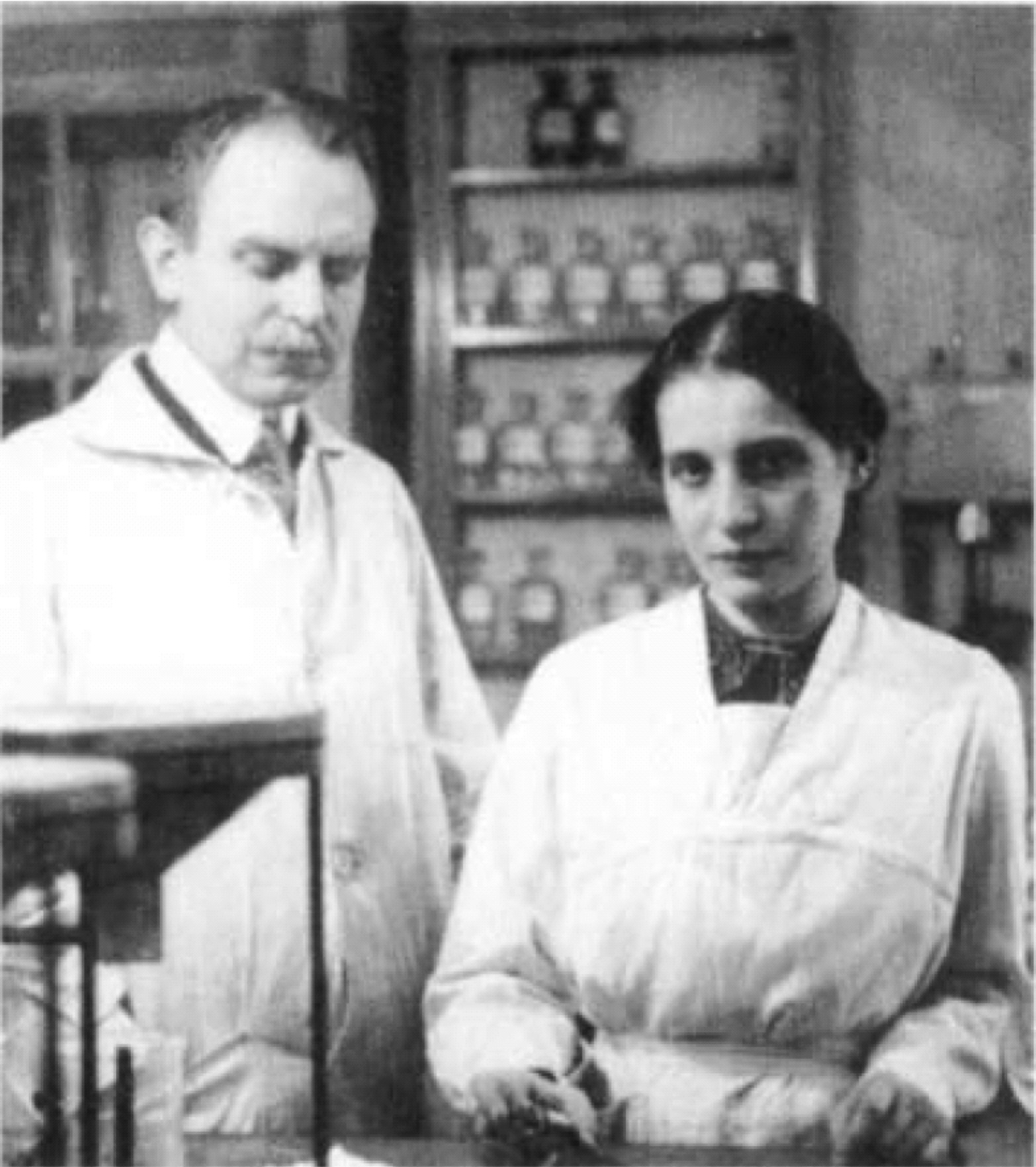
Lise Meitner with her research colleague Otto Hahn in 1912, the same year that Meitner and von Bahr met for the first time

Starting in 1909 she worked as a docent at the Physics department in Uppsala with the support of professor Knut Ångström. But following Ångström's sudden death in 1910, von Bahr was not allowed to teach, except as a temp. Only after 1925 were women allowed to work at universities in Sweden. In 1912, after being stopped from being a professor in Uppsala and at Chalmers tekniska läroanstalt because she was a woman, von Bahr applied for a position at University of Berlin. The institution had number of outstanding physicists, among them Albert Einstein, Max Planck, Max von Laue, Walther Nernst, Fritz Haber, Lise Meitner, James Franck and Gustav Hertz. Von Bahr developed a close friendship with Lise Meitner.

After her visit to Berlin, von Bahr exchanged letters with Meitner; she also had close contact with the mathematician and theoretical physicist Carl Wilhelm Oseen in Uppsala. In January 1913, von Bahr again travelled to Berlin, where she worked under professor Heinrich Rubens. During her time there, von Bahr conducted experiments that supported Max Planck's theories, which made her the only Swedish physicist to be mentioned by Niels Bohr during his Nobel lecture in 1922. During that spring, von Bahr was invited to work with James Franck and Gustav Hertz, and joined their group that autumn.

=== Return to Sweden ===
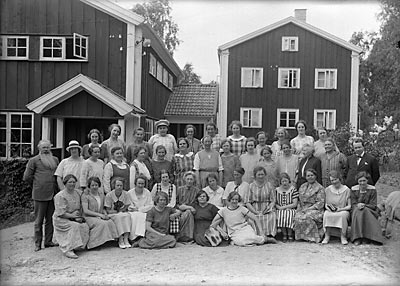
A class at Brunnsviks folkhögskola sometime in the 1930

At the beginning of January 1914, von Bahr had to cut short her time in Berlin to care for her ill mother. The year after she planned to return to Berlin, but due to the outbreak of World War I that was not possible, so she took a position as teacher at Brunnsvik folk high school in Dalarna. At Brunnsvik, she met Niklas Bergius (1871-1947), a fellow teacher, whom she married on 19 June 1917. In the autumn of 1918, food was scarce in Sweden due to the war and the school was closed, so the couple travelled to Charlottenlund in Denmark where they met with Jesuits. This period in Denmark awakened von Bahr's interest in Catholicism, before that she had been an atheist.

After the end of World War I, Lise Meitner visited von Bahr in Sweden and stayed in her home for four weeks. In the winter of 1919–1920, von Bahr traveled to London, Pau, Algiers, Tunis, and Italy.

After some years, she moved to Kungälv in order to be closer to the Catholic congregation in Gothenburg. When Lise Meitner's situation in Germany became dangerous during the summer of 1938 von Bahr, together with Wilhelm Oseen and Niels Bohr, was very active in helping her to escape and to arrange for her stay in Sweden and a research position.

While in Sweden in December 1938, Lise Meitner and Otto Robert Frisch managed to theorize nuclear fission.

After the outbreak of World War II and the German occupation of Norway, von Bahr was active in the Swedish humanitarian organization Svenska Norgehjälpen (Swedish Support of Norway).

Eva von Bahr was also a philanthropist, and for some time she supported among others Lise Meitner and the poet Dan Andersson. She also contributed funds to Brunnsviks Folkhögskola and donated the house in Kungälv that she had built. After her husband's death in 1947 von Bahr moved to Uppsala. During her time in Uppsala she was interested in the Jesuit priest and writer Pierre Teilhard de Chardin and she kept contact and mail exchange with Lise Meitner. Eva von Bahr died on 28 February 1962 and was buried at the Catholic cemetery in Stockholm.

== Works ==
- von Bahr, Eva (1910). "Ueber die Einwirkung des Druckes auf die Absorption ultraroter Strahlung durch Gase". Annalen der Physik. 338 (13): 585–597. Bibcode:1910AnP...338..585V. doi:10.1002/andp.19103381307.
- Om katolicismen: några ord till protestanter [About Catholicism: a few words to protestants] (in Swedish). Almqvist & Wiksell. 1929. OCLC 185680657.
- Bahr-Bergius, Eva von (1933). Min väg tillbaka till kristendomen [My way back to Christianity] (in Swedish). Almqvist & Wiksell. OCLC 185680110.
- Bahr, Eva von (1934). Efterskrift till Min väg tillbaka till kristendomen (in Swedish). Almqvist.
- "Ur "spridda minnen från ett långt liv"" [From "Some Reminiscences of a Long Life"]. Acta Universitatis Upsaliensis: Skrifter rörande Uppsala universitet. Inbjudningar. B [Journal of the University of Uppsala: Writings concerning Uppsala University. Invitations. B]. 177. Uppsala University: 7–73. 2015.
