= Anthony Crickmay =

British dance photographer (1937–2020)

Anthony John Crickmay (20 May 1937 – 8 January 2020) was a British dance photographer.

Crickmay was born in Dorking, Surrey, England. He was known for having taken photographs of Rudolf Nureyev and Darcey Bussell. A self-taught photographer, he began his career as an assistant to Lotte Meitner-Graf, and then set up his own studio in 1958.
