= Selma Freud =

Austrian physicist (1877-1933)

Selma Freud (b., 21 August 1877, Vienna, d. after 1933, probably in Israel) was an Austrian physicist and the founder of the first official Salvation Army corps in Vienna. She received her doctorate in physics from the University of Vienna in 1906 and was widely thought to be the first Austrian woman to do so, although she was in fact the second. There is no record of Freud pursuing physics research beyond her dissertation. Instead, having been raised Protestant in a largely Catholic country, Freud trained with the Salvation Army in London in the early 1920s and in 1926 founded the first Austrian chapter of the Heilsarmee (the Army's German name) in Vienna in the face of local opposition there.

== Life ==
=== Childhood ===
Selma Freud was the daughter of a Viennese manufacturer, Simon Siegmund Freud, who operated a factory at Amerlingstrasse 19, Mariahilf, in Vienna's 6th district and who later owned a house (where Selma may have lived) at Hugo-Wolf-Gasse 1 on a corner of Loquaiplatz. She attended elementary school in Vienna and then an all-girls Lyzeum run by the Vienna Women's Employment Association (Frauenerwerbsverein). She then went to Prague to take the Matura (high school graduation exam), as women at the time were not allowed to take it in Austria.

=== University and graduate school ===
The University of Vienna had begun admitting women in 1897, and Freud began her studies there in 1901, majoring in physics and minoring in mathematics. Her professors included the renowned physicists Franz Exner and Ludwig Boltzmann. Freud submitted her doctoral dissertation—"On the Influence of Temperature on the Photoelectric Sensitivity of a Negatively Charged Conductor"—in 1905 and passed her oral examinations that November. Professors Exner and Boltzmann approved her dissertation, and she was awarded her doctorate the following 1 February. Although Freud was thought for some time to have been the first woman to receive a doctorate from the University of Vienna, Olga Steindler (1879–1933) had already achieved that in 1903. Freud's fellow physics student and later renowned physicist Lise Meitner also received her doctorate on the same day as Freud. Freud's research on physics after graduation remains unknown, as the curriculum vitae originally attached to her handwritten dissertation was lost and no further records can be found. Austrian physicist Karl Przibram, discussing Meitner, later recalled, "Another physicist, Selma Freud, graduated with [Meitner] and worked in the same room as her on Türkenstraße, but apparently did no more scientific work."

=== The Heilsarmee (Salvation Army) ===
Freud appears again in the historical record only in the 1920s, when she trained at Salvation Army headquarters in London. Women and men were treated equally in the London office, and Freud trained there as an officer (captain). In 1926, facing opposition from the local population and (Catholic) churches in Vienna, she established the first Heilsarmee outpost in Vienna—a "corps"—and held unofficial meetings. In May 1927, work was begun on the chapter's own building, and Salvation Army Lieutenant Commissioner Bruno Friedrich later presided over its opening, with Captain Lydia Saak the officer-in-charge. Also in 1927, at a meeting of the Vienna Evangelical Alliance, Freud presented a paper outlining her ideas about "the united front of the evangelical Christian communities with respect to the outside world" in which she discussed the Heilsarmee's "behavior towards Pentecostals, Adventists, [and] Bible students, whether they can be brought in later." Thus, was Freud considering a tremendous expansion of the participants in the Evangelical Alliance that would only occur half a century later, simultaneous to the founding of the Free Church in Austria, and then only including the Pentecostals.

Freud continued to hold prayer and thanksgiving meetings and in 1928 also created a monthly official organ of the Salvation Army in Austria, "The War Cry" (Kriegsanruf), serving as editor from the first issue (July 1928) until May 1938, when Adolf Kossuth assumed the role. Freud also published several of her own articles in the Kriegsanruf. At the end of a trip report published on 27 September 1933, for example, she wrote. "In the next issue, my friends and comrades, I hope, God willing, to already be reporting on our healing work in the Holy Land." Whether Freud participated in the founding of another corps in Palestine or Jerusalem is not known.

== Publications ==
- About the influence of temperature on the photoelectric sensitivity of a negatively charged conductor. (Über den Einfluss der Temperatur auf die lichtelektrische Empfindlichkeit eines negativ geladenen Conductors). Dissertation, University of Vienna, 1905
