= Ruth Lewin Sime =

American author, educator and scientific researcher

- Born: 2 July 1939
- Occupation: Educator

Ruth Lewin Sime is an American author, educator and scientific researcher, best known for publishing works on history of science. She has written several books and articles concerning nuclear physicist Lise Meitner and radiochemist Otto Hahn, who were both involved in the discovery and explanation of nuclear fission.

Sime is a professor emerita in the Department of Chemistry at Sacramento City College.

== Early life ==
Sime graduated from Barnard College in 1960 and received a Ph.D. from Harvard University in 1964.
