= Meitner (Venusian crater) =

Crater on Venus

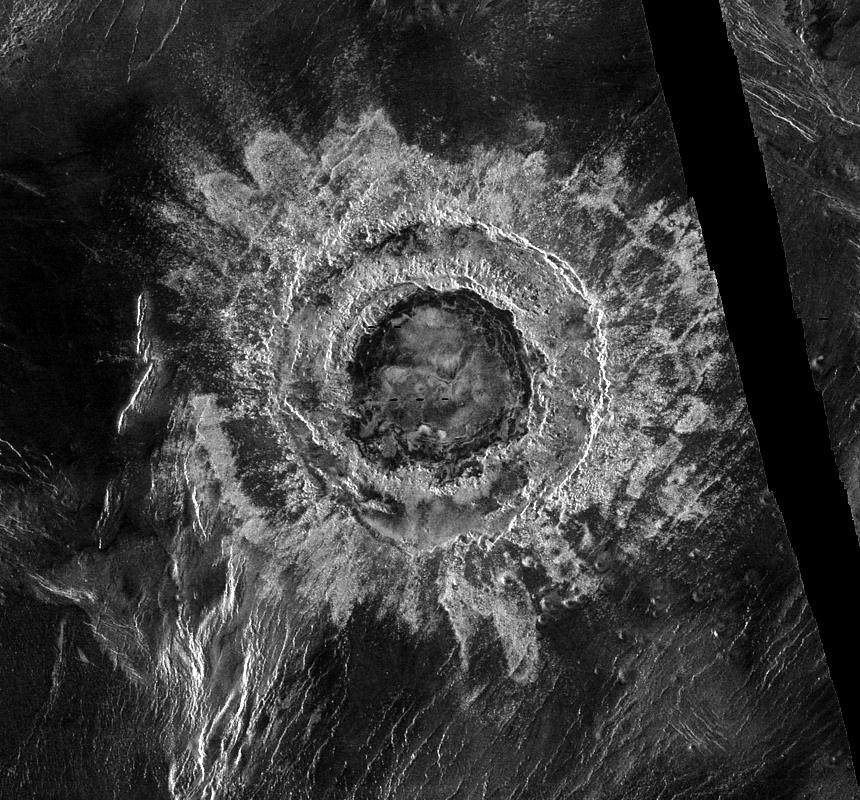
- Radar map of Meitner crater (black band indicates lack of data)
- Location: Venus
- Coordinates: 55.6°S 321.6°E
- Diameter: 149 km (93 mi)
- Eponym: Lise Meitner

Meitner is a multiring impact crater on Venus. This crater was named in 1979 after the female Austrian-Swedish physicist, Lise Meitner, in her honour.

Meitner is a peak ring crater.
