= Lise Meitner =

Austrian-Swedish nuclear physicist (1878–1968)

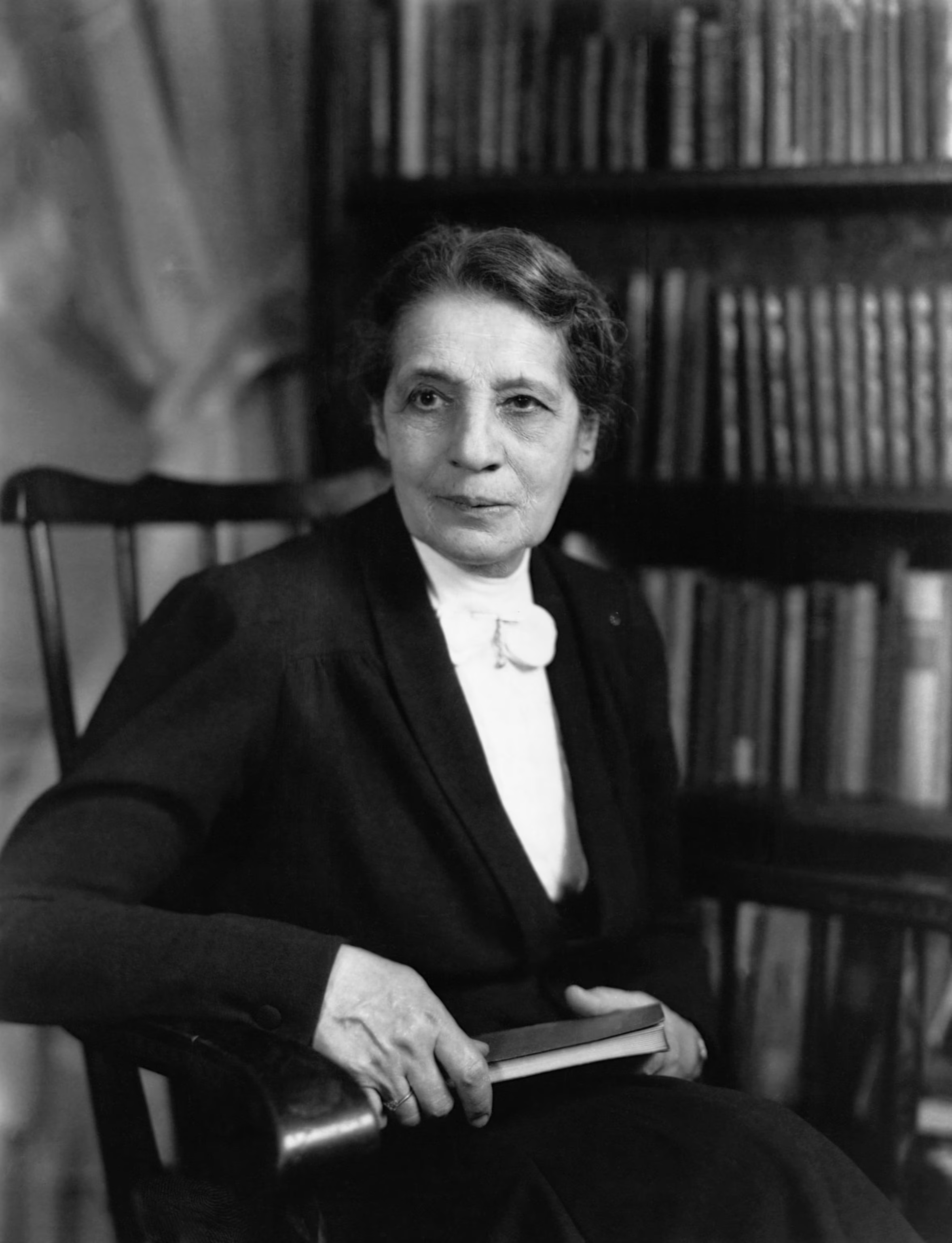
- Meitner, c. 1960
- Born: Elise Meitner; 7 November 1878; Vienna, Austria-Hungary
- Died: 27 October 1968 (aged 89); Cambridge, England
- Resting place: St James' Church, Bramley, England
- Citizenship: Austria (until 1938); Stateless (1938–49); Sweden (from 1949)
- Education: University of Vienna (Dr. phil.); University of Berlin (Dr. habil.)
- Known for: Contributing to the discovery of protactinium (1917–18); Independently discovering the Auger effect (1922); Contributing to the discovery of nuclear fission (1934–38)
- Father: Philipp Meitner
- Relatives: Otto Frisch (nephew)
- Awards: Lieben Prize (1925); Max Planck Medal (1949); ForMemRS (1955); Otto Hahn Prize (1955); Pour le Mérite for Sciences and Arts (1957); Wilhelm Exner Medal (1960); Enrico Fermi Award (1966); Austrian Decoration for Science and Art (1967)
- Scientific career
- Fields: Nuclear physics
- Workplaces: Kaiser Wilhelm Institute for Chemistry (1912–38); University of Berlin (1923–33); KTH Royal Institute of Technology (1947–60)
- Thesis: Wärmeleitung in inhomogenen Körpern (Heat conduction in inhomogeneous bodies) (1906)
- Doctoral advisors: Hans Benndorf; Franz S. Exner
- Other academic advisors: Ludwig Boltzmann; Max Planck
- Doctoral students: Nikolaus Riehl (1929); Wang Ganchang (1934); Arnold Flammersfeld (1938)
- Other notable students: Max Delbrück; Maurice Goldhaber; Herwig Schopper

Elise "Lise" Meitner (/ˈmaɪtnər/ MYTE-ner; German: [ˈliːzə ˈmaɪtnɐ]; 7 November 1878 – 27 October 1968) was an Austrian and Swedish nuclear physicist who was instrumental in the discovery of nuclear fission.

After completing her doctoral research in 1906, Meitner became the second woman to earn a doctorate in physics from the University of Vienna. She spent much of her scientific career in Berlin, where she was a physics professor and a department head at the Kaiser Wilhelm Institute for Chemistry. She was the first woman to become a full professor of physics in Germany. She lost her positions in 1935 because of the anti-Jewish Nuremberg Laws of Nazi Germany, as well as her citizenship after the 1938 annexation of Austria by Germany. On 13–14 July 1938, she fled to the Netherlands with the help of Dirk Coster. She lived in Stockholm for many years, ultimately becoming a Swedish citizen in 1949, while insisting on keeping her Austrian citizenship, but relocated to Britain in the 1950s to be with family members.

In mid-1938, chemists Otto Hahn and Fritz Strassmann at the Kaiser Wilhelm Institute for Chemistry demonstrated that isotopes of barium could be formed by neutron bombardment of uranium. Meitner was informed of their findings by Hahn, and in late December, with her nephew, fellow physicist Otto Robert Frisch, she worked out the physics of this process by correctly interpreting Hahn and Strassmann's experimental data. On 13 January 1939, Frisch replicated the process Hahn and Strassmann had observed. In Meitner and Frisch's report in the February 1939 issue of Nature, they gave the process the name "fission". The discovery of nuclear fission led to the development of nuclear reactors and atomic bombs during World War II.

Meitner did not share the 1944 Nobel Prize in Chemistry for nuclear fission, which was awarded to her long-time collaborator Otto Hahn. Several scientists and journalists have called her exclusion "unjust". According to the Nobel Prize archive, she was nominated 19 times for the Nobel Prize in Chemistry between 1924 and 1948, and 30 times for the Nobel Prize in Physics between 1937 and 1967. Despite not having been awarded the Nobel Prize, Meitner was invited to attend the Lindau Nobel Laureate Meeting in 1962. She received many other honours, including the posthumous naming of element 109 meitnerium in 1997.

== Early years ==
Elise Meitner was born in November 1878 into a Jewish upper-middle-class family at the family home in 27 Kaiser Josefstraße in the Leopoldstadt district of Vienna. She was the third of eight children of chess master Philipp Meitner and his wife Hedwig. The birth register of Vienna's Jewish community lists her as being born on 17 November 1878, but all other documents list her date of birth as 7 November, which is what she used.

Her father was one of the first Jewish lawyers admitted to practice in Austria. She had two older siblings, Gisela and Auguste (Gusti), and four younger: Moriz (Fritz), Carola (Lola), Frida and Walter; all ultimately pursued an advanced education. Her father was a freethinker, and she was brought up as such.

As an adult, she converted to Christianity, following Lutheranism, and was baptised in 1908; her sisters Gisela and Lola converted to Catholicism that same year. She also adopted the shortened name "Lise".

== Education ==
Meitner's interest in science began when she was eight, when she kept a notebook of her scientific research under her pillow. She was drawn to mathematics and science, and studied the colours of an oil slick, thin films, and reflected light. The only career available to women was teaching, so she attended a high school for girls where she trained as a French teacher. As well as French, her education included bookkeeping, arithmetic, history, geography, science and gymnastics. She completed high school in 1892.

Women were not allowed to attend public institutions of higher education in Vienna until 1897, but when this restriction was lifted, the requirement for a gymnasium education was waived and women only needed to pass the matura, the secondary school leaving qualification required for university entrance. Her sister Gisela passed the matura and entered medical school in 1900. Meitner began taking private lessons with two other young women in 1899, cramming the missing years of secondary education into two. Physics was taught by Arthur Szarvasy.

In July 1901, they sat an external matura examination at the Akademisches Gymnasium. Four out of the fourteen women passed, including Meitner and Henriette Boltzmann, the daughter of physicist Ludwig Boltzmann.

== Research, work and academia ==
=== University of Vienna ===
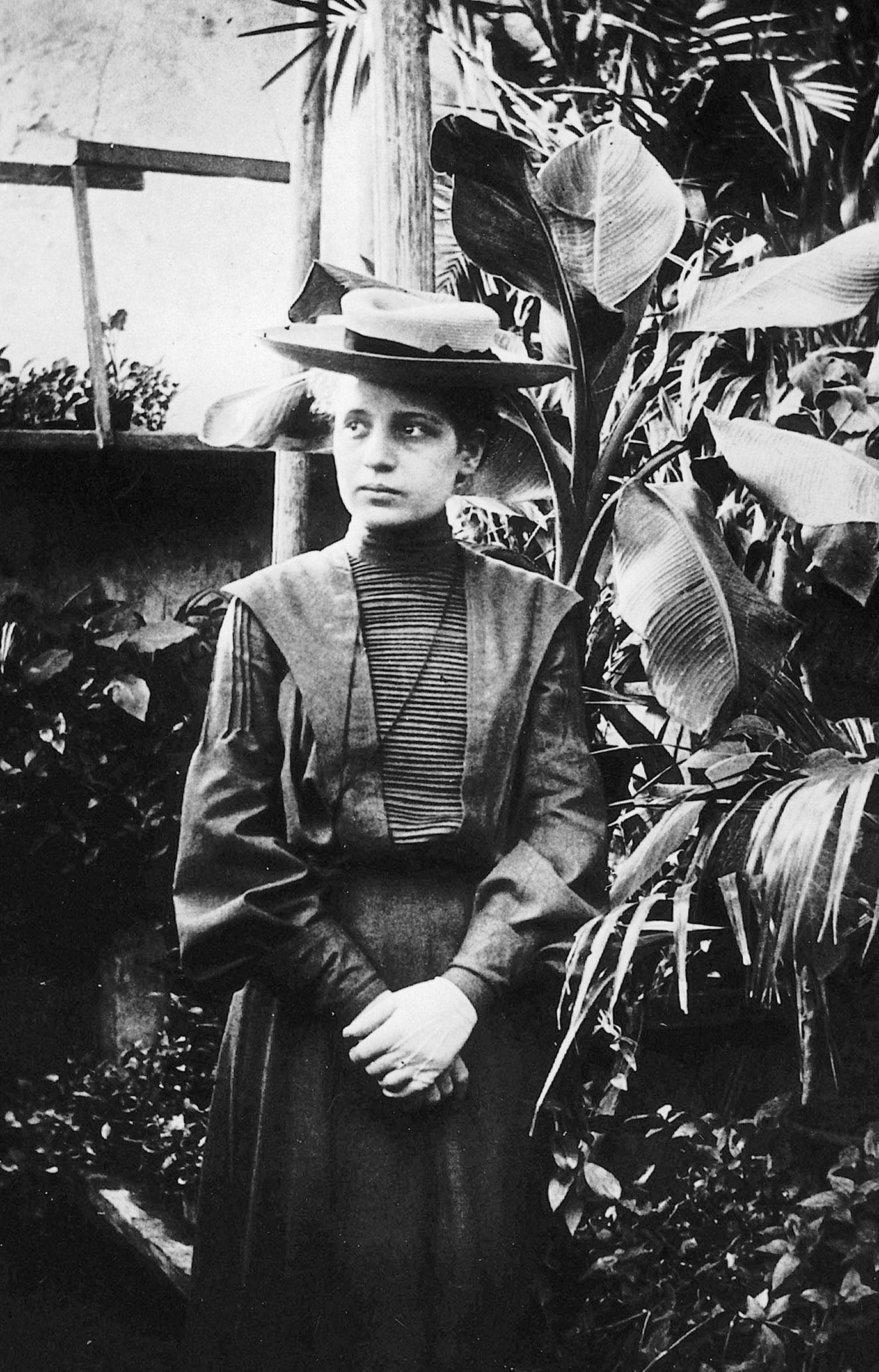
Meitner in 1906

Meitner entered the University of Vienna in October 1901. She was particularly inspired by Ludwig Boltzmann and often spoke with enthusiasm about his lectures. Her dissertation was supervised by Franz Exner and his assistant Hans Benndorf. Her thesis was submitted on 20 November 1905 and approved on 28 November. She passed an oral exam from Exner and Boltzmann on 19 December, and was awarded her doctorate on 1 February 1906. She became the second woman to earn a doctoral degree in physics at the University of Vienna, after Olga Steindler who had received her degree in 1903; the third was Selma Freud, who worked in the same laboratory as Meitner, and received hers in 1906. Meitner's thesis was published as Wärmeleitung in inhomogenen Körpern ('Thermal Conduction in Inhomogeneous Bodies') on 22 February 1906.

Paul Ehrenfest asked her to investigate an article on optics by Lord Rayleigh detailing an experiment that produced results Rayleigh had been unable to explain. She was able to explain the results, and also made predictions based on her explanation, which she then verified experimentally, demonstrating her ability to carry out independent and unsupervised research. She published the results in her report on "Some Conclusions Derived from the Fresnel Reflection Formula". In 1906, while engaged in this research, Meitner was introduced by Stefan Meyer to radioactivity, then a very new field of study. She started with alpha particles. In her experiments with collimators and metal foil, she found that scattering in a beam of alpha particles increased with the mass of the metal atoms. She submitted her findings to the Physikalische Zeitschrift on 29 June 1907. This was one of the experiments that led Ernest Rutherford to predict the nuclear atom.

=== Friedrich Wilhelm University ===
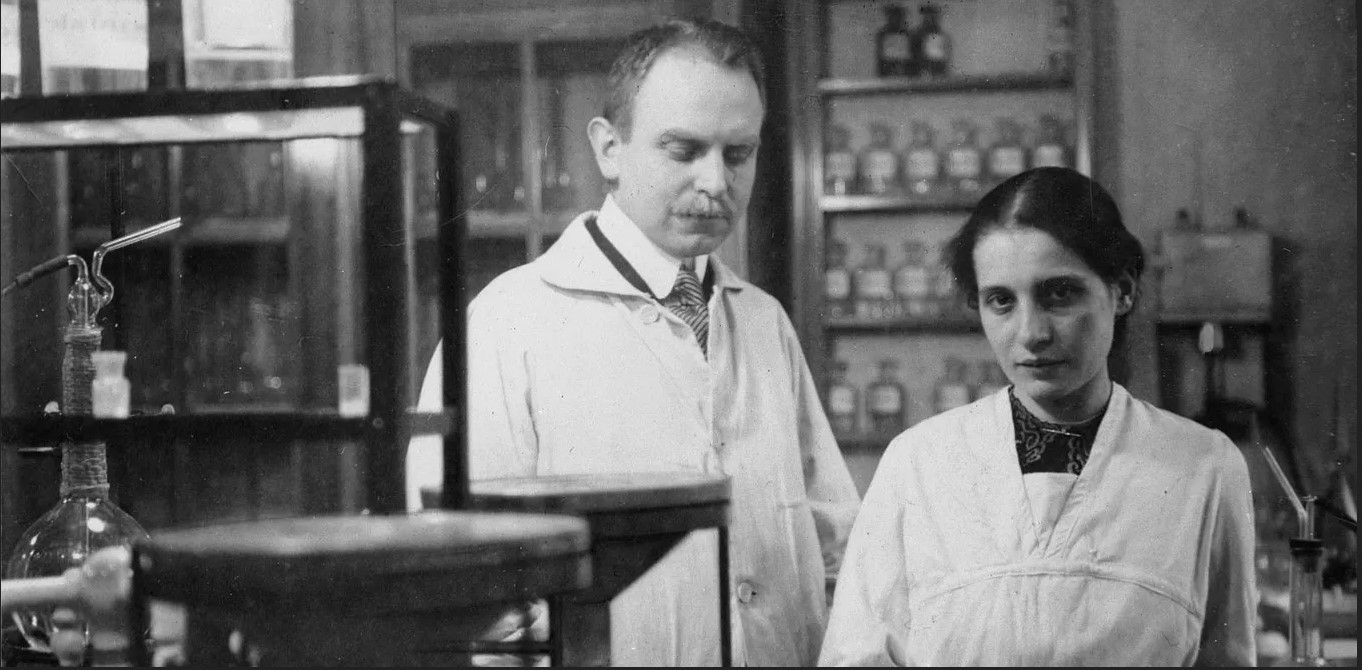
Lise Meitner and Otto Hahn in 1912

Encouraged and backed by her father's financial support, Meitner entered the Friedrich Wilhelm University in Berlin, where the renowned physicist Max Planck taught. Planck invited her to his home, and allowed her to attend his lectures. This was an unusual gesture by Planck, who was on record as opposing the admission of women to universities in general, but apparently recognised Meitner as an exception. She became friends with Planck's twin daughters Emma and Grete, who were born in 1889, and shared Meitner's love of music.

Attending Planck's lectures did not take up all her time, and Meitner approached Heinrich Rubens, the head of the experimental physics institute, about doing some research. Rubens said that he would be happy for her to work in his laboratory. He also added that Otto Hahn at the chemistry institute was looking for a physicist to collaborate with. A few minutes later she was introduced to Hahn. He had studied radioactive substances under William Ramsay and Ernest Rutherford, and was already credited with the discovery of what were then thought to be several new radioactive elements. (Note: In fact, they were isotopes of known elements, but the concept of an isotope, along with the term, was only propounded by Frederick Soddy in 1913.) Hahn was the same age as Meitner, and she noted his informal and approachable manner. In Montreal, Hahn had become accustomed to collaboration with physicists—including at least one woman, Harriet Brooks.

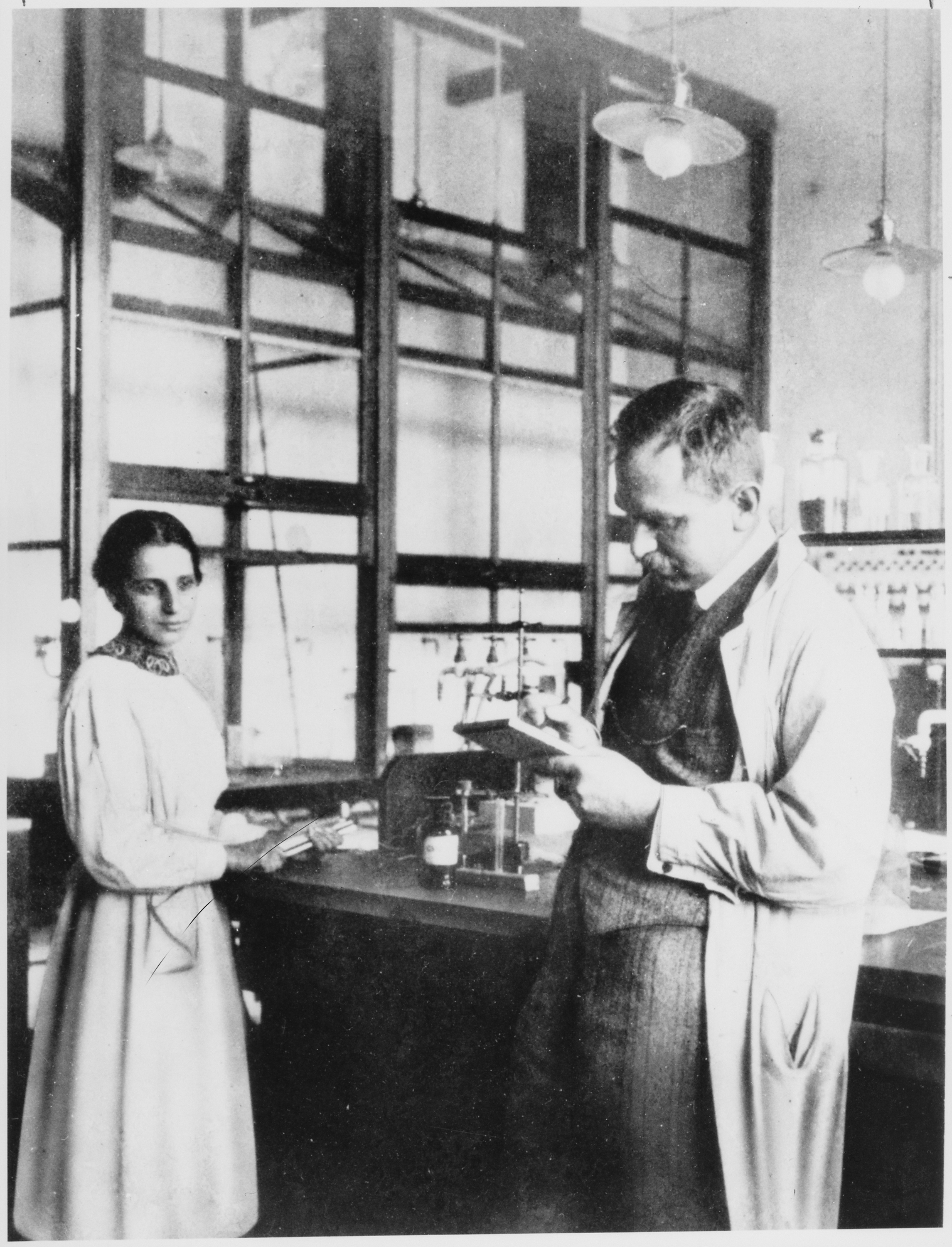
Meitner and Hahn in their laboratory, in 1913. When a colleague she did not recognise said that they had met before, Meitner replied: "You probably mistake me for Professor Hahn."

The head of the chemistry institute, Emil Fischer, placed a former woodworking shop (Holzwerkstatt) at Hahn's disposal in the basement to use as a laboratory. Hahn equipped it with electroscopes to measure alpha and beta particles and gamma rays. It was not possible to conduct research in the wood shop, but Alfred Stock, the head of the inorganic chemistry department, let Hahn use a space in one of his two private laboratories. Like Meitner, Hahn was unpaid, and lived off an allowance from his father, although somewhat larger than hers. He completed his habilitation in early 1907, and became a Privatdozent. Most of the organic chemists at the chemistry institute did not regard Hahn's work—detecting minute traces of isotopes too small to see, weigh or smell through their radioactivity—as real chemistry. One department head remarked that "it is incredible what one gets to be a Privatdozent these days!" Lise Meitner helped discover the radioactive element protactinium.

The arrangement was difficult for Meitner at first. Women were not yet admitted to universities in the German state of the Kingdom of Prussia, which included Berlin. Meitner was allowed to work in the wood shop, which had its own external entrance, but she could not enter the rest of the institute, including Hahn's laboratory space upstairs. If she wanted to go to the toilet, she had to use one at the restaurant down the street. The following year, women were admitted to Prussian universities, and Fischer lifted the restrictions, and had women's toilets installed in the building. Not all the chemists were happy about this. The Institute of Physics was more accepting, and she became friends with the physicists there, including Otto von Baeyer, James Franck, Gustav Hertz, Robert Pohl, Max Planck, Peter Pringsheim and Wilhelm Westphal.

During the first years Meitner worked with Hahn, they co-authored nine papers: three in 1908 and six in 1909. Together with Hahn, she discovered and developed a physical separation method known as radioactive recoil, in which a daughter nucleus is forcefully ejected as it recoils at the moment of decay. While Hahn was more concerned with discovering new elements (now known to be isotopes), Meitner was more interested in understanding their radiation. She observed that radioactive recoil, which had been discovered by Harriet Brooks in 1904, could be a new way of detecting radioactive substances. They soon discovered two more new isotopes, bismuth-211 and thallium-207. Meitner was particularly interested in beta particles. By this time, they were known to be electrons. Alpha particles were emitted with characteristic energy, and she expected that this would be true of beta particles too. Hahn and Meitner carefully measured the absorption of beta particles by aluminium, but the results were puzzling. In 1914, James Chadwick found that electrons emitted from the nucleus formed a continuous spectrum, but Meitner found this hard to believe, as it seemed to contradict quantum physics, which held that electrons in an atom can only occupy discrete energy states (quanta).

=== Kaiser Wilhelm Institute for Chemistry ===
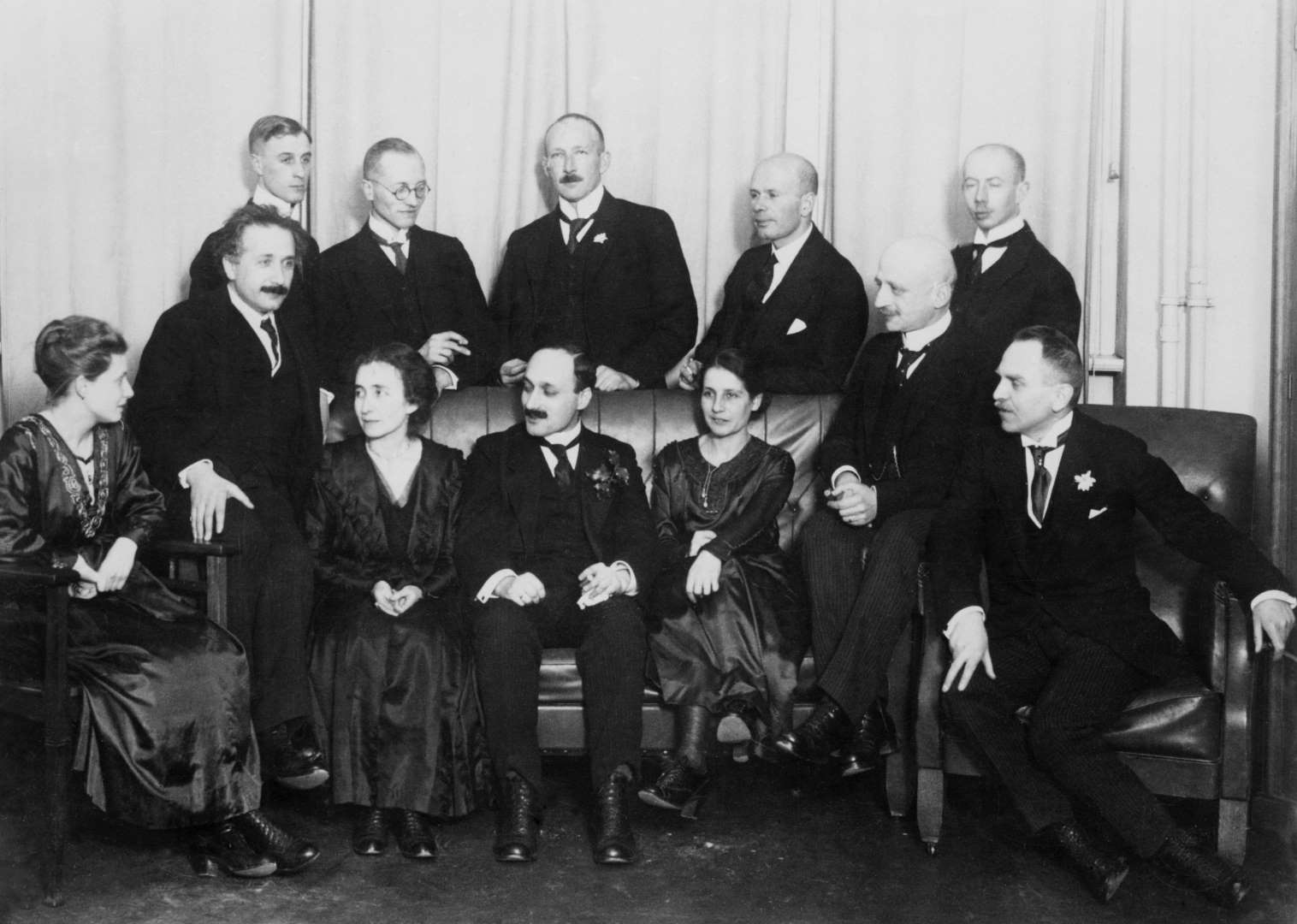
Physicists and chemists in Berlin in 1920. Front row, left to right: Hertha Sponer, Albert Einstein, Ingrid Franck, James Franck, Lise Meitner, Fritz Haber, and Otto Hahn. Back row, left to right: Walter Grotrian, Wilhelm Westphal, Otto von Baeyer, Peter Pringsheim and Gustav Hertz

In 1912, Hahn and Meitner moved to the newly founded Kaiser Wilhelm Institute (KWI) for Chemistry in Berlin. Hahn accepted an offer from Fischer to become a junior assistant in charge of its radiochemistry section, the first laboratory of its kind in Germany. The job came with the title of "professor" and a salary of 5,000 marks per annum (equivalent to €29,000 in 2021). Unlike the universities, the privately funded KWI had no policies excluding women, but Meitner worked without pay as a "guest" in Hahn's section. She may have encountered financial difficulties after the death of her father in 1910. Fearing she might return to Vienna, Planck appointed her as his assistant at the Institute for Theoretical Physics in the Friedrich Wilhelm University. As such, she marked his students' papers. It was her first paid position. Assistant was the lowest rung on the academic ladder, and Meitner was the first female scientific assistant in Prussia.

Proud officials presented Meitner to Kaiser Wilhelm II at the official opening of the KWI for Chemistry on 23 October 1912. The following year she became a Mitglied ('associate') like Hahn (although her salary was still less), and the radioactivity section became the Hahn-Meitner Laboratory. Meitner celebrated with a dinner party at the Hotel Adlon. Hahn and Meitner's salaries would soon be dwarfed by royalties from mesothorium ("middle thorium", radium-228, also called "German radium") produced for medical purposes, for which Hahn received 66,000 marks in 1914 (equivalent to €369,000 in 2021). He gave ten per cent to Meitner. In 1914, Meitner was offered an academic position in Prague, which was then part of her country of Austria-Hungary. Planck made it clear to Fischer that he did not want Meitner to leave, and Fischer arranged for her salary to be doubled to 3,000 marks (equivalent to €17,000 in 2021).

The move to new accommodation was fortunate, as the wood shop had become thoroughly contaminated by radioactive liquids that had been spilt, and radioactive gases that had vented and decayed then settled as radioactive dust, making sensitive measurements impossible. To ensure that their clean new laboratories stayed that way, Hahn and Meitner instituted strict procedures. Chemical and physical measurements were conducted in different rooms, people handling radioactive substances had to follow protocols that included not shaking hands, and rolls of toilet paper were hung next to every telephone and door handle. Strongly radioactive substances were stored in the old wood shop, and later in a purpose-built radium house on the institute grounds.

== World War I and the discovery of protactinium ==
In July 1914—shortly before the outbreak of World War I—Hahn was called to active duty with the army in a Landwehr regiment. Meitner undertook X-ray technician training, and a course on anatomy at the city hospital in Lichterfelde. Meanwhile, she completed both the work on the beta ray spectrum that she had begun before the war with Hahn and Baeyer, and her own study of the uranium decay chain. In July 1915, she returned to Vienna, where she joined the Austrian Army as an X-ray nurse-technician. Her unit was deployed to the Eastern front in Poland, and she also served on the Italian front before being discharged in September 1916.

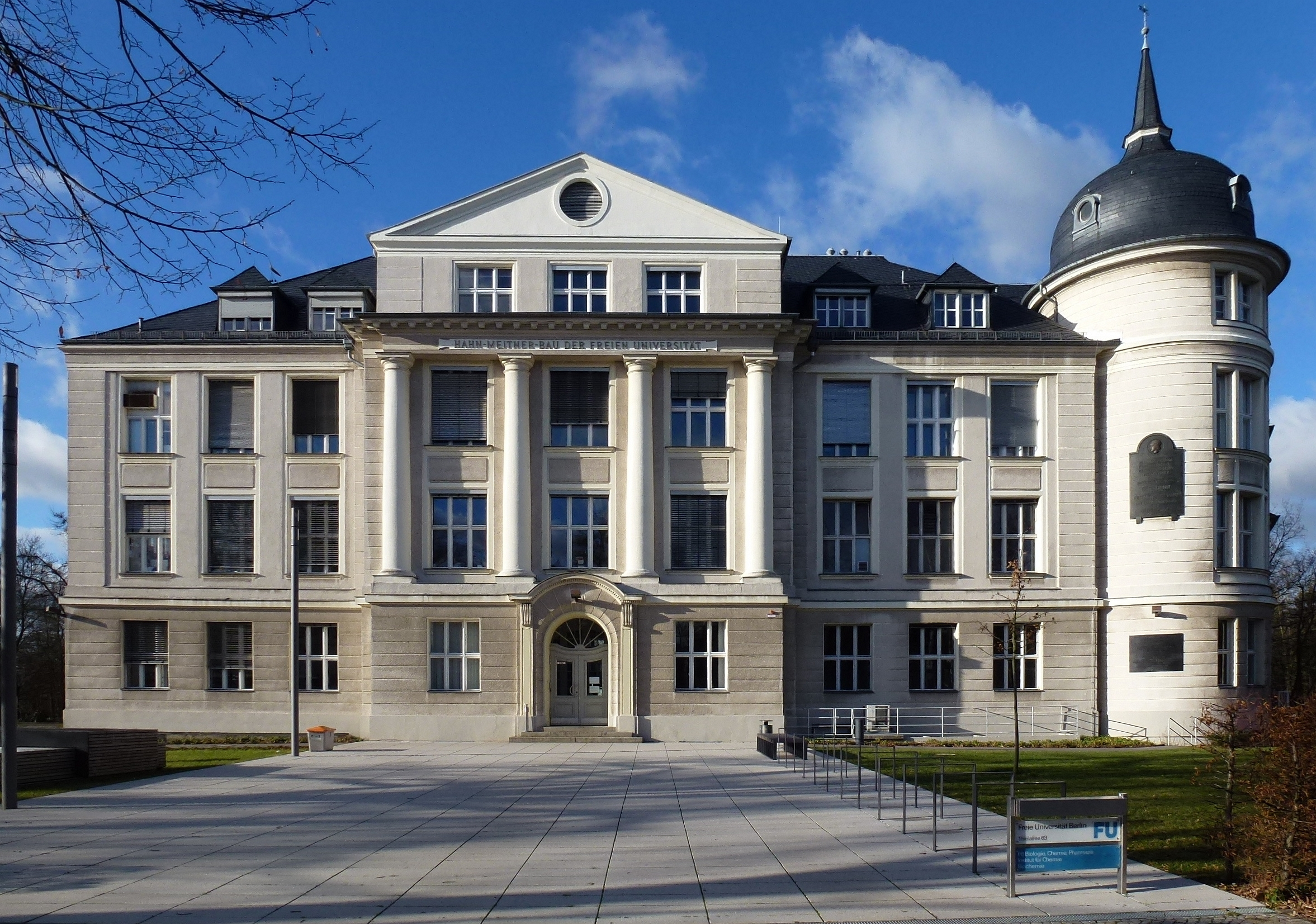
Former Kaiser Wilhelm Institute for Chemistry building in Berlin. Badly damaged by bombing during World War II, it was restored and became part of the Free University of Berlin in 1948. It was renamed the Otto Hahn Building in 1956, and the Hahn-Meitner Building in 2010.

Meitner returned to the KWI for Chemistry and her research in October. In January 1917, she was appointed as head of her own physics section. The Hahn-Meitner Laboratory was divided into separate Hahn and Meitner Laboratories, and her pay was increased to 4,000 marks (equivalent to €10,000 in 2021). Hahn returned to Berlin on leave, and they discussed another loose end from their pre-war work: the search for the mother isotope of actinium (element 89). According to the radioactive displacement law of Fajans and Soddy, this had to be an isotope of the undiscovered element 91 on the periodic table that lay between thorium (element 90) and uranium (element 92). Kasimir Fajans and Oswald Helmuth Göhring discovered the missing element in 1913, and named it brevium after its short half-life. However, the isotope they had found was a beta emitter, and therefore could not be the mother isotope of actinium. This had to be another isotope of the same element.

In 1914, Hahn and Meitner had developed a new technique for separating the tantalum group from pitchblende, which they hoped would speed the isolation of the new isotope. When Meitner resumed this work in 1917, Hahn and most of the students, laboratory assistants and technicians had been called up to serve in the armed forces, so Meitner had to do everything herself. In February, she extracted 2 grams of silicon dioxide (SiO_{2}) from 21 grams of pitchblende. She set 1.5 grams aside and added a tantalum pentafluoride (TaF_{5}) carrier to the other 0.5 grams, which she dissolved in hydrogen fluoride (HF). She then boiled it in concentrated sulfuric acid (H_{2}SO_{4}), precipitated what was believed to be element 91, and verified that it was an alpha emitter. Hahn came home on leave in April, and together they devised a series of tests to eliminate other sources of alpha particles. The only known ones with similar chemical behaviour were lead-210 (which decays to alpha emitter polonium-210 via bismuth-210) and thorium-230.

Further investigation required more pitchblende. Meitner went to Vienna, where she met with Stefan Meyer. The export of uranium from Austria was forbidden due to wartime restrictions, but Meyer was able to offer her a kilogram of uranium residue, pitchblende from which the uranium had been removed, which was actually better for her purpose. The tests showed that the alpha activity was not due to these substances. All that now remained was to find evidence of actinium. For this yet more pitchblende was required, but this time Meyer was unable to assist, as the export was now prohibited. Meitner managed to obtain 100 grams of "double residue"—pitchblende without uranium or radium—from Friedrich Oskar Giesel and began tests with 43 grams of it, but its composition was different, and at first her tests did not work. With Giesel's help, she was able to produce a pure product that was strongly radioactive. By December 1917 she was able to isolate both the mother isotope and its actinium daughter product. She submitted their findings for publication in March 1918.

Although Fajans and Göhring had been the first to discover the element, custom required that an element was represented by its longest-lived and most abundant isotope, and brevium did not seem appropriate. Fajans agreed to Meitner naming the element "protoactinium" (subsequently shortened to protactinium), and assigning it the chemical symbol Pa. In June 1918, Soddy and John Cranston announced that they had independently extracted a sample of the isotope, but unlike Meitner they were unable to describe its characteristics. They acknowledged Meitner's priority, and agreed to the name. The connection to uranium remained a mystery, as neither of the two known isotopes of uranium (uranium-234 and uranium-238) decayed into protactinium. It remained unsolved until uranium-235 was discovered by Arthur Jeffrey Dempster in 1935.

== Beta radiation ==
In 1921, Meitner accepted an invitation from Manne Siegbahn to come to Sweden and give a series of lectures on radioactivity as a visiting professor at Lund University. She found that very little research had been done on radioactivity in Sweden, but she was eager to learn about X-ray spectroscopy, which was Siegbahn's specialty. At his laboratory, she met a Dutch doctoral candidate, Dirk Coster, who was studying X-ray spectroscopy, and his wife Miep, who was working on her doctorate in Indonesian language and culture. Armed with her newly acquired knowledge of X-ray spectroscopy, Meitner took a fresh look at the beta-ray spectra when she returned to Berlin. It was known that some beta emission was primary, with electrons being ejected directly from the nucleus, and some was secondary, in which alpha particles from the nucleus knocked electrons out of orbit. Meitner was sceptical of Chadwick's claim that the spectral lines were entirely due to secondary electrons, while the primary ones formed a continuous spectrum. Using techniques developed by Jean Danysz, she examined the spectra of lead-210, radium-226 and thorium-238. Meitner discovered the cause of the emission of electrons from surfaces of atoms with "signature" energies, now known as the Auger-Meitner effect, in 1922. The effect is co-named after Pierre Victor Auger, who independently discovered it in 1923.

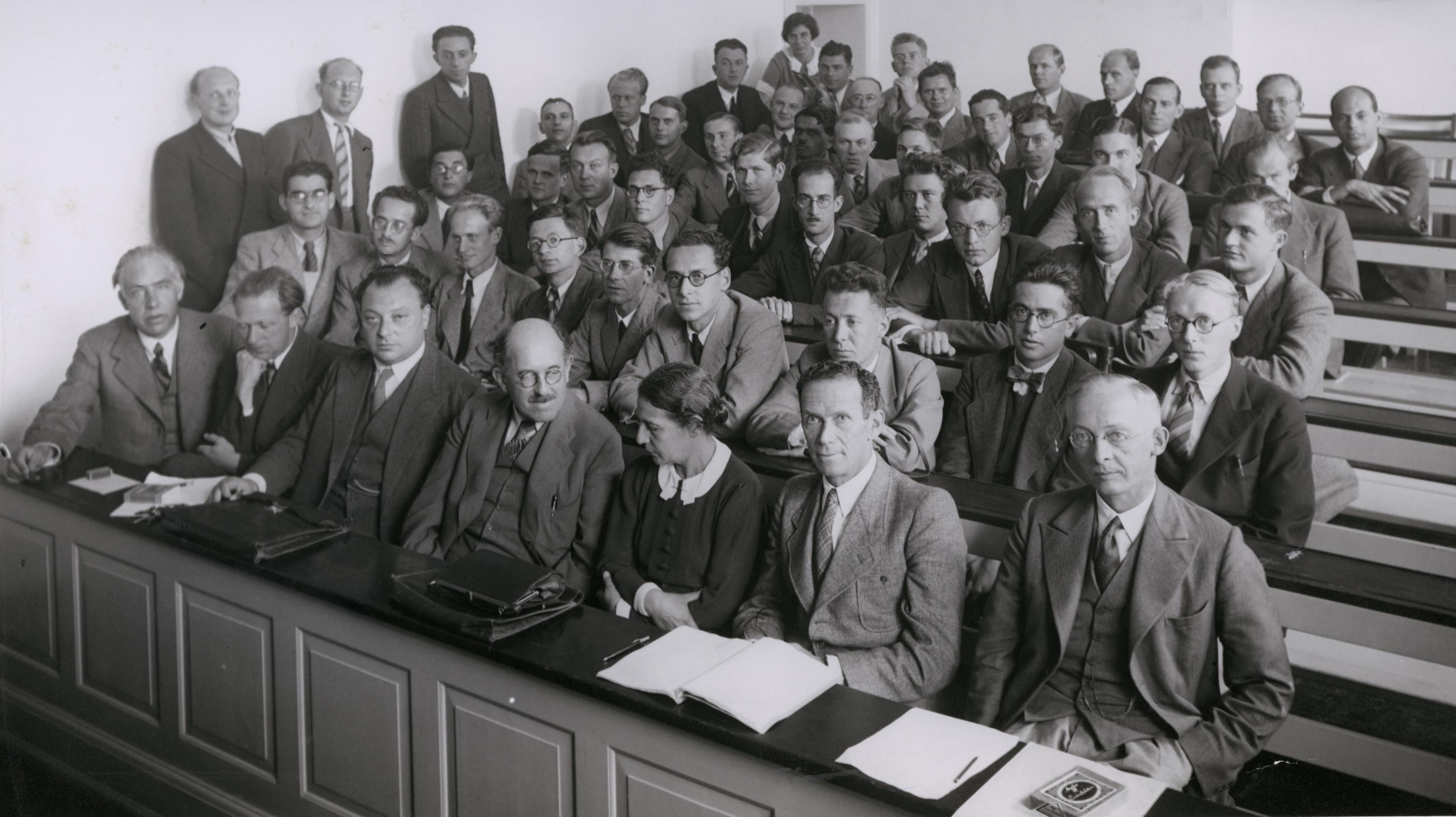
At a conference in 1937, Meitner shares the front row with (left to right) Niels Bohr, Werner Heisenberg, Wolfgang Pauli, Otto Stern, Rudolf Ladenburg and Jacob Christian Georg Jacobsen; Hilde Levi (at the very back) is the only other woman in the room.

Women were granted the right of habilitation in Prussia in 1920, and in 1922 Meitner was granted her habilitation and became a Privatdozentin. She was the first woman to receive her habilitation in physics in Prussia, and only the second in Germany after Hedwig Kohn. Since Meitner had already published over 40 papers, she was not required to submit a thesis, but Max von Laue recommended that the requirement for an inaugural lecture not be waived, since he was interested in what she had to say. She therefore gave an inaugural lecture on "Problems of Cosmic Physics". From 1923 to 1933, she taught a colloquium or tutorial at Friedrich Wilhelm University each semester, and supervised doctoral students at the KWI for Chemistry. In 1926, she became an außerordentlicher Professor ('extraordinary professor'), the first woman university physics professor in Germany. Her physics section became larger, and she acquired a permanent assistant. Scientists from Germany and around the world came to the KWI for Chemistry to conduct research under her supervision. In 1930, Meitner taught a seminar on "Questions of Atomic Physics and Atomic Chemistry" with Leó Szilárd.

Two views of the Auger−Meitner effect. An incident electron or photon creates a core hole in the 1s level. An electron from the 2s level fills in the 1s hole and the transition energy is imparted to a 2p electron which is emitted. The final atomic state thus has two holes.

Meitner had a Wilson cloud chamber constructed at the KWI for Chemistry, the first one in Berlin, and with her student Kurt Freitag studied the tracks of alpha particles that did not collide with a nucleus. With her assistant Kurt Philipp she later used it to take the first images of positron traces from gamma radiation. She proved Chadwick's assertion that the discrete spectral lines were entirely the result of secondary electrons, and the continuous spectra were therefore indeed entirely caused by the primary ones. In 1927, Charles Drummond Ellis and William Alfred Wooster measured the energy of the continuous spectrum produced by the beta decay of bismuth-210 at 0.34 MeV where the energy of each disintegration was 0.35 MeV. Thus, the spectrum accounted for nearly, but not all, of the energy. Meitner found this result so troubling that she repeated the experiment with Wilhelm Orthmann using an improved method, and verified Ellis and Wooster's results.

It appeared that the law of conservation of energy did not hold for beta decay, something Meitner regarded as unacceptable. In 1930, Wolfgang Pauli wrote an open letter to Meitner and Hans Geiger in which he proposed that the continuous spectrum was caused by the emission of a second particle during beta decay, one that had no electric charge and little or no rest mass. The idea was taken up by Enrico Fermi in his 1934 theory of beta decay, and he gave the name "neutrino" to the hypothetical neutral particle. At the time there was scant hope of detecting neutrinos, but in 1956 Clyde Cowan and Frederick Reines did just that.

== Nazi Germany ==
Adolf Hitler was sworn in as the Chancellor of Germany on 30 January 1933, as his Nazi Party (NSDAP) was now the largest party in the Reichstag. The 7 April 1933 Law for the Restoration of the Professional Civil Service removed Jews from the civil service, which included academia. Meitner never tried to conceal her Jewish descent, but initially was exempt from its impact on multiple grounds: she had been employed before 1914, had served in the military during the World War, was an Austrian rather than a German citizen, and the Kaiser Wilhelm Institute was a government-industry partnership. However, she was dismissed from her adjunct professorship on 6 September on the grounds that her World War I service was not at the front, and she had not completed her habilitation until 1922. This had no effect on her salary or work at the KWI for Chemistry. Carl Bosch, the director of IG Farben, a major sponsor of the KWI for Chemistry, assured Meitner that her position there was safe. Although Hahn and Meitner remained in charge, their assistants, Otto Erbacher and Kurt Philipp respectively, who were both NSDAP members, were given increasing influence over the day-to-day running of the institute.

Others were not so fortunate; her nephew Otto Robert Frisch was dismissed from his post in the Institute for Physical Chemistry at the University of Hamburg, as was Otto Stern, the director of the institute. Stern found Frisch a position with Patrick Blackett at Birkbeck College in England, and he later worked at the Niels Bohr Institute in Copenhagen from 1934 to 1939. Fritz Strassman had come to the Kaiser Wilhelm Institute for Chemistry to study under Hahn to improve his employment prospects. He declined a lucrative offer of employment because it required political training and Nazi Party membership, and resigned from the Society of German Chemists when it became part of the Nazi German Labour Front rather than become a member of a Nazi-controlled organisation. As a result, he could neither work in the chemical industry nor receive his habilitation. Meitner persuaded Hahn to hire him as an assistant. Soon he would be credited as a third collaborator on the papers they produced, and would sometimes even be listed first. Between 1933 and 1935, Meitner published exclusively in the journal Naturwissenschaften, as its editor Arnold Berliner was Jewish, and he continued to accept submissions from Jewish scientists. This generated a boycott of the publication, and in August 1935 the publisher, Springer-Verlag, fired Berliner.

== Transmutation ==
After Chadwick discovered the neutron in 1932, Irène Curie and Frédéric Joliot irradiated aluminium foil with alpha particles, and found that this results in a short-lived radioactive isotope of phosphorus. They noted that positron emission continued after the irradiation ceased. Not only had they discovered a new form of radioactive decay, they had transmuted an element into a hitherto unknown radioactive isotope of another, thereby inducing radioactivity where there had been none before. Radiochemistry was now no longer confined to certain heavy elements, but extended to the entire periodic table. Chadwick noted that being electrically neutral, neutrons could penetrate the nucleus more easily than protons or alpha particles. Enrico Fermi and his colleagues in Rome picked up on this idea, and began irradiating elements with neutrons.

The radioactive displacement law of Fajans and Soddy said that beta decay causes isotopes to move one element up on the periodic table, and alpha decay causes them to move two down. When Fermi's group bombarded uranium atoms with neutrons, they found a complex mix of half-lives. Fermi therefore concluded that new elements with atomic numbers greater than 92 (known as transuranium elements) had been created. Meitner and Hahn had not collaborated for many years, but Meitner was eager to investigate Fermi's results. Hahn, initially, was not, but he changed his mind when Aristid von Grosse suggested that what Fermi had found was an isotope of protactinium. "The only question", Hahn later wrote, "seemed to be whether Fermi had found isotopes of transuranium elements, or isotopes of the next-lower element, protactinium. At that time Lise Meitner and I decided to repeat Fermi's experiments in order to find out whether the 13-minute isotope was a protactinium isotope or not. It was a logical decision, having been the discoverers of protactinium."

Between 1934 and 1938, Hahn, Meitner, and Strassmann found a great number of radioactive transmutation products, all of which they regarded as transuranic. At that time, the existence of actinides was not yet established, and uranium was wrongly believed to be a group 6 element similar to tungsten. It followed that the first transuranic elements would be similar to group 7 to 10 elements, rhenium and platinoids. They established the presence of multiple isotopes of at least four such elements, and (mistakenly) identified them as elements with atomic numbers 93 to 96. They were the first scientists to measure the 23-minute half-life of the synthetic radioisotope uranium-239 and to establish chemically that it was an isotope of uranium, but with their weak neutron sources they were unable to continue this work to its logical conclusion and identify the real element 93. They identified ten different half-lives, with varying degrees of certainty. To account for them, Meitner had to hypothesise a new class of reaction and the alpha decay of uranium, neither of which had ever been reported before, and for which physical evidence was lacking. Hahn and Strassmann refined their chemical procedures, while Meitner devised new experiments to examine the reaction processes.

In May 1937, Hahn and Meitner issued parallel reports, one in Zeitschrift für Physik with Meitner as the first author, and one in Chemische Berichte with Hahn as the first author. Hahn concluded his by stating emphatically: Vor allem steht ihre chemische Verschiedenheit von allen bisher bekannten Elementen außerhalb jeder Diskussion ('Above all, their chemical distinction from all previously known elements needs no further discussion'). Meitner was increasingly uncertain. She considered the possibility that the reactions were from different isotopes of uranium; three were known: uranium-238, uranium-235 and uranium-234. However, when she calculated the neutron cross section, it was too large to be anything other than the most abundant isotope, uranium-238, and concluded that it must be another case of nuclear isomerism, a phenomenon Hahn had discovered in protactinium years before. She therefore ended her report on a very different note to Hahn, reporting that: "The process must be neutron capture by uranium-238, which leads to three isomeric nuclei of uranium-239. This result is very difficult to reconcile with current concepts of the nucleus."

== Escape from Germany ==
The Anschluss, Germany's annexation of Austria on 12 March 1938, made Meitner a stateless person, since German citizenship was denied her because of the now applicable German anti-Jewish laws. Niels Bohr extended an offer to lecture in Copenhagen, and Paul Scherrer invited her to attend a congress in Switzerland, with all expenses paid. Carl Bosch still said that she could remain at the KWI for Chemistry, but by May she was aware that the Reich Ministry of Science, Education and Culture was looking into her case. On 9 May, she decided to accept Bohr's invitation to go to Copenhagen, where Frisch worked, but when she went to the Danish consulate to get a travel visa, she was told that Denmark no longer recognised her Austrian passport as valid. She could not leave for Denmark, Switzerland or any other country.

Bohr came to Berlin in June, and was gravely concerned. When he returned to Copenhagen, he began looking for a position for Meitner in Scandinavia. He also asked Hans Kramers to see if anything was available in the Netherlands. Kramers contacted Coster, who in turn notified Adriaan Fokker. Coster and Fokker attempted to secure a position for Meitner at the University of Groningen. They found that the Rockefeller Foundation would not support refugee scientists, and that the International Federation of University Women had been flooded with applications for support from Austria. On 27 June, Meitner received an offer of a one-year position at Manne Siegbahn's new Manne Siegbahn Laboratory in Stockholm, then under construction, which would be devoted to nuclear physics, and she decided to accept it. But on 4 July she learned that academics would no longer be granted permission to travel abroad.

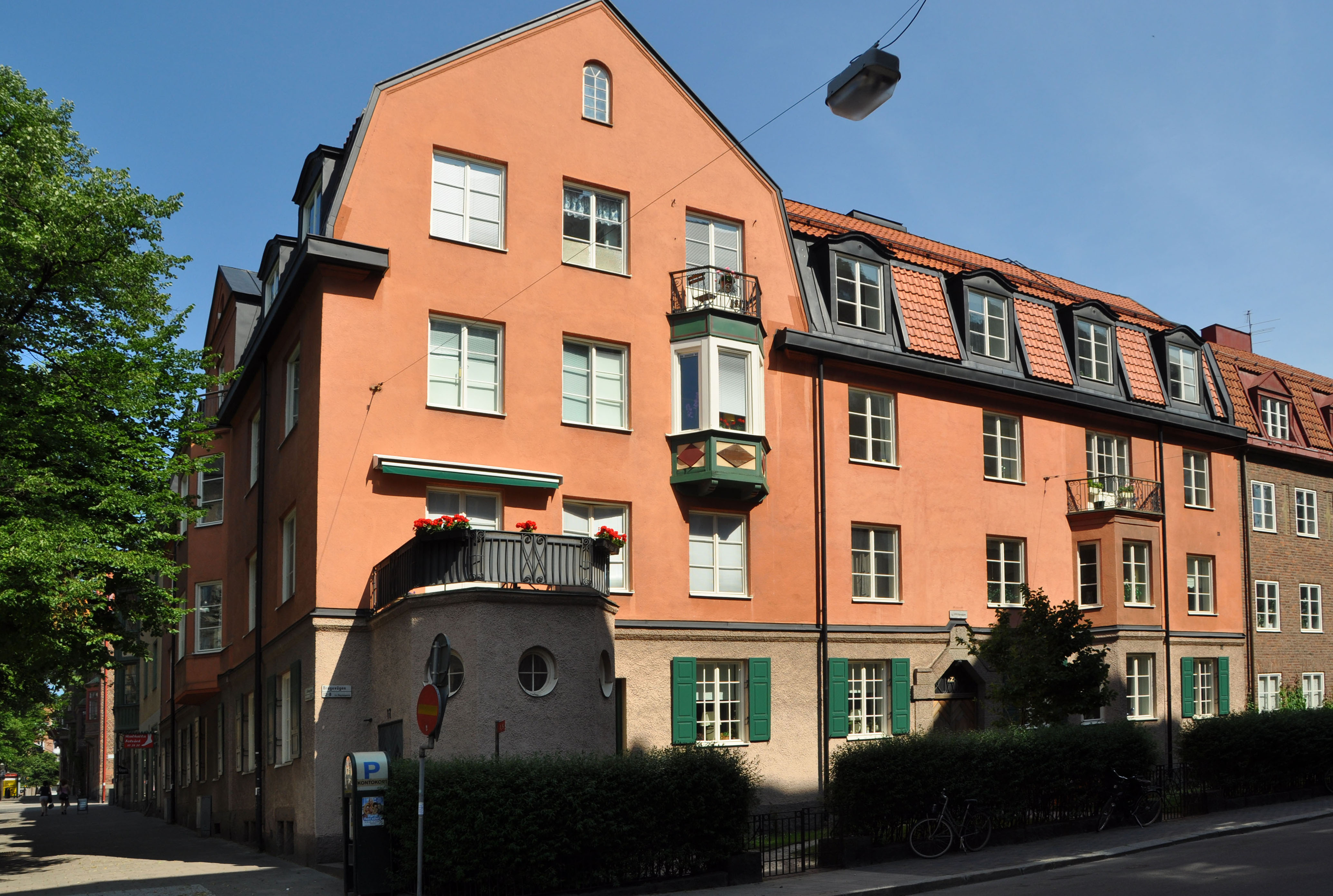
Meitner lived at this address for most of her years while in Sweden.

Through Bohr in Copenhagen, Peter Debye communicated with Coster and Fokker, and they approached the Netherlands Ministry of Education with an appeal to allow Meitner to come to the Netherlands. As foreigners were not allowed to work for pay, an appointment as a non-salaried privaat-docente was required. Wander Johannes de Haas and Anton Eduard van Arkel arranged for one at Leiden University. Coster also spoke to the head of the border guards, who assured him that Meitner would be admitted. A friend of Coster, E. H. Ebels, was a local politician from the border area, and he spoke directly to the guards on the border.

On 11 July, Coster arrived in Berlin, where he stayed with Debye. The following morning, Meitner arrived early at the KWI for Chemistry, and Hahn briefed her on the plan. To avoid suspicion, she maintained her usual routine, remaining at the institute until 20:00 correcting an associate's paper for publication. Hahn and Paul Rosbaud helped her pack two small suitcases, carrying only summer clothes. Hahn gave her a diamond ring he had inherited from his mother in case of emergency; she took only 10 marks in her purse (equivalent to €40 in 2021). She then spent the night at Hahn's house. The next morning Meitner met Coster at the railway station, where they pretended to have met by chance. They travelled on a lightly used line to Bad Nieuweschans railway station on the border, which they crossed without incident; the German border guards may have thought that Meitner was the wife of a professor. A telegram from Pauli informed Coster that he was now "as famous for the abduction of Lise Meitner as for the discovery of hafnium".

Meitner learned on 26 July that Sweden had granted her permission to enter on her Austrian passport, and two days later she flew to Copenhagen, where she was greeted by Frisch, and stayed with Niels and Margrethe Bohr at their holiday house in Tisvilde. On 1 August she travelled by train and steamship to Gothenburg station in Sweden, where she was met by Eva von Bahr. They took a train, and then a steamer, to Von Bahr's home in Kungälv, where she stayed until September. Hahn told everyone at the KWI for Chemistry that Meitner had gone to Vienna to visit her relatives, and a few days later the institute had closed for the summer. On 23 August, she wrote to Bosch requesting retirement. He tried to ship her belongings to Sweden, but the Reich Ministry of Education insisted they remain in Germany.

Meitner was concerned about her family in Austria. One of her first actions in Sweden was to apply for a Swedish immigration permit for Gusti and her husband Justinian (Jutz) Frisch. Hahn selected Josef Mattauch to replace her as head of the physics section, and went to Vienna to offer him the job. While there he dined with Meitner's sisters Gusti and Gisela and their husbands Jutz Frisch and Karl Lion on 9 November. The next day Gusti informed him that Frisch had been arrested. That day, Meitner arrived in Copenhagen; arranging a travel visa had been difficult with her invalid Austrian passport. Hahn joined her in Copenhagen on 13 November, and had discussions about the uranium research with Meitner, Bohr and Otto Robert Frisch.

== Nuclear fission ==
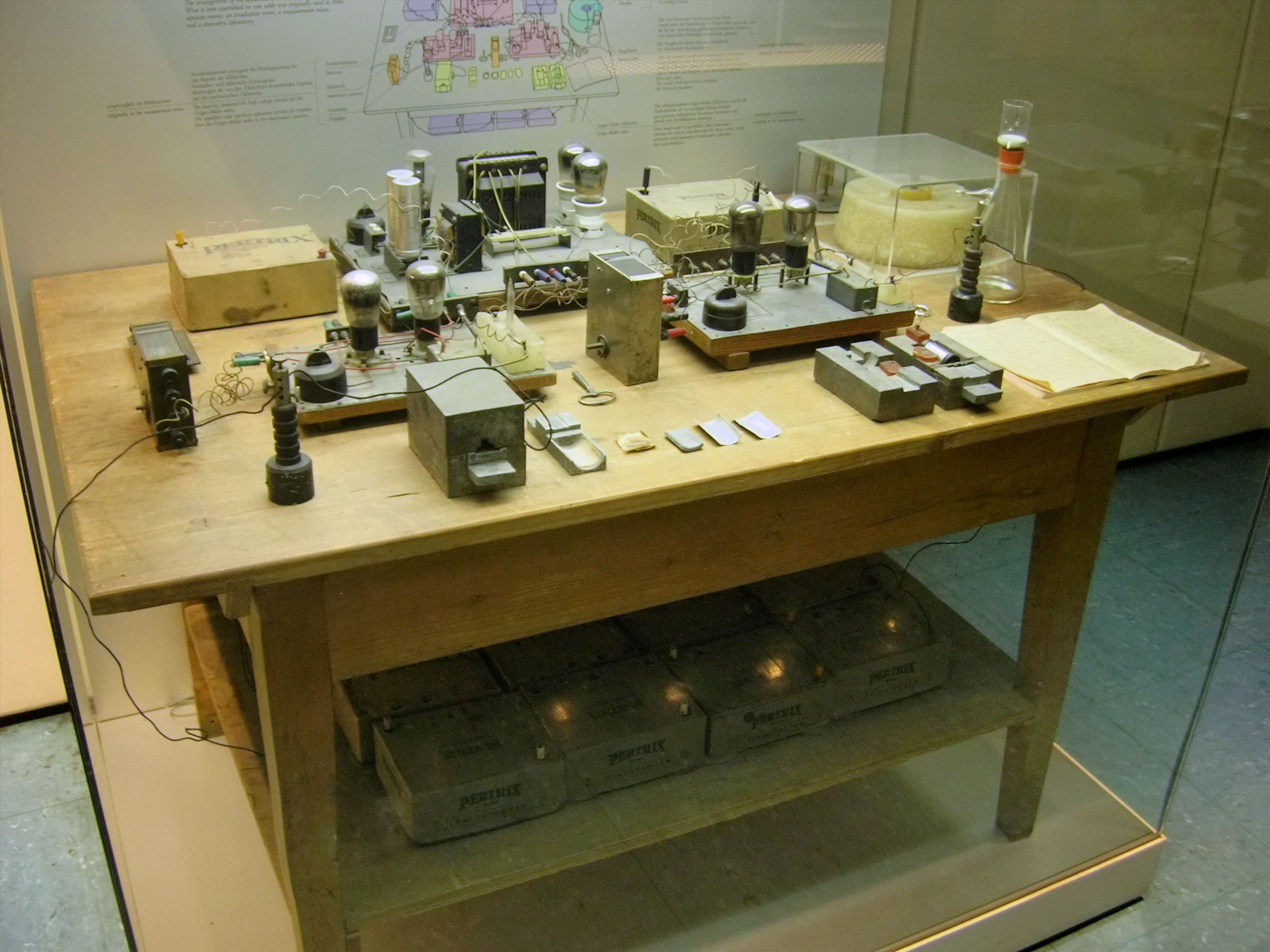
This was touted for many years as the table and experimental apparatus with which Otto Hahn discovered nuclear fission in 1938. The table and instruments are representative of the ones used, but not necessarily the originals, and would not have been together on the one table in the same room. Pressure from historians, scientists and feminists caused the Deutsches Museum to alter the display in 1988 to acknowledge the role of Meitner, Frisch and Strassmann.

Hahn and Strassmann isolated the three radium isotopes (verified by their half-lives) and used fractional crystallisation to separate it from its barium carrier by adding barium bromide crystals in four steps. Since radium precipitates preferentially in a solution of barium bromide, at each step the fraction drawn off would contain less radium than the one before. However, they found no difference between each of the fractions. In case their process was faulty in some way, they verified it with known isotopes of radium; the process was fine. On 19 December, Hahn wrote to Meitner, informing her that the radium isotopes behaved chemically like barium. Anxious to finish up before the Christmas break, Hahn and Strassmann submitted their findings to Naturwissenschaften on 22 December without waiting for Meitner to reply. Hahn concluded the paper with: "As chemists... we should substitute the symbols Ba, La, Ce for Ra, Ac, Th. As 'nuclear chemists' fairly close to physics we cannot yet bring ourselves to take this step which contradicts all previous experience in physics."

Frisch normally celebrated Christmas with Meitner in Berlin, but in 1938 she accepted an invitation from Eva von Bahr to spend it with her family at Kungälv, and Meitner asked Frisch to join her there. Meitner received the letter from Hahn describing his chemical proof that some of the product of the bombardment of uranium with neutrons was barium. Barium had an atomic mass 40% less than uranium, and no previously known methods of radioactive decay could account for such a large difference in the mass of the nucleus. Nonetheless, she had immediately written back to Hahn to say: "At the moment the assumption of such a thoroughgoing breakup seems very difficult to me, but in nuclear physics we have experienced so many surprises, that one cannot unconditionally say: 'It is impossible.'"

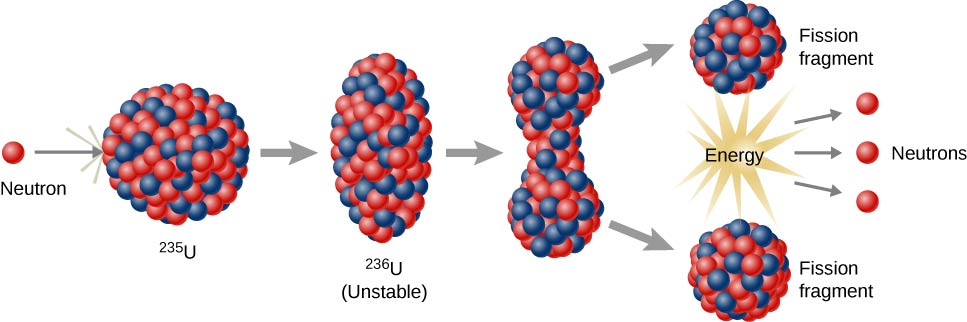
Liquid-drop model of nuclear fission

Meitner dismissed the possibility that Hahn's identification of barium was in error; her faith in Hahn's expertise as a chemist was absolute. Meitner and Frisch then considered how it could be possible. Previous attempts at atom splitting had never had enough energy to chip away more than individual protons or alpha particles, but a barium nucleus was much larger. They considered the liquid-drop model of the nucleus that had been proposed by George Gamow: perhaps it was possible for a drop to become elongated and then divide itself in two.

Frisch later wrote:

At that point we both sat down on a tree trunk (all that discussion had taken place while we walked through the wood in the snow, I with my skis on, Lise Meitner making good her claim that she could walk just as fast without), and started to calculate on scraps of paper. The charge of a uranium nucleus, we found, was indeed large enough to overcome the effect of the surface tension almost completely; so the uranium nucleus might indeed resemble a very wobbly unstable drop, ready to divide itself at the slightest provocation, such as the impact of a single neutron.

But there was another problem. After separation, the two drops would be driven apart by their mutual electric repulsion and would acquire high speed and hence a very large energy, about 200 MeV in all; where could that energy come from? Fortunately Lise Meitner remembered the empirical formula for computing the masses of nuclei and worked out that the two nuclei formed by the division of a uranium nucleus together would be lighter than the original uranium nucleus by about one-fifth the mass of a proton. Now whenever mass disappears energy is created, according to Einstein's formula E = mc^{2}, and one-fifth of a proton mass was just equivalent to 200 MeV. So here was the source for that energy; it all fitted!

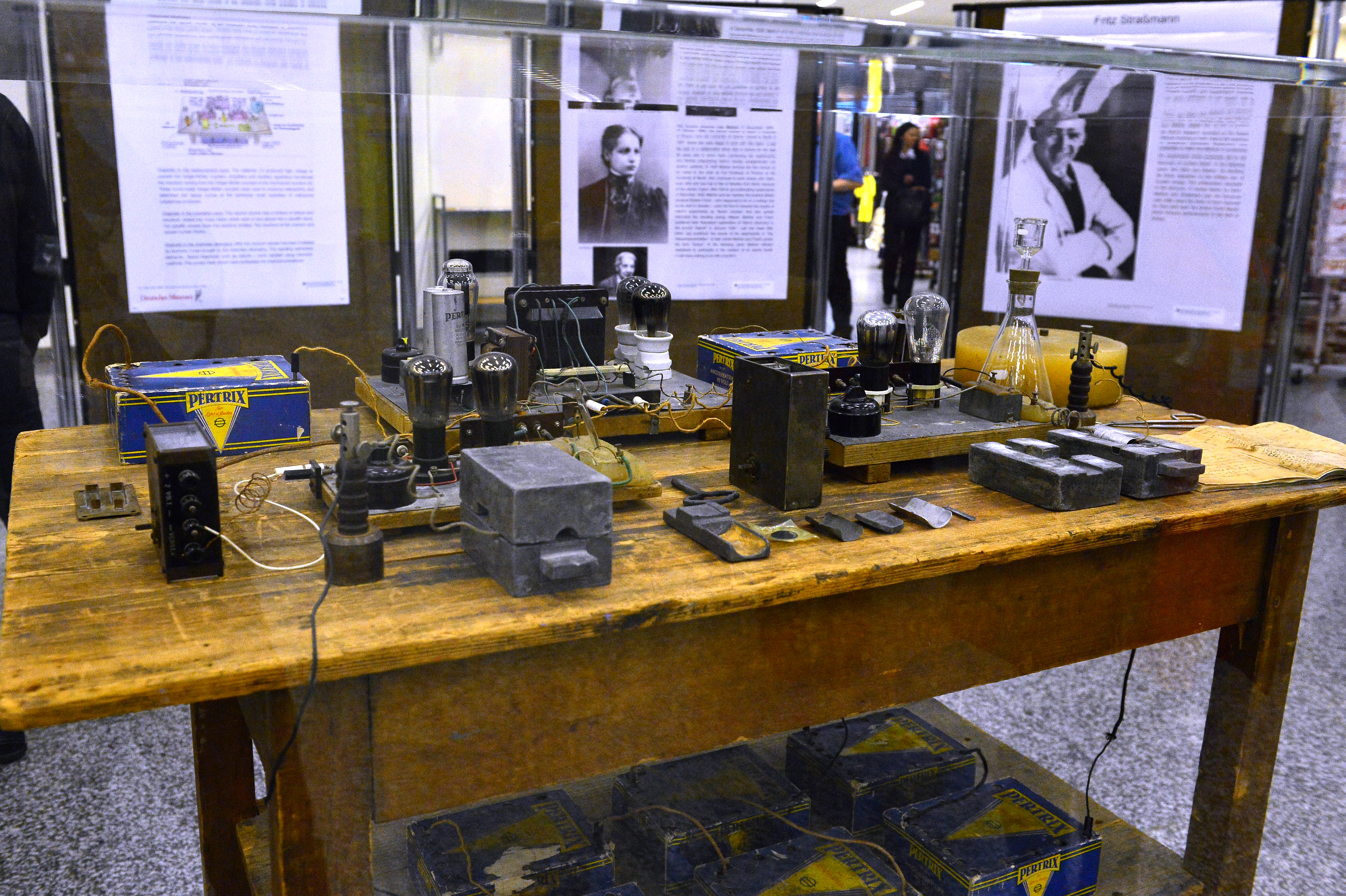
Exhibition to mark the 75th anniversary of the discovery of nuclear fission, at the Vienna International Centre in 2013. The table (on loan from the Deutsches Museum Munich) is now described as a replica and images of Meitner and Strassmann are prominently displayed.

Meitner and Frisch had correctly interpreted Hahn's results to mean that the nucleus of uranium had split roughly in half. The first two reactions that the Berlin group had observed were light elements created by the breakup of uranium nuclei; the third, the 23-minute one, was a decay into the real element 93. On returning to Copenhagen, Frisch informed Bohr, who slapped his forehead and exclaimed "What idiots we have been!" Bohr promised not to say anything until they had a paper ready for publication. To speed the process, they decided to submit a one-page note to Nature. At this point, the only evidence that they had was the barium. Logically, if barium was formed, the other element must be krypton, but Hahn had mistakenly believed that the atomic masses had to add up to 239 rather than the atomic numbers adding up to 92, and thought it was masurium (technetium), and so did not check for it:

_{92}U + n → _{56}Ba + _{36}Kr + some n (Note: Although Hahn and Strassmann believed that fission had occurred in the uranium-238 isotope, their observations indicate that they actually observed fission in uranium-235.)

Over a series of long-distance phone calls, Meitner and Frisch came up with a simple experiment to bolster their claim: to measure the recoil of the fission fragments, using a Geiger counter with the threshold set above that of the alpha particles. Frisch conducted the experiment on 13 January, and found the pulses caused by the reaction just as they had predicted. He decided he needed a name for the newly discovered nuclear process. He spoke to William A. Arnold, an American biologist working with George de Hevesy, and asked him what biologists called the process by which living cells divided into two. Arnold told him that biologists called it fission. Frisch then applied that name to the nuclear process in his paper. He mailed both papers to Nature on 16 January; the jointly-authored note appeared in print on 11 February and Frisch's paper on recoil on 18 February.

These three reports, the first Hahn-Strassmann publications of 6 January and 10 February 1939, and the Frisch-Meitner publication of 11 February 1939, had electrifying effects on the scientific community. In 1940 Frisch and Rudolf Peierls produced the Frisch–Peierls memorandum, which established that an atomic explosion could be generated.

== Nobel Prize ==
Despite the many honours that Meitner received in her lifetime, she did not receive the Nobel Prize while it was awarded to Otto Hahn for the discovery of nuclear fission. She was nominated 49 times for Physics and Chemistry Nobel Prizes but never won. On 15 November 1945, the Royal Swedish Academy of Sciences announced that Hahn had been awarded the 1944 Nobel Prize in Chemistry for "his discovery of the fission of heavy atomic nuclei". (Note: The Nobel Committee had decided to defer the 1944 award for one year due to the war.) Meitner was the one who told Hahn and Strassman to test their radium in more detail, and it was she who told Hahn that it was possible for the nucleus of uranium to disintegrate. Without these contributions of Meitner, Hahn would not have found that the uranium nucleus can split in half.

In 1945 the Nobel Committee for Chemistry in Sweden that selected the Nobel Prize in Chemistry decided to award that prize solely to Hahn, who found out from a newspaper while detained in Farm Hall in England. In the 1990s, the long-sealed records of the Nobel Committee's proceedings became public, and the comprehensive biography of Meitner published in 1996 by Ruth Lewin Sime took advantage of this unsealing to reconsider Meitner's exclusion. In a 1997 article in the American Physical Society journal Physics Today, Sime and her colleagues Elisabeth Crawford and Mark Walker wrote:

It appears that Lise Meitner did not share the 1944 prize because the structure of the Nobel committees was ill-suited to assess interdisciplinary work; because the members of the chemistry committee were unable or unwilling to judge her contribution fairly; and because during the war the Swedish scientists relied on their own limited expertise. Meitner's exclusion from the chemistry award may well be summarized as a mixture of disciplinary bias, political obtuseness, ignorance, and haste.

Max Perutz, the 1962 Nobel Prize for chemistry winner, reached a similar conclusion:

Having been locked up in the Nobel Committee's files these fifty years, the documents leading to this unjust award now reveal that the protracted deliberations by the Nobel jury were hampered by lack of appreciation both of the joint work that had preceded the discovery and of Meitner's written and verbal contributions after her flight from Berlin.

The five-member physics committee included Manne Siegbahn; his former student Erik Hulthén, the professor of experimental physics at Uppsala University; and Axel Lindh, who eventually succeeded Hulthén. All three were part of the Siegbahn school of X-ray spectroscopy. The poor relationship between Siegbahn and Meitner was a factor here, as was the bias towards experimental rather than theoretical physics. In his report on the work of Meitner and Frisch, Hulthén relied on pre-war papers. He did not think that their work was groundbreaking and argued that the prize for physics was given for experimental rather than theoretical work, which had not been the case for many years. At the time Meitner herself wrote in a letter: "Surely Hahn fully deserved the Nobel Prize for chemistry. There is really no doubt about it. But I believe that Frisch and I contributed something not insignificant to the clarification of the process of uranium fission—how it originates and that it produces so much energy and that was something very remote to Hahn." Hahn's Nobel Prize was long expected; both he and Meitner had been nominated for both the chemistry and the physics prizes several times even before the discovery of nuclear fission. According to the Nobel Prize archive, she was nominated 19 times for Nobel Prize in Chemistry between 1924 and 1948, and 30 times for Nobel Prize in Physics between 1937 and 1967. Her nominators included Arthur Compton, Dirk Coster, Kasimir Fajans, James Franck, Otto Hahn, Oskar Klein, Niels Bohr, Max Planck and Max Born. Despite not having been awarded the Nobel Prize, Meitner was invited to attend the Lindau Nobel Laureate Meeting in 1962.

== Later life ==
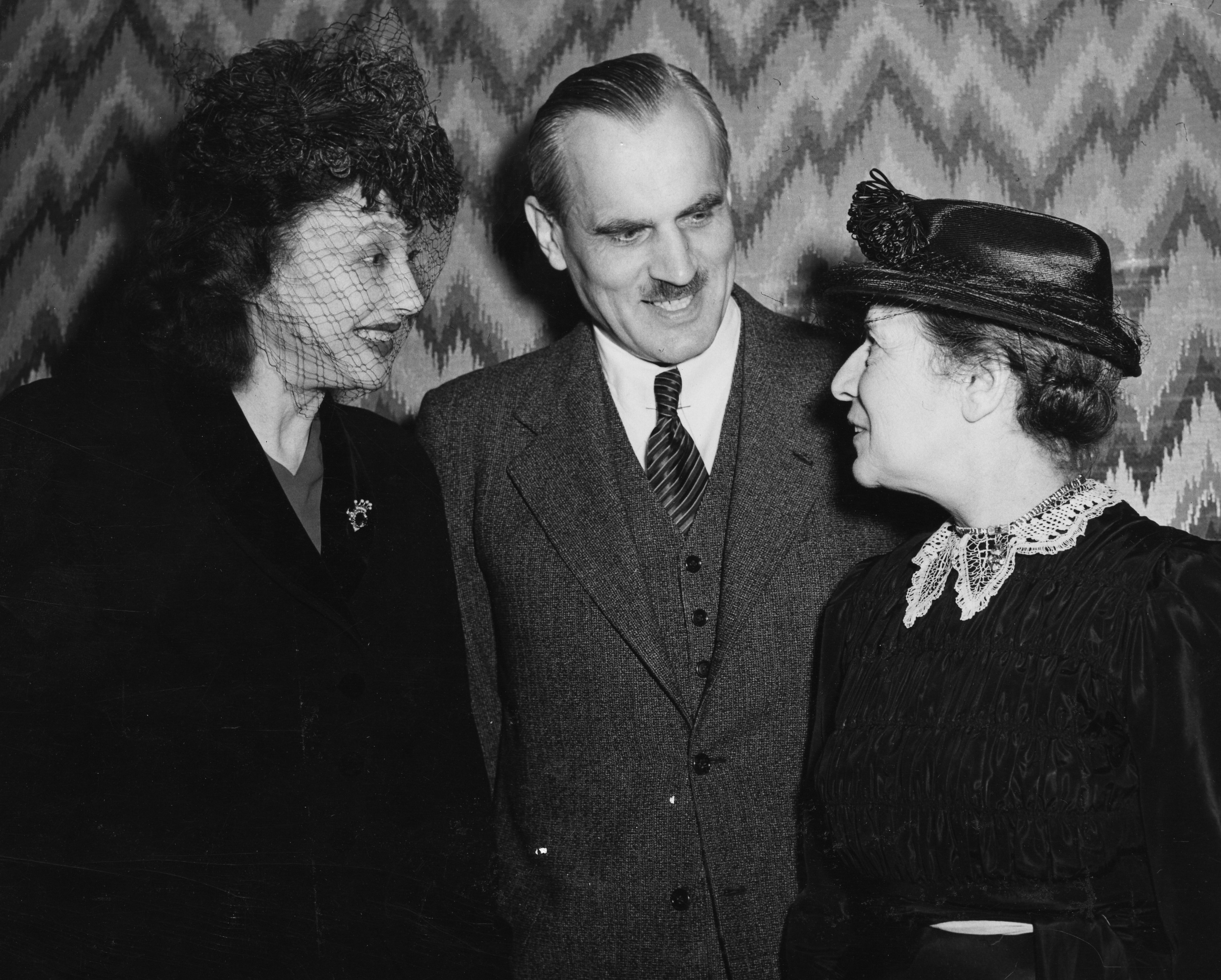
Meitner with actress Katharine Cornell and physicist Arthur Compton on 6 June 1946

Meitner found that Siegbahn did not want her. At the time the offer to come to Sweden had been extended, he had said that he had no money, and could only offer Meitner a place to work. Eva von Bahr had then written to Carl Wilhelm Oseen, who had provided money from the Nobel Foundation. This left her with laboratory space, but now she had to perform work that she had been able to delegate to her laboratory technicians for the previous twenty years. Ruth Lewin Sime wrote that:

In Sweden there was no general sympathy for refugees from Nazi Germany: the country was small, with a weak economy and no immigrant tradition, and its academic culture had always been firmly pro-German, a tradition that did not change much until the middle of the war when it became obvious that Germany would not win. During the war, members of Siegbahn's group saw Meitner as an outsider, withdrawn and depressed; they did not understand the displacement and anxiety common to all refugees, or the trauma of losing friends and relatives to the Holocaust, or the exceptional isolation of a woman who had single mindedly devoted her life to her work.

On 14 January 1939, Meitner learned that her brother-in-law Jutz had been released from Dachau and he and her sister Gusti were permitted to emigrate to Sweden. Jutz's boss, Gottfried Bermann, had escaped to Sweden, and he offered Jutz his old job back at the publishing firm if he was able to come. Niels Bohr interceded with a Swedish official, Justitieråd Alexandersson, who said that Jutz would receive a labour permit on arrival in Sweden. He worked there until he was pensioned off in 1948, and then moved to Cambridge to join Otto Robert Frisch. Her sister Gisela and brother-in-law Karl Lion moved to England, and Meitner also considered moving there. She visited Cambridge in July 1939 and accepted an offer from William Lawrence Bragg and John Cockcroft of a position at the Cavendish Laboratory on a three-year contract with Girton College, Cambridge, but the Second World War broke out in September 1939 before she could make the move.

In Sweden, Meitner continued her research as best she could. She measured the neutron cross sections of thorium, lead and uranium using dysprosium as a neutron detector, an assay technique pioneered by George de Hevesy and Hilde Levi. She was able to arrange for Hedwig Kohn, who faced deportation to Poland, to come to Sweden, and eventually to emigrate to the United States, travelling via the Soviet Union. She was unsuccessful in bringing Stefen Meyer out of Germany, but he managed to survive the war. She declined an offer to join Frisch on the British contribution to the Manhattan Project at the Los Alamos Laboratory, declaring "I will have nothing to do with a bomb!" She later said that the atomic bombings of Hiroshima and Nagasaki had come as a surprise to her, and that she was "sorry that the bomb had to be invented". After the war, Meitner acknowledged her own moral failing in staying in Germany from 1933 to 1938. She wrote: "It was not only stupid but very wrong that I did not leave at once." She regretted her own inaction during this period, and was also bitterly critical of Hahn, Max von Laue, Werner Heisenberg, and other German scientists. In a June 1945 letter addressed to Hahn, that he never received, she wrote:

You all worked for Nazi Germany. And you did not even try passive resistance. Granted, to absolve your conscience you helped some oppressed person here and there, but millions of innocent human beings were murdered and there was no protest. Here in neutral Sweden, long before the end of the war, there was discussion of what should be done with German scholars once the war is over. What then must the English and Americans be thinking? I and many others are of the opinion that the one path for you would be to deliver an open statement that you are aware that through your passivity you share responsibility for what has happened, and that you have the need to work for what can be done to make amends. But many think it is too late for that. These people say that first you betrayed your friends, then your men and your children in that you let them stake their lives on a criminal war – and finally that you betrayed Germany itself, because when the war was already quite hopeless, you never once spoke out against the meaningless destruction of Germany. That sounds pitiless but nevertheless I believe that the reason I write this to you is true friendship. In the last few days one had heard of the unbelievably gruesome things in the concentration camps; it overwhelms everything one previously feared. When I heard on English radio a very detailed report by the English and Americans about Belsen and Buchenwald, I began to cry out loud and lay awake all night. And if you had seen those people who were brought here from the camps. One should take a man like Heisenberg and millions like him, and force them to look at these camps and the martyred people. The way he turned up in Denmark in 1941 is unforgettable.

In the aftermath of the bombing of Hiroshima, Meitner became a celebrity. She had a radio interview with Eleanor Roosevelt, and a few days later another one with a radio station in New York, during which she heard her sister Frida's voice for the first time in years. "I am of Jewish descent", she told Frida, "I am not Jewish by belief, know nothing of the history of Judaism, and do not feel closer to Jews than to other people." On 25 January 1946, Meitner arrived in New York, where she was greeted by her sisters Lola and Frida, and by Frisch, who had made the two-day train trip from Los Alamos. Lola's husband Rudolf Allers arranged a visiting professorship for Meitner at the Catholic University of America. Meitner lectured at Princeton University, Harvard University and Columbia University, and discussed physics with Albert Einstein, Hermann Weyl, Tsung-Dao Lee, Yang Chen-Ning and Isidor Isaac Rabi. She went to Durham, North Carolina and saw Hertha Sponer and Hedwig Kohn, and spent an evening in Washington, DC, with James Chadwick, who was now the head of the British Mission to the Manhattan Project. She also met the project's director, Major General Leslie Groves. She spoke at Smith College, and went to Chicago, where she met Enrico Fermi, Edward Teller, Victor Weisskopf and Leo Szilard. On 8 July, Meitner boarded the RMS Queen Mary for England, where she met with Erwin Schrödinger, Wolfgang Pauli and Max Born. There were belated celebrations for the 300th birthday of Isaac Newton, but the only German invited to attend was Max Planck.

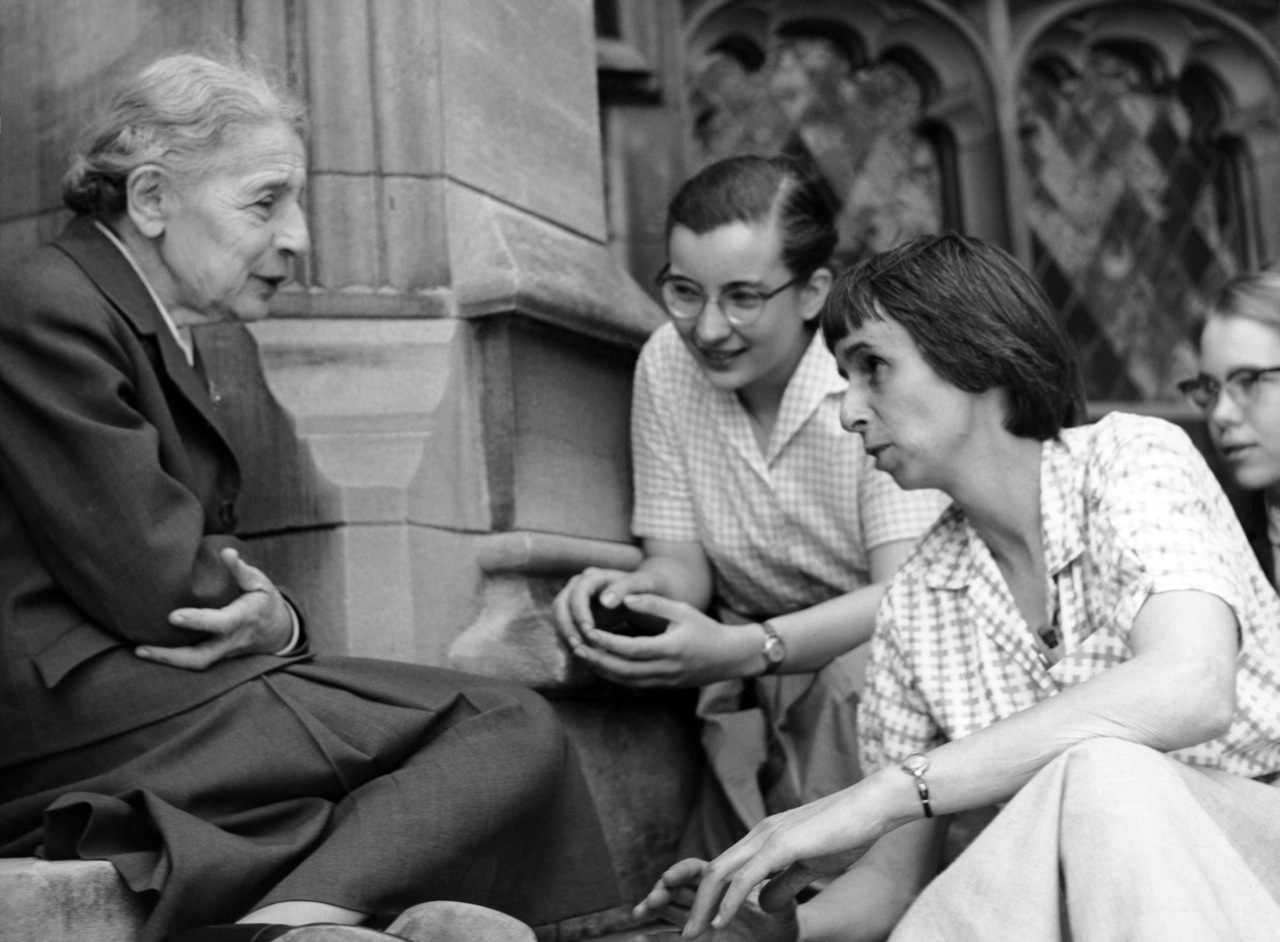
Meitner with students on the steps of the chemistry building at Bryn Mawr College in April 1959

For her friends in Sweden, Siegbahn's opposition to Meitner's Nobel Prize was the final straw, and they resolved to get her a better position. In 1947, Meitner moved to the Royal Institute of Technology (KTH) in Stockholm, where Gudmund Borelius established a new facility for atomic research. There had been scant nuclear physics research in Sweden, which was blamed on Siegbahn's lack of support for Meitner's work, and now such knowledge seemed vital for Sweden's future. At the KTH, Meitner had three rooms, two assistants, and access to technicians, with Sigvard Eklund occupying the room next door. The intention was that Meitner would have the salary and title of a "research professor"—one without teaching duties.

The professorship fell through when the Minister for Education, Tage Erlander, unexpectedly became the Prime Minister of Sweden in 1946, but Borelius and Klein ensured that she had the salary of a professor, if not the title. In 1949, she became a Swedish citizen, but without surrendering her Austrian citizenship thanks to a special act passed by the Riksdag. Plans were approved for R1, Sweden's first nuclear reactor, in 1947, with Eklund as the project director, and Meitner worked with him on its design and construction. In her last scientific papers in 1950 and 1951, she applied magic numbers to nuclear fission. She retired in 1960 and moved to the UK where many of her relatives were.

In the 1950s and 1960s, Meitner enjoyed visiting Germany and staying with Hahn and his family for several days on different occasions. Hahn wrote in his memoirs that he and Meitner had remained lifelong close friends. Even though their friendship was full of trials, arguably more so experienced by Meitner, she "never voiced anything but deep affection for Hahn". On occasions such as their 70th, 75th, 80th and 85th birthdays, they addressed recollections in each other's honour. Hahn emphasised Meitner's intellectual productivity, and work such as her research on the nuclear shell model, always passing over the reasons for her move to Sweden as quickly as possible. She emphasised Hahn's personal qualities, his charm and musical ability.

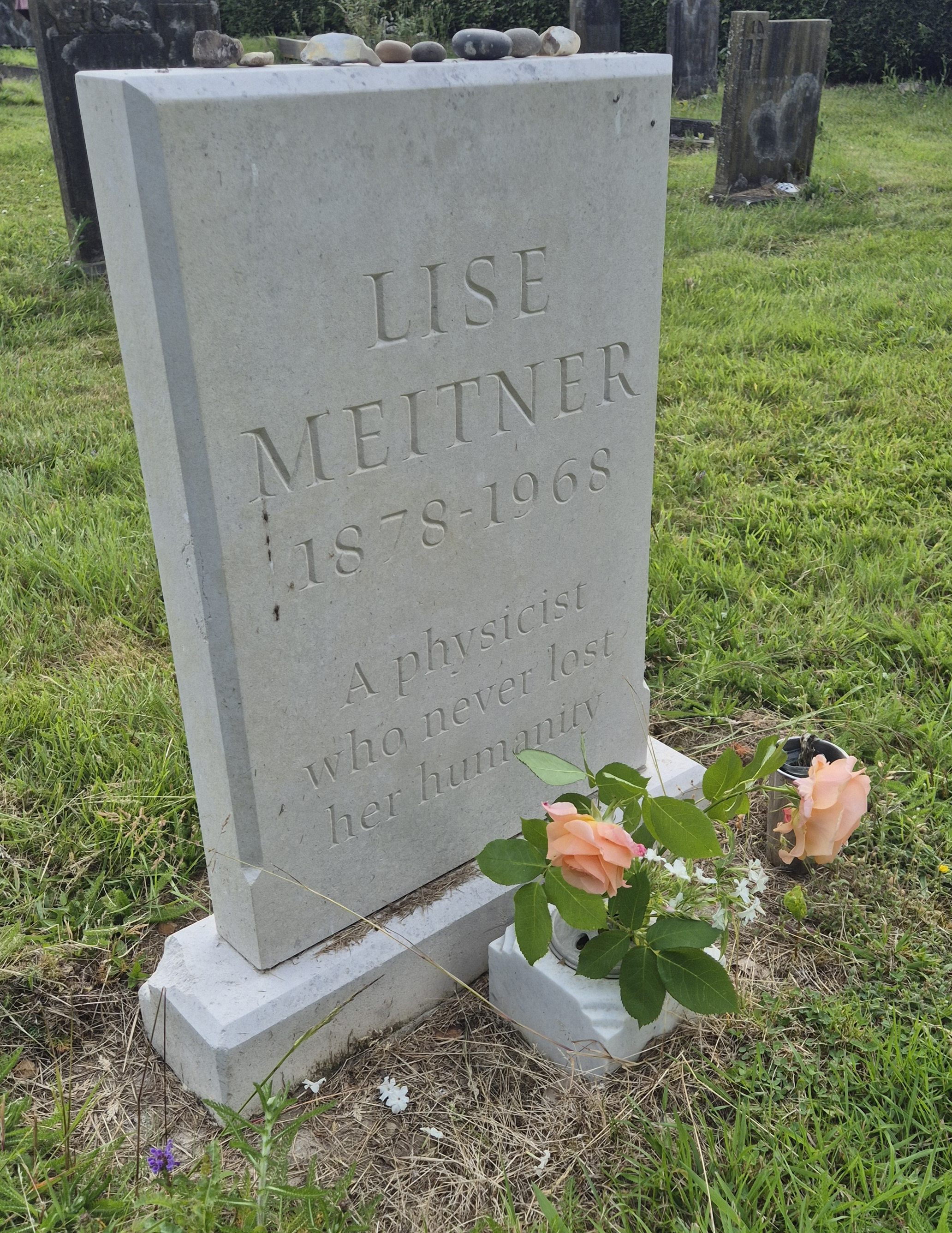
Meitner's grave in Bramley, Hampshire

A strenuous trip to the United States in 1964 led to Meitner having a heart attack, which she spent several months recovering from. Her physical and mental condition was weakened by atherosclerosis. After breaking her hip in a fall and suffering several small strokes in 1967, Meitner made a partial recovery, but was eventually weakened to the point where she had to move into a Cambridge nursing home. Meitner died in her sleep on 27 October 1968 at the age of 89. She was not informed of the deaths of Otto Hahn on 28 July 1968 or his wife Edith on 14 August, as her family believed it would be too much for someone so frail. As was her wish, she was buried in the village of Bramley in Hampshire, at St James parish church, close to her younger brother Walter, who had died in 1964. Her nephew Frisch composed the inscription on her headstone. It reads:

Lise Meitner: a physicist who never lost her humanity.

== Awards and honours ==
Meitner was praised by Albert Einstein as the "German Marie Curie". On her visit to the US in 1946, she received the honour "Woman of the Year" from the National Press Club and had dinner with the President of the United States, Harry S. Truman, at the Women's National Press Club. She received the Leibniz Medal from the Prussian Academy of Sciences in 1924, the Lieben Prize from the Austrian Academy of Sciences in 1925, the Ellen Richards Prize in 1928, the City of Vienna Prize for science in 1947, Max Planck Medal of the German Physical Society jointly with Hahn in 1949, the inaugural Otto Hahn Prize of the German Chemical Society in 1954, the Wilhelm Exner Medal in 1960, and in 1967, the Austrian Decoration for Science and Art.

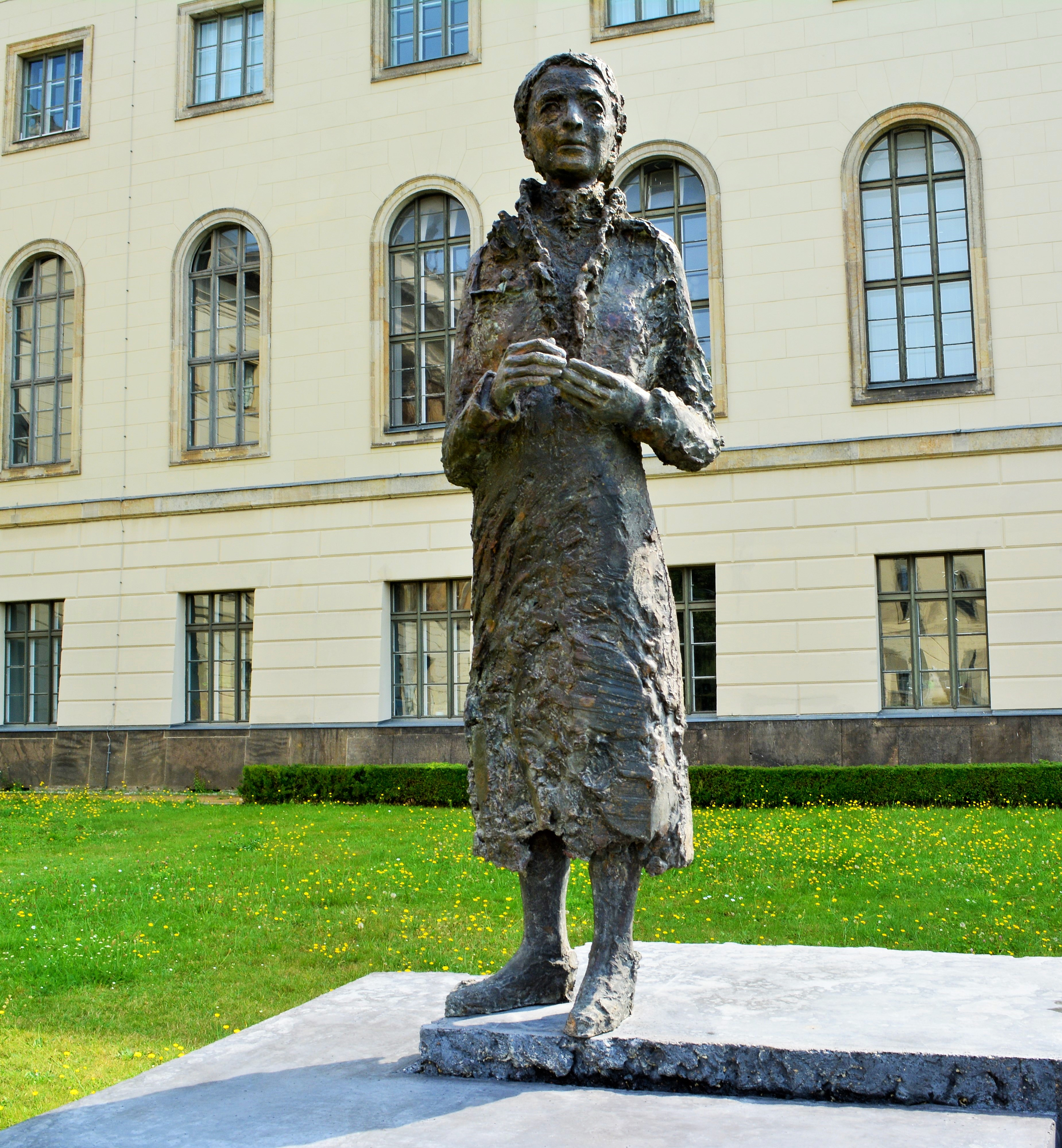
Statue of Meitner by Anna Franziska Schwarzbach at Humboldt University of Berlin

The President of Germany, Theodor Heuss, awarded Meitner the highest German order for scientists, the peace class of the Pour le Mérite in 1957, the same year as Hahn. Meitner became a foreign member of the Royal Swedish Academy of Sciences in 1945, and a full member in 1951, permitting her to participate in the Nobel Prize process. Four years later she was elected a Foreign Member of the Royal Society. She was also elected a Foreign Honorary Member of the American Academy of Arts and Sciences in 1960. She received honorary doctorates from Adelphi College, the University of Rochester, Rutgers University and Smith College in the United States, the Free University of Berlin in Germany, and the Stockholm University in Sweden.

In September 1966 the United States Atomic Energy Commission jointly awarded the Enrico Fermi Award to Hahn, Strassmann and Meitner for their discovery of fission. The ceremony was held in the Hofburg palace in Vienna. It was the first time that this prize had been awarded to non-Americans, and the first time it was presented to a woman. Meitner's diploma bore the words: "For pioneering research in the naturally occurring radioactivities and extensive experimental studies leading to the discovery of fission". Hahn's diploma was slightly different: "For pioneering research in the naturally occurring radioactivities and extensive experimental studies culminating in the discovery of fission." Hahn and Strassmann were present, but Meitner was too ill to attend, so Frisch accepted the award on her behalf. Glenn Seaborg, the discoverer of plutonium, presented it to her in the home of Max Perutz in Cambridge on 23 October 1966.

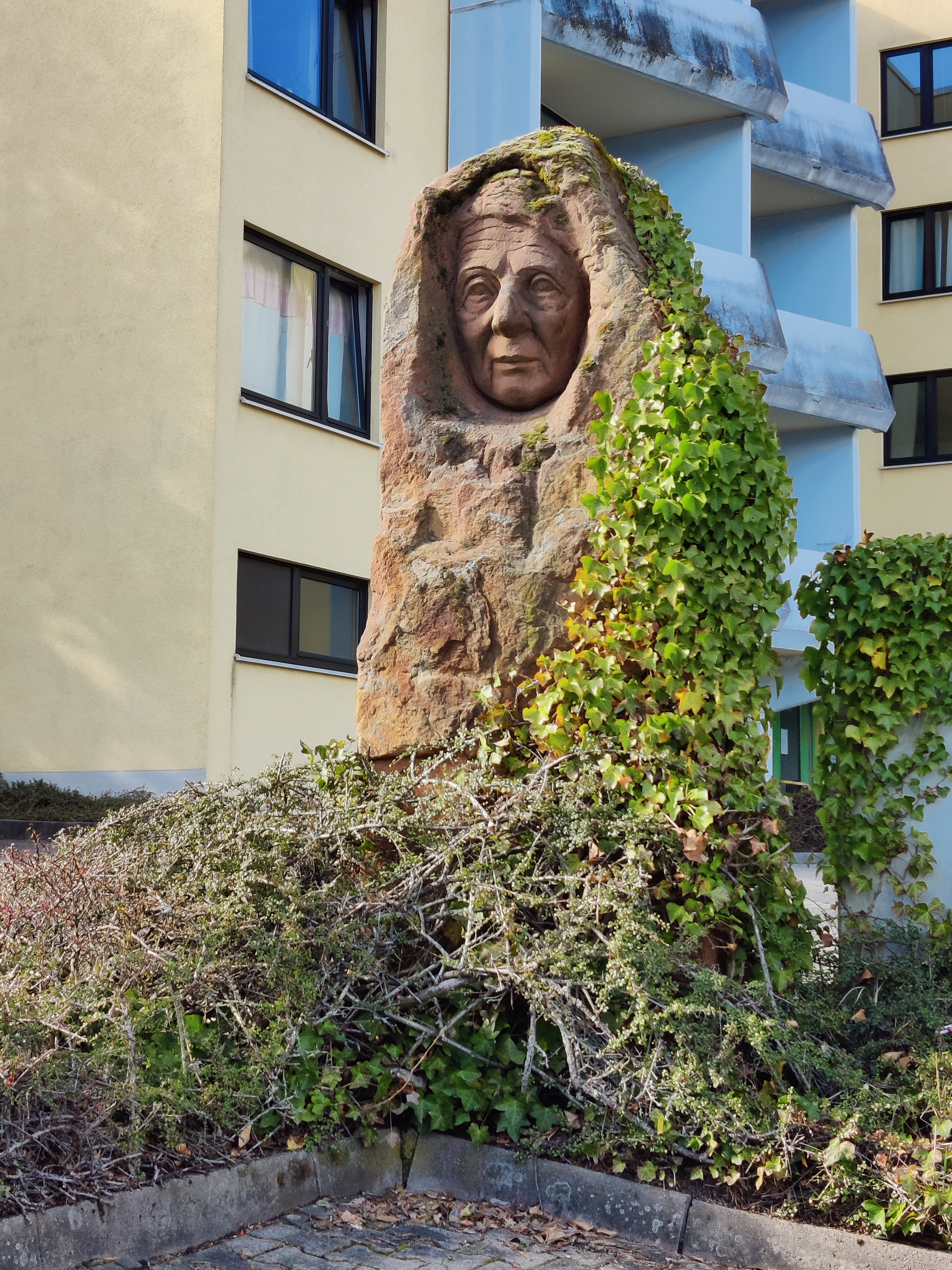
Lise Meitner memorial in front of the Lise Meitner dormitory in Kaiserslautern

After her death in 1968, Meitner received many naming honours. In 1997, element 109 was named meitnerium. She is the first and so far the only non-mythological woman thus exclusively honoured (since curium was named after both Marie and Pierre Curie). Additional naming honours are the Hahn–Meitner-Institut in Berlin, craters on the Moon and Venus, and the main-belt asteroid 6999 Meitner. In 2000, the European Physical Society established the biennial Lise Meitner Prize for excellent research in nuclear science. In 2006 the "Gothenburg Lise Meitner Award" was established by the University of Gothenburg and Chalmers University of Technology in Sweden; it is awarded annually to a scientist who has made a breakthrough in physics. In October 2010, the building at the Free University of Berlin that had once housed the KWI for Chemistry, and had been known as the Otto Hahn Building since 1956, was renamed the Hahn-Meitner Building, and in July 2014 a statue of Meitner was unveiled in the garden of the Humboldt University of Berlin next to similar statues of Hermann von Helmholtz and Max Planck.

Schools and streets were named after her in many cities in Austria and Germany, and a short residential street in Bramley, her resting place, is named Meitner Close. Since 2008 the Austrian Physical Society and the German Physical Society have organized the Lise Meitner Lectures, a series of annual public talks given by distinguished female physicists, and since 2015 the AlbaNova University Centre in Stockholm has had an annual Lise Meitner Distinguished Lecture. In 2016, the Institute of Physics in the UK established the Meitner Medal for public engagement within physics. In 2017, the Advanced Research Projects Agency-Energy in the United States named a major nuclear energy research program after her. On 6 November 2020, a satellite named after her (ÑuSat 16 or "Lise", COSPAR 2020-079H) was launched. The International Atomic Energy Agency named its library in her honour and established a programme to "provide early- and mid‑career women professionals with opportunities to participate in a multi-week visiting professional programme and advance their technical and soft skills".
