= Wilhelm Westphal =

German physicist

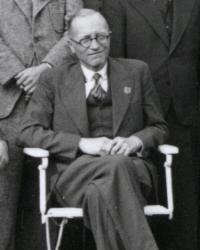
Wilhelm Westphal in Stuttgart (1935)

Wilhelm Heinrich Westphal (3 March 1882, in Hamburg – 5 June 1978, in Berlin) was a German physicist. From 1918, he was a professor at the Friedrich Wilhelm University of Berlin. During the period 1922 to 1924, he was also an expert adviser to the Prussian Ministry of Science, Arts and Culture. From 1928, he was simultaneously a professor at the Friedrich Wilhelm University of Berlin and at Technische Hochschule Berlin. His position at the former ended when it fell in the Russian sector at the close of World War II, but he achieved emeritus status at the latter in 1955 (by the time already known as Technische Universität Berlin).

== Education ==
Westphal was educated at the Gelehrtenschule des Johanneums. From 1902 to 1908, he studied at the University of Bonn, the Ludwig-Maximilians-Universität München, the University of Stuttgart, and the Friedrich Wilhelm University of Berlin, now the Humboldt University of Berlin. He received his doctorate in 1908, at the Friedrich Wilhelm University of Berlin, under Arthur Wehnelt with a thesis on measurements of potential in Wehnelt cylinders.

== Career ==
After receipt of his doctorate, Westphal became an assistant to Heinrich Rubens at the Friedrich Wilhelm University of Berlin, where he researched thermal radiation and electric discharges in gases. During his time there, Westphal completed his Habilitation (1913) and became a Privatdozent.

His academic career was interrupted from 1914 to 1918 by military service in World War I. Westphal became a titular professor after returning to the Friedrich Wilhelm University of Berlin in 1918, where he was appointed ausserordentlicher Professor (extraordinarius professor). From 1922 to 1924, he was also an expert adviser to the Preußisches Kultusministerium (PrKM, Prussian Culture Ministry, officially the Preußisches Ministerium für Wissenschaft, Kunst und Volksbildung).

From 1925 to 1926, he was a physics teacher at the Landschulheim in Salem. From 1928, he was head of the physics demonstrator, alternately called the student laboratory. In 1928, Westphal and Gustav Hertz together replaced Ferdinand Kurlbaum at the Technische Hochschule Berlin (now the Technische Universität Berlin). Westphal, however, still retained his position at the Friedrich Wilhelm University of Berlin. From 1934, he was simultaneously an ausserordentlicher Professor at the Technische Hochschule Berlin and the Friedrich Wilhelm University of Berlin.

From 1935, at the THB, he was substitute head of the physics department, which Hertz had been forced to vacate due to his Jewish background. His position at the Friedrich Wilhelm University of Berlin came to an end in 1945 at the close of World War II because it was then in the Russian sector of the city. In 1955, Westphal achieved emeritus status as ausserordentlicher Professor of physics at the Technische Universität Berlin.

In addition to being a successful researcher, Westphal was a prolific textbook author. He was also the editor of Volumes 12 through 17 of the Handbuch der Physik, of the encyclopedia Physikalisches Wörterbuch, and of the series Die Wissenschaft.

== Books by Westphal ==
- Wilhelm Westphal Physik – Ein Lehrbuch (Springer, 1928, 1937, 1944, 1947, 1953, 1956, 1969). This book was in at least 26 editions.
- Wilhelm Westphal Physikalisches Praktikum (Vieweg, 1938, 1943, 1966)
- Wilhelm Westphal Physik des alltäglichen Lebens (Societäts-Verlag, 1940)
- Wilhelm H. Westphal Atomenergie (West-Kulturverl., 1948)
- Wilhelm Westphal Die Relativitäts – Theorie (Kosmos Verlag, 1955)
- Wilhelm Westphal Die Relativitätstheorie. Ihre Grundtatsachen und ihre Bewährung als Wegweiser der Forschung. Kosmos Band 205 (Franckh'sche Verlagsbuchhandlung, 1955)
- Wilhelm Westphal Deine tägliche Physik (Ullstein, 1957, 1977, 1978)
- Wilhelm Westphal Kleines Lehrbuch der Physik: Ohne Andwendung höherer Mathematik (Springer, 1948, 1961, 1963, 1967). This book was favorably reviewed in the U.S.
  - Wilhelm Westphal A Short Textbook of Physics (Springer, 1968); translated from the 6th to 8th German editions. This book was reviewed favorably in the U.S.
- Wilhelm Westphal Physics For You and Me (Harrap, 1962)
- Wilhelm H. Westphal Physics can be fun (Hawthorn, 1962)
- Wilhelm Westphal Die Grundlagen des physikalischen Begriffssystems (Vieweg, 1965)
- Wilhelm Westphal, editor Die Wissenschaft / Einzeldarstellungen aus der Naturwissenschaft und der Technik Band 88 / Pascual Jordan die Physik des 20. Jahrhunderts (Vieweg)

== Selected literature by Westphal ==
- Wilhelm Westphal Probleme der Physik, Das Reich Number 41, 9–10 (10 October 1943)
- Wilhelm Westphal Physik begründet die Technik, Das Reich Number 6, 5–6, (6 February 1945)
- Wilhelm Westphal Das Physikalische Institut der Technische Universität Berlin, Physikalische Blätter Volume 11, 554–558 (1955)
- Wilhelm Westphal James Franck †, Physikalische Blätter Volume 20, 324–328 (1964)
- Wilhelm Westphal 68 Jahre als Physiker in Berlin, Physikalische Blätter Volume 28, 258–265 (1972)

== Bibliography ==
- Garbuny, Max (1979). "Wilhelm Westphal". Physics Today. 32 (1). AIP Publishing: 100. doi:10.1063/1.2995344. ISSN 0031-9228.
- Hentschel, Klaus (1996). Physics and National Socialism : an Anthology of Primary Sources. Basel: Springer Birkhäuser. ISBN 978-3-0348-0202-4. OCLC 913437590.
