= Peter Herbert Jensen =

German nuclear physicist (1913–1955)

Peter Herbert Jensen (28 November 1913 – 17 August 1955) was a German experimental nuclear physicist. During World War II, he worked on the German nuclear energy project, known as the Uranverein. After the war, he was a department director in the high-voltage section of the Max Planck Institute for Chemistry, in Mainz, and a supernumerary professor at the University of Mainz.

== Education ==
From 1932 to 1938, Jensen studied at the Universität Göttingen and the Albert-Ludwigs-Universität Freiburg. He received his doctorate in 1938, under Georg Joos at the University of Göttingen.

== Career ==
In 1938, Jensen was a volunteer in Walther Bothe's Institut für Physik at the Kaiser-Wilhelm Institut für medizinische Forschung (KWImF, Kaiser Wilhelm Institute for Medical Research, reorganized and renamed in 1948 the Max-Planck Institut für medizinische Forschung), in Heidelberg. He was a teaching assistant there to Walther Bothe from 1939 to 1946. During this time, Jensen worked on the German nuclear energy project, also known as the Uranverein (Uranium Club); his work with Walther Bothe, Arnold Flammersfeld, and Wolfgang Gentner appeared as Internal Reports in the Kernphysikalische Forschungsberichte (Research Reports in Nuclear Physics) . Jensen completed his Habilitation at the Ruprecht-Karls-Universität Heidelberg in 1943. The subject of his Habilitationsschrift was on nuclear cross sections of neutron scattering experiments conducted at the University of Heidelberg.

In the latter years of World War II, Berlin scientific organizations moved equipment and personnel out of the city to escape effects of Allied air raids. The Kaiser-Wilhelm Institut für Physik (KWIP, Kaiser Wilhelm Institute for Physics) had partly evacuated to Hechingen and Haigerloch in southern Germany. The Uranmaschine (nuclear reactor) B 8 (B-VIII) was constructed in Haigerloch. The construction of the reactor utilized 1.5 tons of heavy water, 1.5 tons of uranium, and 10 tons of graphite. The configuration was uranium in the form of cubes (40 chains of 9 cubes each and 38 chains of 8 cubes each) in heavy water surrounded by graphite. The report on the B 8 experiment was written by Fritz Bopp, Erich Fischer, Werner Heisenberg, and Karl Wirtz from the KWIP and Walther Bothe, Peter Jensen, and Oskar Ritter from the KWImF.

From 1946 to 1953, Jensen was Wolfgang Gentner’s teaching assistant at the University of Freiburg; from 1953 to 1954 he was a senior assistant there. From 1947 he was a lecturer, and from 1951 he was a supernumerary professor (nichtplanmäßiger Professor) focusing on the installation of a Van de Graaff generator for experiments in nuclear physics.

From 1954, he was a department director in the high-voltage section of the Max-Planck Institut für Chemie - Otto Hahn Institut, in Mainz, and he was a supernumerary professor at the Johannes Gutenberg-Universität Mainz.

== Internal reports ==
The following reports were published in Kernphysikalische Forschungsberichte (Research Reports in Nuclear Physics), an internal publication of the German Uranverein. The reports were classified Top Secret, they had very limited distribution, and the authors were not allowed to keep copies. The reports were confiscated under the Allied Operation Alsos and sent to the United States Atomic Energy Commission for evaluation. In 1971, the reports were declassified and returned to Germany. The reports are available at the Karlsruhe Nuclear Research Center and the American Institute of Physics.

- Arnold Flammersfeld, Peter Jensen, Wolfgang Gentner Die Energietönung der Uranspaltung G-25 (21 May 1940)
- Arnold Flammersfeld, Peter Jensen, Wolfgang Gentner Die Aufteilungsverhältnisse und Energietönung bei der Uranspaltung G-26 (24 September 1940)
- Walther Bothe and Peter Jensen Die Absorption thermischer Neutronen in Elektrogrphit G-71 (20 January 1941)
- Walther Bothe and Peter Jensen Resonanzeinfang an einer Uranoberfläche G-72 (12 May 1941)
- Peter Jensen Eine weitere Bestimmung des Absorptionsquerschnittes von 38 für thermische Neutronen G-98 (28 July 1941)

== Selected bibliography ==
- Bothe, W.; Jensen, P. (1944). "Die Absorption thermischer Neutronen in Kohlenstoff". Zeitschrift für Physik (in German). 122 (9–12). Springer Science and Business Media LLC: 749–755. Bibcode:1944ZPhy..122..749B. doi:10.1007/bf01330635. ISSN 1434-6001. S2CID 120872327. Institutional affiliation: Institut für Physik am Kaiser Wilhelm-Institut für medizinische Forschung, Heidelberg. (As cited in Hentschel and Hentschel, 1996, 370n43, this paper has a footnote stating that the paper was written in July 1940.)
- Jensen, Peter (1944). "Die Bremsung von Neutronen in Kohlenstoff, Wasser und schwerem Wasser". Zeitschrift für Physik (in German). 122 (9–12). Springer Science and Business Media LLC: 756–768. Bibcode:1944ZPhy..122..756J. doi:10.1007/bf01330636. ISSN 1434-6001. S2CID 122262972. Institutional affiliation: Institut für Physik am Kaiser Wilhelm-Institut für medizinische Forschung, Heidelberg. (As cited in Hentschel and Hentschel, 1996, 366n24, this paper has a footnote stating that the paper was written in July 1940.)
- Steinwedel, Helmut; Jensen, J. Hans D.; Jensen, Peter (1950-09-15). "Nuclear Dipole Vibrations". Physical Review. 79 (6). American Physical Society (APS): 1019. Bibcode:1950PhRv...79Q1019S. doi:10.1103/physrev.79.1019. ISSN 0031-899X. Institutional affiliations: Steinwedel and J. H. D. Jensen - Institut für theoretische Physik, Universität Heidelberg and Peter Jensen - Physikalisches Institut, Universität Freiburg. Received 10 July 1950.
