= Oskar Ritter =

German physicist (born 1913)

Oskar Ritter (born 1913, date of death unknown) was a German physicist. During World War II, he worked on the German nuclear energy project, also known as the Uranium Club.

== Education ==
Ritter studied at the Julius-Maximilians-Universität Würzburg and the Universität Leipzig. In 1943, he received his doctorate in physics under Robert Döpel at Leipzig.

== Career ==
Ritter worked on the German nuclear energy project, also known as the Uranverein.

In the latter years of World War II, Berlin scientific organizations moved equipment and personnel out of the city to escape effects of Allied air raids. The Kaiser-Wilhelm Institut für Physik (KWIP, Kaiser Wilhelm Institute for Physics, today, the Max-Planck Institut für Physik) had partly evacuated to Hechingen and Haigerloch in southern Germany. The Uranmaschine (nuclear reactor) B 8 (B-VIII) was constructed in Haigerloch. The construction of the reactor utilized 1.5 tons of heavy water, 1.5 tons of uranium, and 10 tons of graphite. The configuration was uranium in the form of cubes (40 chains of 9 cubes each and 38 chains of 8 cubes each) in heavy water surrounded by graphite. The report on the B 8 experiment was written by Fritz Bopp, Erich Fischer, Werner Heisenberg, and Karl Wirtz from the KWIP and Walther Bothe, Peter Herbert Jensen, and Oskar Ritter from the Institut für Physik (Institute for Physics) of the Kaiser-Wilhelm Institut für medizinische Forschung (KWImF, Kaiser Wilhelm Institute for Medical Research), in Heidelberg.

== Internal reports ==
The following report was published in Kernphysikalische Forschungsberichte (Research Reports in Nuclear Physics), an internal publication of the German Uranverein. The reports were classified Top Secret, they had very limited distribution, and the authors were not allowed to keep copies. The reports were confiscated under the Allied Operation Alsos and sent to the United States Atomic Energy Commission for evaluation. In 1971, the reports were declassified and returned to Germany. The reports are available at the Karlsruhe Nuclear Research Center and the American Institute of Physics.

- Fritz Bopp, Walther Bothe, Erich Fischer, Erwin Fünfer, Werner Heisenberg, O. Ritter, and Karl Wirtz Bericht über einen Versuch mit 1.5 to D_{2}O und U und 40 cm Kohlerückstreumantel (B7) G-300 (3 January 1945)

== Bibliography ==
- Hentschel, Klaus (Editor) and Ann M. Hentschel (Editorial Assistant and Translator) Physics and National Socialism: An Anthology of Primary Sources (Birkhäuser, 1996)
- Walker, Mark German National Socialism and the Quest for Nuclear Power 1939–1949 (Cambridge, 1993) ISBN 0-521-43804-7
