= Arnold Flammersfeld =

German physicist (1913–2001)

Arnold Rudolf Karl Flammersfeld (February 10, 1913 – January 5, 2001) was a German nuclear physicist who worked on the German nuclear energy project during World War II. From 1954, he was a professor of physics at the University of Göttingen.

== Education ==
From 1931 to 1937, Flammersfeld studied physics at the Friedrich-Wilhelms University (in 1949 renamed Humboldt University of Berlin); he was a student of Lise Meitner and he received his doctorate in 1938.

== Career ==
From 1937, Flammersfeld was a Mitarbeiter (staff assistant) to Meitner at the Kaiser-Wilhelm Institut für Chemie (KWIC, after World War II reorganized and renamed the Max Planck Institute for Chemistry), in Berlin-Dahlem. From 1939 to 1941, he was a staff scientist at Walther Bothe's Institut für Physik at the Kaiser-Wilhelm Institut für medizinische Forschung (KWImF, Kaiser Wilhelm Institute for Medical Research, reorganized and renamed in 1948 the Max-Planck Institut für medizinische Forschung), in Heidelberg. Bothe and his staff conducted the main effort under the German nuclear energy project to measure various nuclear constants, such as the energy of fission neutrons, the energy distribution of fission fragments, the ratio of neutrons liberated to neutrons absorbed in uranium, and neutron cross sections. While at the KWImF, he worked with Bothe on these matters and published classified reports (see below, the Internal Reports section). From 1941, he was employed at the KWIC.

In 1947, Flammersfeld completed his Habilitation at the Eberhard Karls University of Tübingen and then from 1948 a Privatdozent there. He also worked on installing the electrostatic generator at Tailfingen. From 1949, he was a Privatdozent at the Johannes Gutenberg University of Mainz. From 1954 he was an ordinarius professor at the Georg-August University of Göttingen.

== Internal reports ==
The following reports were published in Kernphysikalische Forschungsberichte (Research Reports in Nuclear Physics), an internal publication of the German Uranverein. The reports were classified Top Secret, they had very limited distribution, and the authors were not allowed to keep copies. The reports were confiscated under the Allied Operation Alsos and sent to the United States Atomic Energy Commission for evaluation. In 1971, the reports were declassified and returned to Germany. The reports are available at the Karlsruhe Nuclear Research Center and the American Institute of Physics.

- Arnold Flammersfeld, Peter Jensen, Wolfgang Gentner Die Energietönung der Uranspaltung G-25 (21 May 1940)
- Arnold Flammersfeld, Peter Jensen, Wolfgang Gentner Die Aufteilungsverhältnisse und Energietönung bei der Uranspaltung G-26 (24 September 1940)
- Walther Bothe and Arnold Flammersfeld Die Wirkungsquerschnitte von 38 für thermische Neutronen aus Diffusionsmessungen G-67 (20 January 1941)
- Walther Bothe and Arnold Flammersfeld Resonanzeinfang an einer Uranberfläche G-68 (8 March 1940)
- Walther Bothe and Arnold Flammersfeld Messungen an einem Gemisch von 38-Oxyd und –Wasser; der Vermehrungsfakto K unde der Resonanzeinfang w. G-69 (26 May 1941)
- Walther Bothe and Arnold Flammersfeld Die Neutronenvermehrung bei schnellen und langsamen Neutronen in 38 und die Diffusionslänge in 38 Metall und Wasser G-70 (11 July 1941)
- Walther Bothe and Arnold Flammersfeld Versuche mit einer Schichtenanordnung von Wasser und Präp 38 G-74 (28 April 1941)

== Selected bibliography ==
=== Books ===
- Josef Mattauch and Arnold Flammersfeld Isotopenbericht : tabellarische Übersicht der Eigenschaften der Atomkerne, soweit bis Ende 1948 bekannt (Naturforschung, 1949)
- Arnold Flammersfeld Probleme der heutigen Atomphysik (Vandenhoeck & Ruprecht, 1962)
- Karl Bechert, Christian Gerthsen, and Arnold Flammersfeld Atomphysik. III. Theorie des Atombaus 1. Teil (De Gruyter, Berlin, 1963)
- Karl Bechert, Christian Gerthsen, and Arnold Flammersfeld Atomphysik. Bd. IV. Theorie des Atombaus 2. Teil (De Gruyter, Berlin, 1963)
- Friedrich Beck, Arnold Flammersfeld, Otto R Frisch, Armin Hermann, Eugene O Wigner and Karl E Zimen Gedachtnisausstellung Zum 100. Geburtstag von Albert Einstein, Otto Hahn, Max von Laue, Lisa Meitner (Max Planck Gesellschaft zur Forderung der Wissenschaften, 1979)

=== Articles ===
- Arnold Flammersfeld Isomere zu stabilen Kernen bei Rhodium und Silber, Zeitschrift für Naturforschung Band 1, Heft 1, 3-10 (1946)
