= Erich Fischer =

German physicist (1910–1969)

Erich Horst Fischer (3 July 1910, Allenstein, East Prussia – 1969) was a German experimental physicist. He worked at the Kaiser Wilhelm Institute for Physics (KWIP) and contributed to the German nuclear energy project, also known as the Uranium Club. After World War II, he helped rebuild the KWIP branch at Hechingen, was a professor at the University of Tübingen and Ankara University, and then a research scientist for the German firm GKSS.

== Education ==
From 1929 to 1935, Fischer studied at the University of Bonn, the Ludwig-Maximilians-Universität München, and the Friedrich Wilhelm University of Berlin. He received his doctorate at the Friedrich Wilhelm University of Berlin under Walther Nernst and A. Deubner.

== Career ==
After receipt of his doctorate, Fischer was a teaching assistant to W. Friedrich at the Friedrich Wilhelm University of Berlin from 1935 to 1936. In 1937, he became an assistant under Peter Debye and Werner Heisenberg at the Kaiser-Wilhelm Institut für Physik (KWIP, Kaiser Wilhelm Institute for Physics) in Berlin-Dahlem; today, the KWIP is known as the Max Planck Institute for Physics). He completed his Habilitation in 1939, and he then also became a Privatdozent at the Friedrich Wilhelm University of Berlin in 1942.

During World War II, Fischer worked in the German nuclear energy project, also known as the Uranverein (Uranium Club). His contributions included determination of the rate of neutron multiplication in heterogeneous uranium-moderator combinations.

In the latter years of World War II, Berlin scientific organizations moved equipment and personnel out of the city to escape effects of Allied air raids. The KWIP had partly evacuated to Hechingen and Haigerloch in southern Germany. The Uranmaschine (nuclear reactor) B 8 (B-VIII) was constructed in Haigerloch. The construction of the reactor utilized 1.5 tons of heavy water, 1.5 tons of uranium, and 10 tons of graphite. The configuration was uranium in the form of cubes (40 chains of 9 cubes each and 38 chains of 8 cubes each) in heavy water surrounded by graphite. The report on the B 8 experiment was written by Fritz Bopp, Erich Fischer, Werner Heisenberg, and Karl Wirtz from the KWIP and Walther Bothe, Peter Herbert Jensen, and Oskar Ritter from the Institut für Physik (Institute for Physics) of the Kaiser-Wilhelm Institut für medizinische Forschung (KWImF, Kaiser Wilhelm Institute for Medical Research), in Heidelberg. Fischer, and to a lesser extent Bopp, were found by blood tests to have suffered damage from neutron radiation exposure.

After 1945, Fischer helped to rebuild the Hechingen branch of the KWIP. In 1948, Fischer transferred to the University of Tübingen and became a lecturer on experimental physics; in 1950, he became a nichtplanmäßiger Professor (supernumerary professor) there. In 1956, he became a full professor at the Ankara University. From 1956, he was employed at the newly founded German firm GKSS, where he conducted research for the construction of nuclear reactors.

== Internal Reports ==
The following reports were published in Kernphysikalische Forschungsberichte (Research Reports in Nuclear Physics), an internal publication of the German Uranverein. The reports were classified Top Secret, they had very limited distribution, and the authors were not allowed to keep copies. The reports were confiscated under the Allied Operation Alsos and sent to the United States Atomic Energy Commission for evaluation. In 1971, the reports were declassified and returned to Germany. The reports are available at the Karlsruhe Nuclear Research Center and the American Institute of Physics.

- Erich Fischer Bestimmung des Absorptionsquerschnittes von Uran für langsame Neutronen G-79 (26 June 1941)
- Fritz Bopp, Erich Fischer, Werner Heisenberg, Carl Friedrich von Weizsäcker, and Karl Wirtz Untersuchungen mit neuen Schichtenanordnungen aus U-metall und Paraffin G-127 (March 1942)
- Werner Heisenberg, Fritz Bopp, Erich Fischer, Carl Friedrich von Weizsäcker, and Karl Wirtz Messungen an Schichtenanordnungen aus 38-Metall und Paraffin G-162 (30 October 1942)
- Fritz Bopp and Erich Fischer Einfluss des Rückstrumantels auf die Neutronenausbeute des U-Brenners G-249.
- Fritz Bopp, Walther Bothe, Erich Fischer, Erwin Fünfer, Werner Heisenberg, O. Ritter, and Karl Wirtz Bericht über einen Versuch mit 1.5 to D_{2}O und U und 40 cm Kohlerückstreumantel (B7) G-300 (3 January 1945)

== Bibliography ==
- Hentschel, Klaus (Editor) and Ann M. Hentschel (Editorial Assistant and Translator) Physics and National Socialism: An Anthology of Primary Sources (Birkhäuser, 1996)
- Walker, Mark German National Socialism and the Quest for Nuclear Power 1939–1949 (Cambridge, 1993) ISBN 0-521-43804-7
