= Friedrich Bopp =

German physicist (1909–1987)

- Born: 27 December 1909; Frankfurt, German Empire
- Died: 14 November 1987 (aged 77); Munich, West Germany
- Education: University of Göttingen
- Scientific career
- Fields: Theoretical physics
- Workplaces: Kaiser-Wilhelm Institut für Physik; Ludwig-Maximilians-Universität München
- Doctoral advisor: Fritz Sauter
- Doctoral students: Friedrich L. Bauer; Rudolf Haag; Klaus Samelson; Gustav Max Obermair

Friedrich Arnold "Fritz" Bopp (27 December 1909 – 14 November 1987) was a German theoretical physicist who contributed to nuclear physics and quantum field theory. He worked at the Kaiser-Wilhelm Institut für Physik and with the Uranverein. He was a professor at the Ludwig-Maximilians-Universität München and a President of the Deutsche Physikalische Gesellschaft. He signed the Göttingen Manifesto.

== Education ==
From 1929 to 1934, Bopp studied physics at the Goethe University Frankfurt and the University of Göttingen. He completed his Diplom thesis in 1933 under the mathematician Hermann Weyl. In 1934, he became an Assistant (Assistant) at Göttingen. In 1937, Bopp completed his doctorate on the subject of Compton scattering under the physicist Fritz Sauter. From 1936 to 1941, he was a teaching assistant at Breslau University. In 1941, Bopp completed his Habilitationsschrift under Erwin Fues on the subject of a consistent field theory of the electron.

== Career ==
From 1941 to 1947, Bopp was a staff scientist at the Kaiser-Wilhelm Institut für Physik (KWIP, after World War II reorganized and renamed the Max Planck Institute for Physics), located in Berlin-Dahlem. He worked on the German nuclear energy project; collaborators on aspects of this project were for a time known collectively as the Uranverein (Uranium Club). In 1944, when most of the KWIP was evacuated to Hechingen in Southern Germany due to air raids on Berlin, he went there too, and he was the Institute’s Deputy Director there. When the American Alsos Mission evacuated Hechingen and Haigerloch, near the end of World War II, French armed forces occupied Hechingen. Bopp did not get along with them and described the initial French policy objectives towards the KWIP as exploitation, forced evacuation to France, and seizure of documents and equipment. In order to put pressure on Bopp to evacuate the KWIP to France, the French Naval Commission imprisoned him for five days and threatened him with further imprisonment if he did not cooperate in the evacuation. During his imprisonment, the spectroscopist Hermann Schüler, who had a better relationship with the French, persuaded the French to appoint him as Deputy Director of the KWIP. This incident caused tension between the physicists and spectroscopists at the KWIP and within its umbrella organization the Kaiser-Wilhelm Gesellschaft (Kaiser Wilhelm Society).

From 1946 to 1947, Bopp was also a teaching assistant at the University of Tübingen.

From 1947 to 1950, Bopp was an extraordinarius professor and in 1950 an ordinarius professor of theoretical physics at the Institute of Theoretical Physics of the Ludwig-Maximilians-Universität München. His main area of interest was quantum field theory. In 1954, he was a member of the board of trustees of the Institute.

During 1956 and 1957, Bopp was a member of the Arbeitskreis Kernphysik (Nuclear Physics Working Group) of the Fachkommission II „Forschung und Nachwuchs“ (Commission II “Research and Growth”) of the Deutschen Atomkommission (DAtK, German Atomic Energy Commission). Other members of the Nuclear Physics Working Group in both 1956 and 1957 were: Werner Heisenberg (chairman), Hans Kopfermann (vice-chairman), Walther Bothe, Wolfgang Gentner, Otto Haxel, Willibald Jentschke, Heinz Maier-Leibnitz, Josef Mattauch, Wolfgang Riezler, Wilhelm Walcher, and Carl Friedrich von Weizsäcker. Wolfgang Paul was also a member of the group during 1957.

From 1964 to 1965, Bopp was the President of the Deutsche Physikalische Gesellschaft.

Bopp was one of the 18 signers of the Göttinger Manifest in 1957, which was opposed to the rearming of Germany with nuclear weapons.

The great theoretical physicist, Arnold Sommerfeld, who educated and nurtured a new generation of physicists in the 1920s and 1930s, expanded his lecture notes into the six-volume Vorlesungen über theoretische Physik (Lectures on Theoretical Physics). Sommerfeld died in 1951 as the result of a traffic accident while walking with his grandchildren. He had published all but Volume 5 of his lectures. Bopp and Josef Meixner edited and completed this volume and put it into publication. Bopp and Meixner also edited and supplemented other volumes in the series and published new editions of volumes within the series.

== Bibliography ==
=== Internal reports ===
The following reports were published in Kernphysikalische Forschungsberichte (Research Reports in Nuclear Physics), an internal publication of the German Uranverein. The reports were classified "Geheime Reichssache" ("secret", the highest German classification level at the time), they had very limited distribution, and the authors were not allowed to keep copies. The reports were confiscated under the Allied Operation Alsos and sent to the United States Atomic Energy Commission for evaluation. In 1971, the reports were declassified and returned to Germany. The reports were available at the library of the Karlsruhe Nuclear Research Center and at the American Institute of Physics. In 1978, the Karlsruhe documents were transferred to the Deutsches Museum, where they are now available in digital form.

- Fritz Bopp, Erich Fischer, Werner Heisenberg, Carl-Friedrich von Weizsäcker, and Karl Wirtz, Vorläufiger Bericht über Ergebnisse an einer Schichtenkugel aus 38-Metall und Paraffin, Nutzbarmachung von Atomkernenergien. Geheime Forschungsberichte, Heft 1, G-126 (6 January 1942)
- Fritz Bopp, Erich Fischer, Werner Heisenberg, Carl-Friedrich von Weizsäcker, and Karl Wirtz, Untersuchungen mit neuen Schichtenanordnungen aus U-metall und Paraffin, Nutzbarmachung von Atomkernenergien. Geheime Forschungsberichte, Heft 3 (Arbeitstagung vom 26. bis 28. Februar 1942), G-127 (March 1942)
- Werner Heisenberg, Fritz Bopp, Erich Fischer, Carl-Friedrich von Weizsäcker, and Karl Wirtz, Messungen an Schichtenanordnungen aus 38-Metall und Paraffin, Nutzbarmachung von Atomkernenergien. Geheime Forschungsberichte, Heft 5, G-162 (30 October 1942)
- Fritz Bopp and Erich Fischer, Einfluss des Rückstreumantels auf die Neutronenausbeute des U-Brenners, Kernphysikalische Forschungsberichte, March 1944, G-249 (10 January 1944).
- Fritz Bopp, Walther Bothe, Erich Fischer, Erwin Fünfer, Werner Heisenberg, Oskar Ritter, and Karl Wirtz, Bericht über einen Versuch mit 1.5 to D_{2}O und U und 40 cm Kohlerückstreumantel. (B7), G-300 (3 January 1945)

=== Books ===
- Fritz Bopp and Oswald Riedel, Die physikalische Entwicklung der Quantentheorie (Schwab, 1950)
- Fritz Bopp, Das Korrespondenzprinzip bei korpuskular-statistischer Auffassung der Quantenmechanik (Verl. d. Bayer. Akad. d. Wissensch., 1955)
- Fritz Bopp and Eduard Degen, Lasset euch versöhnen mit Gott (Eichenkreuz-Verl., 1956)
- Fritz Bopp and Detlef Laugwitz, Lorentzinvariante Wellengleichungen für Mehrbahnsysteme (C.H. Beck Verlag, 1958)
- Fritz Bopp, Eine Spinorfeldtheorie im explizite relativistisch invarianten Schrödingerbild (C.H. Beck Verlag, 1975)
- Fritz Bopp, Über die Einheit der klassischen Physik (C.H. Beck Verlag, 1984)

=== Edited and supplemented books ===
- Arnold Sommerfeld, Thermodynamik und Statistik - Vorlesungen über theoretische Physik Band 5 Herausgegeben von Fritz Bopp und Josef Meixner. (Diederich sche Verlagsbuchhandlung, 1952)
  - Arnold Sommerfeld, edited by F. Bopp and J. Meixner, and translated by J. Kestin, Thermodynamics and Statistical Mechanics - Lectures on Theoretical Physics Volume V (Academic Press, 1964)
- Arnold Sommerfeld, edited and supplemented by F. Bopp and Josef Meixner, Vorlesungen über theoretische Physik. Band 2: Optik. 2. Auflage (Akademische Verlagsgesellschaft, 1959)
- Arnold Sommerfeld, edited and supplemented by Fritz Bopp and Josef Meixner, Vorlesungen über theoretische Physik. Band 3: Elektrodynamik. 3. Auflage (Akademische Verlagsgesellschaft, 1961)
- Fritz Bopp (editor), Werner Heisenberg Und Die Physik Unserer Zeit (Friedr. Vieweg & Sohn, Braunschweig, 1961)
- Arnold Sommerfeld, edited and supplemented by Fritz Bopp and Josef Meixner, Vorlesungen über theoretische Physik. Band 5: Thermodynamik und Statistik. 2. Auflage (Akademische Verlagsgesellschaft, 1962)
- Arnold Sommerfeld, edited and supplemented by Fritz Bopp and Josef Meixner, Vorlesungen über theoretische Physik. Band 4: Optik. 3. Auflage (Akademische Verlagsgesellschaft, 1964)
- Arnold Sommerfeld, edited and supplemented by Fritz Bopp and Josef Meixner, Vorlesungen über theoretische Physik. Band 5: Thermodynamik und Statistik. 3. Auflage (Akademische Verlagsgesellschaft, 1965)
- Arnold Sommerfeld, edited and supplemented by Fritz Bopp and Josef Meixner, Vorlesungen über theoretische Physik. Band 3: Elektrodynamik. 5. Auflage (Akademische Verlagsgesellschaft, 1967)

=== Research papers ===
- Arnold Sommerfeld and Fritz Bopp, Zum Problem der Maxwellschen Spannungen, Annalen der Physik, Volume 8, 41-45 (1950)
- Arnold Sommerfeld and Fritz Bopp, Fifty years of quantum theory, Science, Volume 113, 85-92 (1951)
