= Werner Heisenberg =

German physicist (1901–1976)

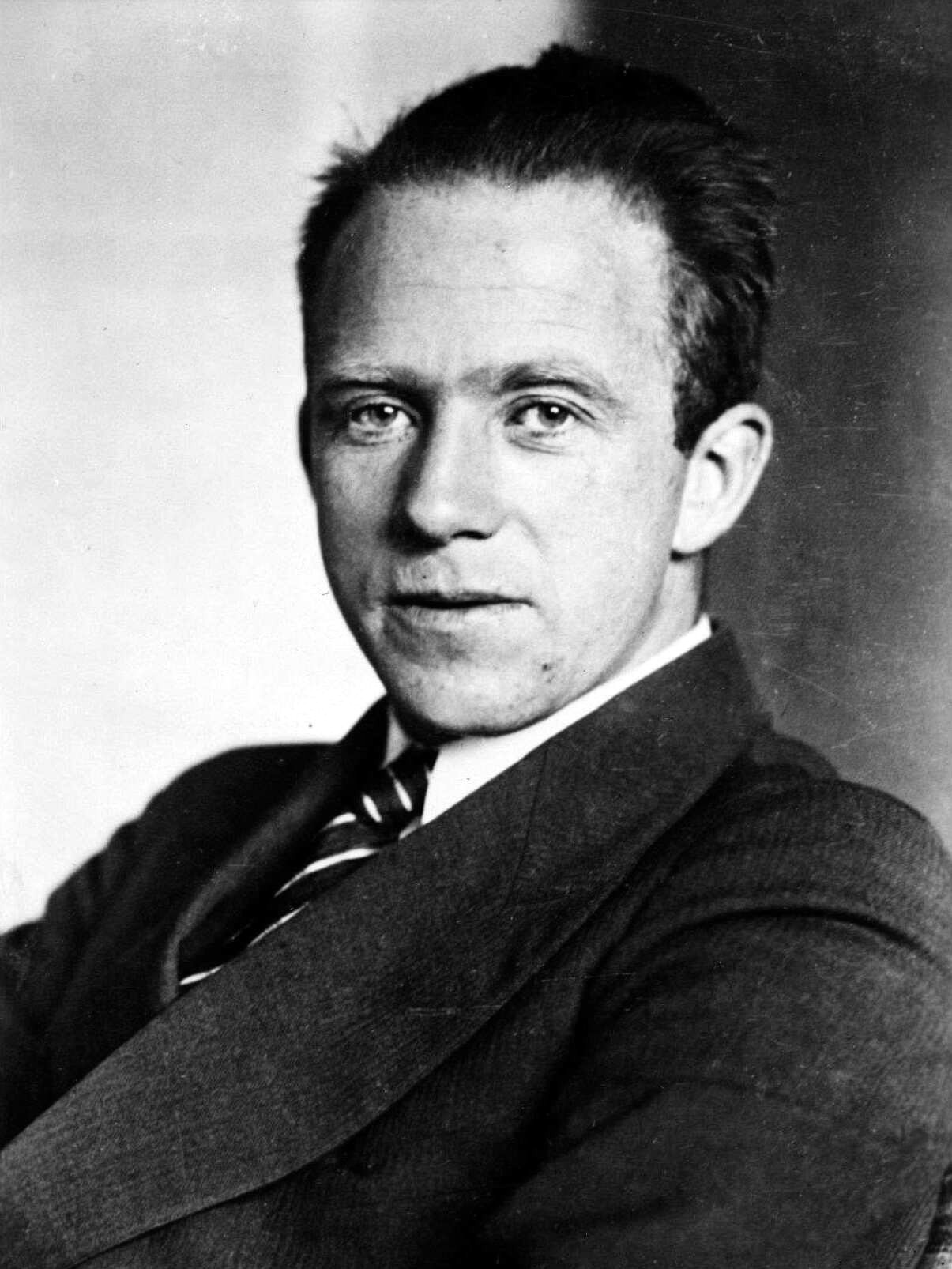
- Heisenberg in 1933
- Born: Werner Karl Heisenberg; 5 December 1901; Würzburg, German Empire
- Died: 1 February 1976 (aged 74); Munich, West Germany
- Resting place: Munich Waldfriedhof
- Education: Ludwig-Maximilians-Universität München (grad. 1923); University of Göttingen (grad. 1924)
- Known for: See list: Heisenberg cut; Heisenberg group; Heisenberg model (classical); Heisenberg model (quantum); Heisenberg picture; Heisenberg's microscope; Heisenberg–Langevin equations; Kramers–Heisenberg formula; Euler–Heisenberg Lagrangian; C*-algebra; Canonical commutation relation; Copenhagen interpretation; Isospin; Matrix mechanics; Exchange interaction; Optical theorem; Quantum field theory; Quantum fluctuation; Quantum spacetime; Proton–neutron model of the nucleus; Resonance (chemistry); S-matrix; Spin isomers of hydrogen; Uncertainty principle; Vacuum polarization; Wave function collapse; Umdeutung paper; Uranprojekt
- Spouse: Elisabeth Schumacher (m. 1937)
- Children: 7, including Jochen and Martin
- Awards: Matteucci Medal (1929); Barnard Medal for Meritorious Service to Science (1930); Nobel Prize in Physics (1932); Max Planck Medal (1933); Niels Bohr International Gold Medal (1970)
- Scientific career
- Fields: Physics
- Workplaces: University of Göttingen; Leipzig University; Friedrich Wilhelm University of Berlin; Ludwig-Maximilians-Universität München
- Thesis: Über Stabilität und Turbulenz von Flüssigkeitsströmen (1923)
- Doctoral advisor: Arnold Sommerfeld
- Other academic advisors: Max Born
- Doctoral students: See list: Erich Bagge; Felix Bloch; Hans Heinrich Euler; Hermann Arthur Jahn; Fazley Bary Malik; Peter Mittelstaedt; Reinhard Oehme; Rudolf Peierls; Ivan Supek; Edward Teller; Șerban Țițeica; Friedwardt Winterberg
- Other notable students: See list: Guido Beck; Ugo Fano; William Vermillion Houston; Ettore Majorana; Arnold Nordsieck; Edwin Albrecht Uehling; Herbert Wagner; Gian Carlo Wick; Alan Herries Wilson

Werner Karl Heisenberg (/ˈhaɪzənbɜːrɡ/; German: [ˈvɛʁnɐ ˈhaɪzn̩bɛʁk]; 5 December 1901 – 1 February 1976) was a German theoretical physicist, one of the main pioneers of the theory of quantum mechanics and a principal scientist in the German nuclear program during World War II.

Heisenberg published his Umdeutung paper in 1925, a major reinterpretation of old quantum theory. In the subsequent series of papers with Max Born and Pascual Jordan, during the same year, his matrix formulation of quantum mechanics was substantially elaborated. He is known for the uncertainty principle, which he published in 1927. He received the Nobel Prize in Physics in 1932 "for the creation of quantum mechanics". (Note: Heisenberg's work on quantum physics was preceded by a quarter century of research by other authors on the old quantum theory.)

Heisenberg also made contributions to the theories of the hydrodynamics of turbulent flows, the atomic nucleus, ferromagnetism, cosmic rays, and subatomic particles. He introduced the concept of a wave function collapse. He was also instrumental in planning the first West German nuclear reactor at the Kernforschungszentrum Karlsruhe, together with one in Garching at the Technische Hochschule München, in 1957 (both were research reactors).

Following World War II, Heisenberg was appointed Director of the Kaiser Wilhelm Institute for Physics, which soon thereafter was renamed the Max Planck Institute for Physics. He was director until it was moved to Munich in 1958. He was Director of the Max Planck Institute for Physics and Astrophysics from 1960 to 1970.

Heisenberg was also President of the German Research Council, Chairman of the Commission for Atomic Physics, Chairman of the Nuclear Physics Working Group, and President of the Alexander von Humboldt Foundation.

== Early life and education ==
=== Early years ===
Werner Karl Heisenberg was born in Würzburg, Germany, the son of Kaspar Ernst August Heisenberg and Annie Wecklein. His father was a secondary school teacher of classical languages who became Germany's only ordentlicher Professor (ordinarius professor) of medieval and modern Greek studies in the university system.

Heisenberg was raised and lived as a Lutheran Christian. In his late teenage years, Heisenberg read Plato's Timaeus while hiking in the Bavarian Alps. He recounted philosophical conversations with his fellow students and teachers about understanding the atom while receiving his scientific training at the Ludwig-Maximilians-Universität München, the University of Göttingen, and the University of Copenhagen. Heisenberg later stated that "My mind was formed by studying philosophy, Plato and that sort of thing" and that "Modern physics has definitely decided in favor of Plato. In fact the smallest units of matter are not physical objects in the ordinary sense; they are forms, ideas which can be expressed unambiguously only in mathematical language".

In 1919, Heisenberg arrived in Munich as a member of the Freikorps to fight the Bavarian Soviet Republic established a year earlier. Five decades later he recalled those days as youthful fun, like "playing cops and robbers and so on; it was nothing serious at all"; his duties were restricted to "seizing bicycles or typewriters from 'red' administrative buildings", and guarding suspected "red" prisoners.

=== University studies ===
Heisenberg in 1924

From 1920 to 1923, he studied physics and mathematics at the Ludwig-Maximilians-Universität München under Arnold Sommerfeld and Wilhelm Wien and at the University of Göttingen with Max Born and James Franck and mathematics with David Hilbert. He received his doctorate in 1923 at the Ludwig-Maximilians-Universität München under Sommerfeld.

In June 1922, Sommerfeld took Heisenberg to Göttingen to attend the Bohr Festival, because Sommerfeld had a sincere interest in his students and knew of Heisenberg's interest in Niels Bohr's theories on atomic physics. At the event, Bohr was a guest lecturer and gave a series of comprehensive lectures on quantum atomic physics and Heisenberg met Bohr for the first time, which had a lasting effect on him.

Heisenberg's doctoral thesis, the topic of which was suggested by Sommerfeld, was on turbulence; the thesis discussed both the stability of laminar flow and the nature of turbulent flow. The problem of stability was investigated by the use of the Orr–Sommerfeld equation, a fourth-order linear differential equation for small disturbances from laminar flow. He briefly returned to this topic after World War II.

At Göttingen, under Born, he completed his habilitation in 1924 with a Habilitationsschrift (habilitation thesis) on the anomalous Zeeman effect.

In his youth, he was a member and Scoutleader of the Neupfadfinder, a German Scout association and part of the German Youth Movement. In August 1923, Robert Honsell and Heisenberg organized a trip to Finland with a Scout group of this association from Munich.

=== Personal life ===
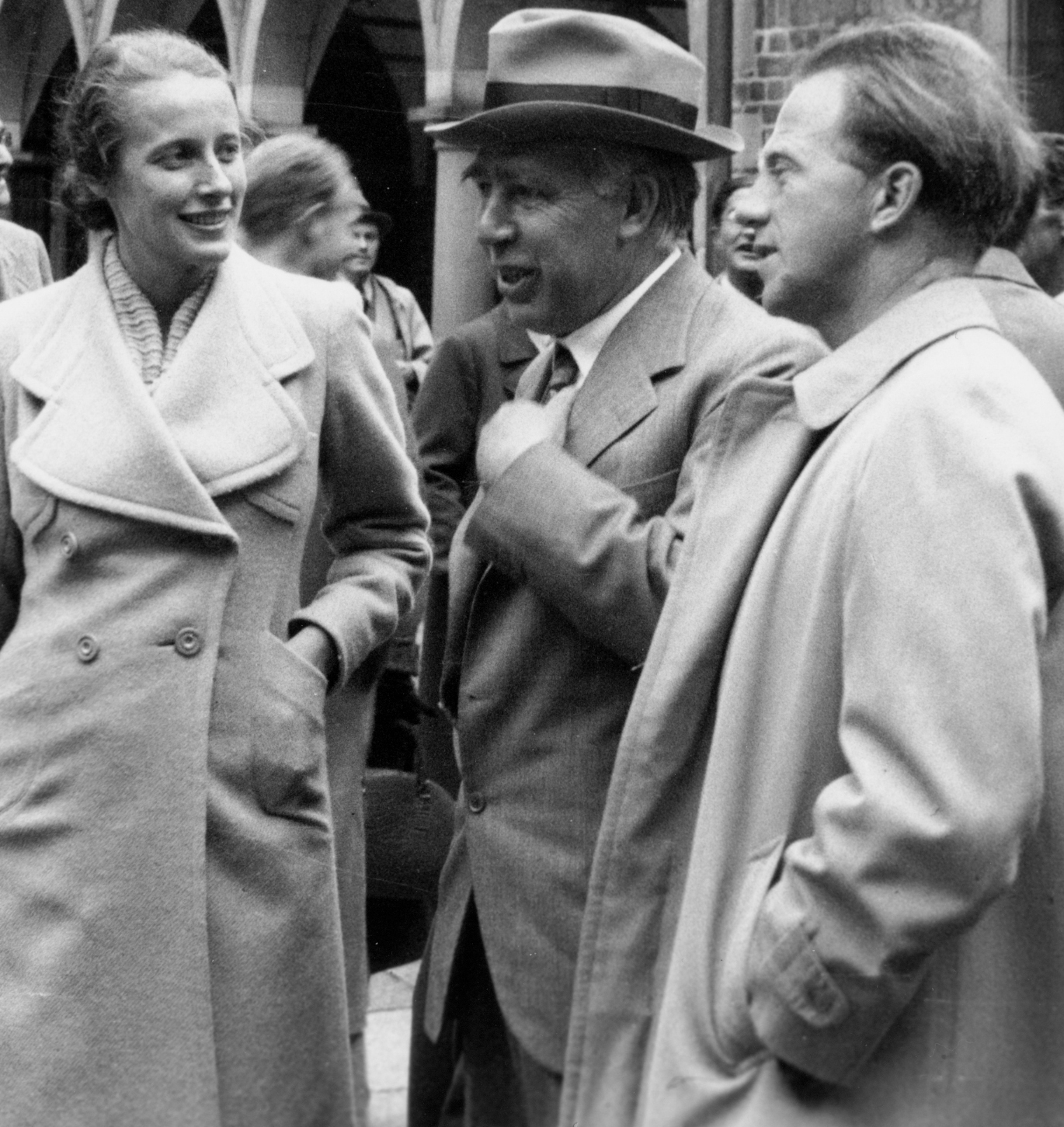
Elisabeth Heisenberg (left) conversing with Niels Bohr and Werner Heisenberg, 1937

Heisenberg enjoyed classical music and was an accomplished pianist; playing for others was a prominent part of his social life. During the late 1920s and early 1930s he would often play music and dance at the Berlin home of his aristocratic student Carl Friedrich von Weizsäcker, during which time he carried on a courtship with Carl's high-school-age sister Adelheid, which led to him being unwelcome at their home for a time. Years later, his interest in music also led to meeting his future wife. In January 1937, Heisenberg met Elisabeth Schumacher (1914–1998) at a private music recital. Schumacher was the daughter of a well-known Berlin economics professor, and her brother was the economist E. F. Schumacher, author of Small Is Beautiful. Heisenberg and Schumacher were married on 29 April. Fraternal twins Maria and Wolfgang were born in January 1938, whereupon Wolfgang Pauli congratulated Heisenberg on his "pair creation"—a wordplay on a process from elementary particle physics, pair production. They had five more children over the next 12 years: Barbara, Christine, Jochen, Martin and Verena. In 1939 he bought a summer home for his family in Urfeld am Walchensee, in southern Germany.

One of Heisenberg's sons, Martin Heisenberg, became a neurobiologist at the University of Würzburg, while another son, Jochen Heisenberg, became a physics professor at the University of New Hampshire.

== Academic career ==
=== Göttingen, Copenhagen and Leipzig ===
From 1924 to 1927, Heisenberg was a Privatdozent at Göttingen, meaning he was qualified to teach and examine independently, without having a chair. From 17 September 1924 to 1 May 1925, under an International Education Board Rockefeller Foundation fellowship, Heisenberg went to do research with Niels Bohr, director of the Institute of Theoretical Physics at the University of Copenhagen. On 7 June, after weeks of failing to alleviate a severe bout of hay fever with aspirin and cocaine, Heisenberg retreated to the pollen-free North Sea island of Helgoland to focus on quantum mechanics. His seminal paper, "Über quantentheoretische Umdeutung kinematischer und mechanischer Beziehungen" ("Quantum theoretical re-interpretation of kinematic and mechanical relations") also called the Umdeutung (reinterpretation) paper, was published in September 1925. He returned to Göttingen and, with Max Born and Pascual Jordan over a period of about six months, developed the matrix mechanics formulation of quantum mechanics. On 1 May 1926, Heisenberg began his appointment as a university lecturer and assistant to Bohr in Copenhagen. It was in Copenhagen, in 1927, that Heisenberg developed his uncertainty principle, while working on the mathematical foundations of quantum mechanics. On 23 February, Heisenberg wrote a letter to fellow physicist Wolfgang Pauli, in which he first described his new principle. In his paper on the principle, Heisenberg used the word "Ungenauigkeit" (imprecision), not uncertainty, to describe it.

In 1927, Heisenberg was appointed ordentlicher Professor (professor ordinarius) of theoretical physics and head of the department of physics at the University of Leipzig; he gave his inaugural lecture there on 1 February 1928. In his first paper published from Leipzig, Heisenberg used the Pauli exclusion principle to solve the mystery of ferromagnetism.

At 25 years old, Heisenberg gained the title of the youngest full-time professor in Germany and professorial chair of the Institute for Theoretical Physics at the University of Leipzig. He gave lectures that were attended by physicists like Edward Teller and Robert Oppenheimer, who would later work on the Manhattan Project for the United States.

During Heisenberg's tenure at Leipzig, the high quality of the doctoral students and post-graduate and research associates who studied and worked with him is clear from the acclaim that many later earned. They included Erich Bagge, Felix Bloch, Ugo Fano, Siegfried Flügge, William Vermillion Houston, Friedrich Hund, Robert S. Mulliken, Rudolf Peierls, George Placzek, Isidor Isaac Rabi, Fritz Sauter, John C. Slater, Edward Teller, John Hasbrouck van Vleck, Victor Frederick Weisskopf, Carl Friedrich von Weizsäcker, Gregor Wentzel, and Clarence Zener.

In early 1929, Heisenberg and Pauli submitted the first of two papers laying the foundation for relativistic quantum field theory. Also in 1929, Heisenberg went on a lecture tour of China, Japan, India, and the United States. In the spring of 1929, he was a visiting lecturer at the University of Chicago, where he lectured on quantum mechanics. In 1929 Heisenberg arrived together with Paul Dirac at Tokyo, where both held lectures. In 1928, the British mathematical physicist Paul Dirac had derived his relativistic wave equation of quantum mechanics, which implied the existence of positive electrons, later to be named positrons. In 1932, from a cloud chamber photograph of cosmic rays, the American physicist Carl David Anderson identified a track as having been made by a positron. In mid-1933, Heisenberg presented his theory of the positron. His thinking on Dirac's theory and further development of the theory were set forth in two papers. The first, "Bemerkungen zur Diracschen Theorie des Positrons" ("Remarks on Dirac's theory of the positron") was published in 1934, and the second, "Folgerungen aus der Diracschen Theorie des Positrons" ("Consequences of Dirac's Theory of the Positron"), was published in 1936. In these papers Heisenberg was the first to reinterpret the Dirac equation as a "classical" field equation for any point particle of spin ħ/2, itself subject to quantization conditions involving anti-commutators. Thus reinterpreting it as a (quantum) field equation accurately describing electrons, Heisenberg put matter on the same footing as electromagnetism: as being described by relativistic quantum field equations which allowed the possibility of particle creation and destruction. (Hermann Weyl had already described this in a 1929 letter to Albert Einstein.)

=== Matrix mechanics and the Nobel Prize ===
Heisenberg's Umdeutung paper that established modern quantum mechanics has puzzled physicists and historians. His methods assume that the reader is familiar with Kramers-Heisenberg transition probability calculations. The main new idea, non-commuting matrices, is justified only by a rejection of unobservable quantities. It introduces the non-commutative multiplication of matrices by physical reasoning, based on the correspondence principle, despite the fact that Heisenberg was not then familiar with the mathematical theory of matrices. The path leading to these results has been reconstructed by MacKinnon, and the detailed calculations are worked out by Aitchison and coauthors.

In Copenhagen, Heisenberg and Hans Kramers collaborated on a paper on dispersion, or the scattering from atoms of radiation whose wavelength is larger than the atoms. They showed that the successful formula Kramers had developed earlier could not be based on Bohr orbits, because the transition frequencies are based on level spacings which are not constant. The frequencies which occur in the Fourier transform of the classical sharp series orbits, by contrast, are equally spaced. But these results could be explained by a semi-classical virtual state model: the incoming radiation excites the valence, or outer, electron to a virtual state from which it decays. In a subsequent paper, Heisenberg showed that this virtual oscillator model could also explain the polarization of fluorescent radiation.

These two successes, and the continuing failure of the Bohr–Sommerfeld model to explain the outstanding problem of the anomalous Zeeman effect, led Heisenberg to use the virtual oscillator model to try to calculate spectral frequencies. The method proved too difficult to immediately apply to realistic problems, so Heisenberg turned to a simpler example, the anharmonic oscillator.

The dipole oscillator consists of a simple harmonic oscillator, which is thought of as a charged particle on a spring, perturbed by an external force, like an external charge. The motion of the oscillating charge can be expressed as a Fourier series in the frequency of the oscillator. Heisenberg solved for the quantum behavior by two different methods. First, he treated the system with the virtual oscillator method, calculating the transitions between the levels that would be produced by the external source.

He then solved the same problem by treating the anharmonic potential term as a perturbation to the harmonic oscillator and using the perturbation methods that he and Born had developed. Both methods led to the same results for the first and the very complicated second-order correction terms. This suggested that behind the very complicated calculations lay a consistent scheme.

So Heisenberg set out to formulate these results without any explicit dependence on the virtual oscillator model. To do this, he replaced the Fourier expansions for the spatial coordinates with matrices, matrices which corresponded to the transition coefficients in the virtual oscillator method. He justified this replacement by an appeal to Bohr's correspondence principle and the Pauli doctrine that quantum mechanics must be limited to observables.

On 9 July, Heisenberg gave Born this paper to review and submit for publication. When Born read the paper, he recognized the formulation as one which could be transcribed and extended to the systematic language of matrices, which he had learned from his study under Jakob Rosanes at Breslau University. Born, with the help of his assistant and former student Pascual Jordan, began immediately to make the transcription and extension, and they submitted their results for publication; the paper was received for publication just 60 days after Heisenberg's paper. A follow-on paper was submitted for publication before the end of the year by all three authors.

Up until this time, matrices were seldom used by physicists; they were considered to belong to the realm of pure mathematics. Gustav Mie had used them in a paper on electrodynamics in 1912 and Born had used them in his work on the lattice theory of crystals in 1921. While matrices were used in these cases, the algebra of matrices with their multiplication did not enter the picture as they did in the matrix formulation of quantum mechanics.

In 1928, Albert Einstein nominated Heisenberg, Born, and Jordan for the Nobel Prize in Physics. The announcement of the Nobel Prize in Physics for 1932 was delayed until November 1933. It was at that time announced that Heisenberg had won the Prize for 1932 "for the creation of quantum mechanics, the application of which has, inter alia, led to the discovery of the allotropic forms of hydrogen".

=== Interpretation of quantum theory ===
The development of quantum mechanics, and the apparently contradictory implications in regard to what is "real" had profound philosophical implications, including what scientific observations truly mean. In contrast to Albert Einstein and Louis de Broglie, who were realists who believed that particles had an objectively true momentum and position at all times (even if both could not be measured), Heisenberg was an anti-realist, arguing that direct knowledge of what is "real" was beyond the scope of science. In his book The Physicist's Conception of Nature, Heisenberg argued that ultimately one only can speak of the knowledge (numbers in tables) which describes something about particles but they can never have any "true" access to the particles themselves:

We can no longer speak of the behaviour of the particle independently of the process of observation. As a final consequence, the natural laws formulated mathematically in quantum theory no longer deal with the elementary particles themselves but with our knowledge of them. Nor is it any longer possible to ask whether or not these particles exist in space and time objectively ... When we speak of the picture of nature in the exact science of our age, we do not mean a picture of nature so much as a picture of our relationships with nature. ...Science no longer confronts nature as an objective observer, but sees itself as an actor in this interplay between man and nature. The scientific method of analysing, explaining and classifying has become conscious of its limitations, which arise out of the fact that by its intervention science alters and refashions the object of investigation. In other words, method and object can no longer be separated.

=== SS investigation ===
Shortly after the discovery of the neutron by James Chadwick in 1932, Heisenberg submitted the first of three papers on his neutron-proton model of the nucleus. After Adolf Hitler came to power in 1933, Heisenberg was attacked in the press as a "White Jew" (i.e. an Aryan who acts like a Jew). Supporters of Deutsche Physik, or German Physics (also known as Aryan Physics), launched vicious attacks against leading theoretical physicists, including Arnold Sommerfeld and Heisenberg. From the early 1930s the anti-Semitic and anti-theoretical physics movement Deutsche Physik had concerned itself with quantum mechanics and the theory of relativity. As applied in the university environment, political factors took priority over scholarly ability, even though its two most prominent supporters were the Nobel Laureates in Physics Philipp Lenard and Johannes Stark.

There had been many failed attempts to have Heisenberg appointed as a professor at a number of German universities. His attempt to be appointed as successor to Arnold Sommerfeld failed because of opposition by the Deutsche Physik movement. On 1 April 1935, the eminent theoretical physicist Sommerfeld, Heisenberg's doctoral advisor at the Ludwig-Maximilians-Universität München, achieved emeritus status. Sommerfeld stayed in his chair during the selection process for his successor, which took until 1 December 1939. The process was lengthy due to academic and political differences between the Faculty's selection at the Ludwig-Maximilians-Universität München and that of the Reichserziehungsministerium (Reich Education Ministry) and the supporters of Deutsche Physik.

In 1935, the Faculty at the Ludwig-Maximilians-Universität München drew up a list of candidates to replace Sommerfeld as ordinarius professor of theoretical physics and head of the Institute for Theoretical Physics at the Ludwig-Maximilians-Universität München. The three candidates had all been former students of Sommerfeld: Heisenberg, who had received the Nobel Prize in Physics; Peter Debye, who had received the Nobel Prize in Chemistry in 1936; and Richard Becker. The Faculty at the Ludwig-Maximilians-Universität München was firmly behind these candidates, with Heisenberg as their first choice. Supporters of Deutsche Physik and elements in the REM had their own list of candidates, and the battle dragged on for over four years. During this time, Heisenberg came under vicious attack by the Deutsche Physik supporters. One attack was published in Das Schwarze Korps, the newspaper of the SS, headed by Heinrich Himmler. In this, Heisenberg was called a "White Jew" who should be made to "disappear". These attacks were taken seriously, as Jews were violently attacked and incarcerated. Heisenberg fought back with an editorial and a letter to Himmler, in an attempt to resolve the matter and regain his honour.

At one point, Heisenberg's mother visited Himmler's mother. The two women knew each other, as Heisenberg's maternal grandfather and Himmler's father were rectors and members of a Bavarian hiking club. Eventually, Himmler settled the Heisenberg affair by sending two letters, one to SS Gruppenführer Reinhard Heydrich and one to Heisenberg, both on 21 July 1938. In the letter to Heydrich, Himmler said Germany could not afford to lose or silence Heisenberg, as he would be useful for teaching a generation of scientists. To Heisenberg, Himmler said the letter came on the recommendation of his family and he cautioned Heisenberg to make a distinction between professional physics research results and the personal and political attitudes of the involved scientists.

Wilhelm Müller replaced Sommerfeld at the Ludwig-Maximilians-Universität München. Müller was not a theoretical physicist, had not published in a physics journal and was not a member of the Deutsche Physikalische Gesellschaft (German Physical Society). His appointment was considered a travesty and detrimental to educating theoretical physicists.

The three investigators who led the SS investigation of Heisenberg had training in physics. Heisenberg had participated in the doctoral examination of one of them at the Universität Leipzig. The most influential of the three was Johannes Juilfs. During their investigation, they became supporters of Heisenberg as well as his position against the ideological policies of the Deutsche Physik movement in theoretical physics and academe.

== German nuclear weapons program ==
=== Pre-war work on physics ===
In mid-1936, Heisenberg presented his theory of cosmic-ray showers in two papers. Four more papers appeared in the next two years.

In December 1938, the German chemists Otto Hahn and Fritz Strassmann sent a manuscript to The Natural Sciences reporting they had detected the element barium after bombarding uranium with neutrons, leading Hahn to conclude that a bursting of the uranium nucleus had occurred; simultaneously, Hahn communicated these results to his friend Lise Meitner, who had in July of that year fled, first to the Netherlands, then to Sweden. Meitner, and her nephew Otto Robert Frisch, correctly interpreted Hahn's and Strassmann's results as being nuclear fission. Frisch confirmed this experimentally on 13 January 1939.

In June and July 1939, Heisenberg traveled to the United States visiting Samuel Abraham Goudsmit at the University of Michigan in Ann Arbor. However, Heisenberg refused an invitation to emigrate to the United States. He did not see Goudsmit again until six years later, when Goudsmit was the chief scientific advisor to the American Operation Alsos at the close of World War II.

=== Membership in the Uranverein ===
The German nuclear weapons program, known as Uranverein, was formed on 1 September 1939, the day World War II began in Europe. The Heereswaffenamt (HWA, Army Ordnance Office) had squeezed the Reichsforschungsrat (RFR, Reich Research Council) out of the Reichserziehungsministerium (REM, Reich Ministry of Education) and started the formal German nuclear energy project under military auspices. The project had its first meeting on 16 September 1939. The meeting was organized by Kurt Diebner, advisor to the HWA, and held in Berlin. The invitees included Walther Bothe, Siegfried Flügge, Hans Geiger, Otto Hahn, Paul Harteck, Gerhard Hoffmann, Josef Mattauch and Georg Stetter. A second meeting was held soon thereafter and included Heisenberg, Klaus Clusius, Robert Döpel and Carl Friedrich von Weizsäcker. The Kaiser-Wilhelm Institut für Physik (KWIP, Kaiser Wilhelm Institute for Physics) in Berlin-Dahlem, was placed under HWA authority, with Diebner as the administrative director, and the military control of the nuclear research commenced. During the period when Diebner administered the KWIP under the HWA program, considerable personal and professional animosity developed between Diebner and Heisenberg's inner circle, which included Karl Wirtz and Carl Friedrich von Weizsäcker.

A visual representation of an induced nuclear fission event where a slow-moving neutron is absorbed by the nucleus of a uranium-235 atom, which fissions into two fast-moving lighter elements (fission products) and additional neutrons. Most of the energy released is in the form of the kinetic velocities of the fission products and the neutrons.

At a scientific conference on 26–28 February 1942 at the Kaiser Wilhelm Institute for Physics, called by the Army Weapons Office, Heisenberg presented a lecture to Reich officials on energy acquisition from nuclear fission. The lecture, entitled "Die theoretischen Grundlagen für die Energiegewinnung aus der Uranspaltung" ("The theoretical basis for energy generation from uranium fission") was, as Heisenberg wrote after the Second World War in a letter to Samuel Goudsmit, "adapted to the intelligence level of a Reich Minister". Heisenberg lectured on the enormous energy potential of nuclear fission, stating that 250 million electron volts could be released through the fission of an atomic nucleus. Heisenberg stressed that pure U-235 had to be obtained to achieve a chain reaction. He explored various ways of obtaining isotope ^{235}_{92}U in its pure form, including uranium enrichment and an alternative layered method of normal uranium and a moderator in a machine. This machine, he noted, could be used in practical ways to fuel vehicles, ships and submarines. Heisenberg stressed the importance of the Army Weapons Office's financial and material support for this scientific endeavour.

A second scientific conference followed. Lectures were heard on problems of modern physics with decisive importance for the national defense and economy. The conference was attended by Bernhard Rust, the Reich Minister of Science, Education and National Culture. At the conference, Reich Minister Rust decided to take the nuclear project away from the Kaiser Wilhelm Society, and give it to the Reich Research Council.

In April 1942 the army returned the Physics Institute to the Kaiser Wilhelm Society, naming Heisenberg as Director at the Institute. Peter Debye was still director of the institute, but had gone on leave to the United States after he had refused to become a German citizen when the HWA took administrative control of the KWIP. Heisenberg still also had his department of physics at the University of Leipzig where work had been done for the Uranverein by Robert Döpel and his wife Klara Döpel.

On 4 June 1942, Heisenberg was summoned to report to Albert Speer, Germany's Minister of Armaments, on the prospects for converting the Uranverein's research toward developing nuclear weapons. During the meeting, Heisenberg told Speer that a bomb could not be built before 1945, because it would require significant monetary resources and number of personnel.

After the Uranverein project was placed under the leadership of the Reich Research Council, it focused on nuclear power production and thus maintained its kriegswichtig (importance for the war) status; funding therefore continued from the military. The nuclear power project was broken down into the following main areas: uranium and heavy water production, uranium isotope separation and the Uranmaschine (uranium machine, i.e., nuclear reactor). The project was then essentially split up between a number of institutes, where the directors dominated the research and set their own research agendas. The point in 1942, when the army relinquished its control of the German nuclear weapons program, was the zenith of the project relative to the number of personnel. About 70 scientists worked for the program, with about 40 devoting more than half their time to nuclear fission research. After 1942, the number of scientists working on applied nuclear fission diminished dramatically. Many of the scientists not working with the main institutes stopped working on nuclear fission and devoted their efforts to more pressing war-related work.

In September 1942, Heisenberg submitted his first paper of a three-part series on the scattering matrix, or S-matrix, in elementary particle physics. The first two papers were published in 1943 and the third in 1944. The S-matrix described only the states of incident particles in a collision process, the states of those emerging from the collision, and stable bound states; there would be no reference to the intervening states. This was the same precedent as he followed in 1925 in what turned out to be the foundation of the matrix formulation of quantum mechanics through only the use of observables.

In February 1943, Heisenberg was appointed to the Chair for Theoretical Physics at the Friedrich-Wilhelms-Universität (today, the Humboldt-Universität zu Berlin). In April, his election to the Preußische Akademie der Wissenschaften (Prussian Academy of Sciences) was approved. That same month, he moved his family to their retreat in Urfeld as Allied bombing increased in Berlin. In the summer, he dispatched the first of his staff at the Kaiser-Wilhelm Institut für Physik to Hechingen and its neighboring town of Haigerloch, on the edge of the Black Forest, for the same reasons. From 18–26 October, he travelled to German-occupied Netherlands. In December 1943, Heisenberg visited German-occupied Poland.

From 24 January to 4 February 1944, Heisenberg travelled to occupied Copenhagen, after the German army confiscated Bohr's Institute of Theoretical Physics. He made a short return trip in April. In December, Heisenberg lectured in neutral Switzerland. The United States Office of Strategic Services sent agent Moe Berg to attend the lecture carrying a pistol, with orders to shoot Heisenberg if his lecture indicated that Germany was close to completing an atomic bomb.

In January 1945, Heisenberg, with most of the rest of his staff, moved from the Kaiser-Wilhelm Institut für Physik to the facilities in the Black Forest.

== Post-Second World War ==
=== 1945: Alsos Mission ===
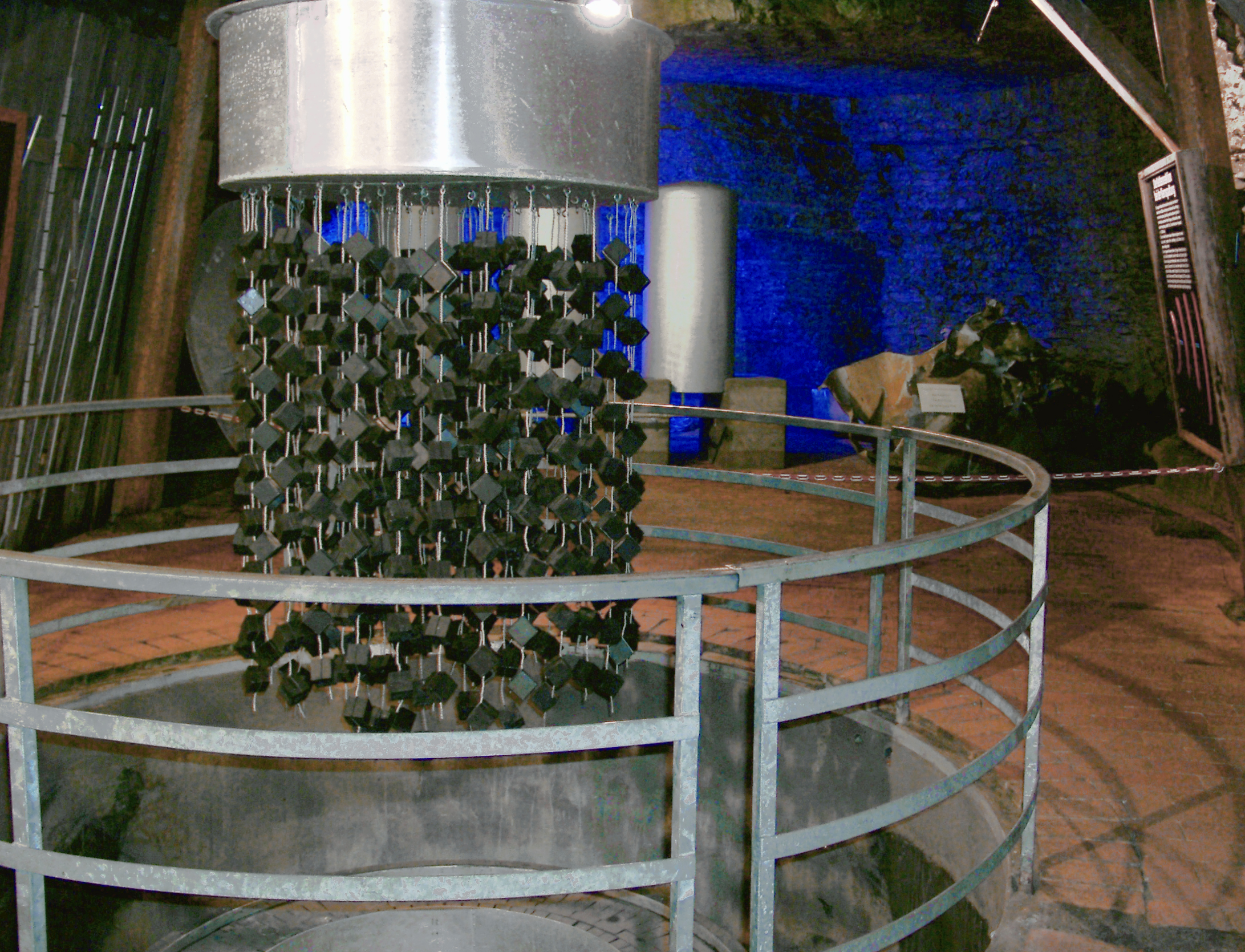
Replica of the German experimental nuclear reactor captured and dismantled at Haigerloch

The Alsos Mission was an Allied effort to determine whether the Germans had an atomic bomb program and to exploit German atomic-related facilities, research, material resources, and scientific personnel for the benefit of the US. Personnel on this operation generally swept into areas that had just come under control of the Allied military forces, but sometimes they operated in areas still under control by German forces. Berlin had been a location of many German scientific research facilities. To limit casualties and loss of equipment, many of these facilities were dispersed to other locations in the latter years of the war. The Kaiser-Wilhelm-Institut für Physik (KWIP, Kaiser Wilhelm Institute for Physics) had been bombed so it had mostly been moved in 1943 and 1944 to Hechingen and its neighbouring town of Haigerloch, on the edge of the Black Forest, which eventually became included in the French occupation zone. This allowed the American task force of the Alsos Mission to take into custody a large number of German scientists associated with nuclear research.

On 30 March, the Alsos Mission reached Heidelberg, where important scientists were captured including Walther Bothe, Richard Kuhn, Philipp Lenard, and Wolfgang Gentner. Their interrogation revealed that Otto Hahn was at his laboratory in Tailfingen, while Heisenberg and Max von Laue were at Heisenberg's laboratory in Hechingen, and that the experimental natural uranium reactor that Heisenberg's team had built in Berlin had been moved to Haigerloch. Thereafter, the main focus of the Alsos Mission was on these nuclear facilities in the Württemberg area. Heisenberg was smuggled out from Urfeld, on 3 May 1945, in an alpine operation in territory still under control by elite German forces. He was taken to Heidelberg, where, on 5 May, he met Goudsmit for the first time since the Ann Arbor visit in 1939. Germany surrendered just two days later. Heisenberg would not see his family again for eight months, as he was moved across France and Belgium and flown to England on 3 July 1945.

=== 1945: Reaction to Hiroshima ===
Nine of the prominent German scientists who published reports in Nuclear Physics Research Reports as members of the Uranverein were captured by Operation Alsos and incarcerated in England under Operation Epsilon. Ten German scientists, including Heisenberg, were held at Farm Hall at Godmanchester in England. The facility had been a safe house of the British foreign intelligence MI6. During their detention, their conversations were recorded. Conversations thought to be of intelligence value were transcribed and translated into English. The transcripts were released in 1992. On 6 August 1945, the scientists at Farm Hall learned from media reports that the US had dropped an atomic bomb in Hiroshima, Japan. At first, there was disbelief that a bomb had been built and dropped. In the weeks that followed, the German scientists discussed how the United States might have built the bomb.

The Farm Hall transcripts reveal that Heisenberg, along with other physicists interned at Farm Hall including Otto Hahn and Carl Friedrich von Weizsäcker, were glad the Allies had won World War II. Heisenberg told other scientists that he had never contemplated a bomb, only an atomic pile to produce energy. The morality of creating a bomb for the Nazis was also discussed. Only a few of the scientists expressed horror at the prospect of nuclear weapons, and Heisenberg was cautious in discussing the matter. On the failure of the German nuclear weapons program to build an atomic bomb, Heisenberg remarked, "We wouldn't have had the moral courage to recommend to the government in the spring of 1942 that they should employ 120,000 men just for building the thing up."

When in 1992 the transcripts were declassified, German physicist Manfred Popp analyzed the transcripts, as well as the documentation of Uranverein. When the German scientists heard about the Hiroshima bomb, Heisenberg admitted that he had never calculated the critical mass of an atomic bomb before. When he subsequently attempted to calculate the mass, he made serious calculation errors. Edward Teller and Hans Bethe saw the transcript, and drew the conclusion that Heisenberg had done it for the first time as he made similar errors as they had. Only a week later Heisenberg gave a lecture about the physics of the bomb. He correctly recognized many essential aspects, including the efficiency of the bomb, although he still underestimated it. For Popp, this is proof that Heisenberg did not spend time on a nuclear weapon during the war; on the contrary, he avoided even thinking about it.

== Post-war research career ==
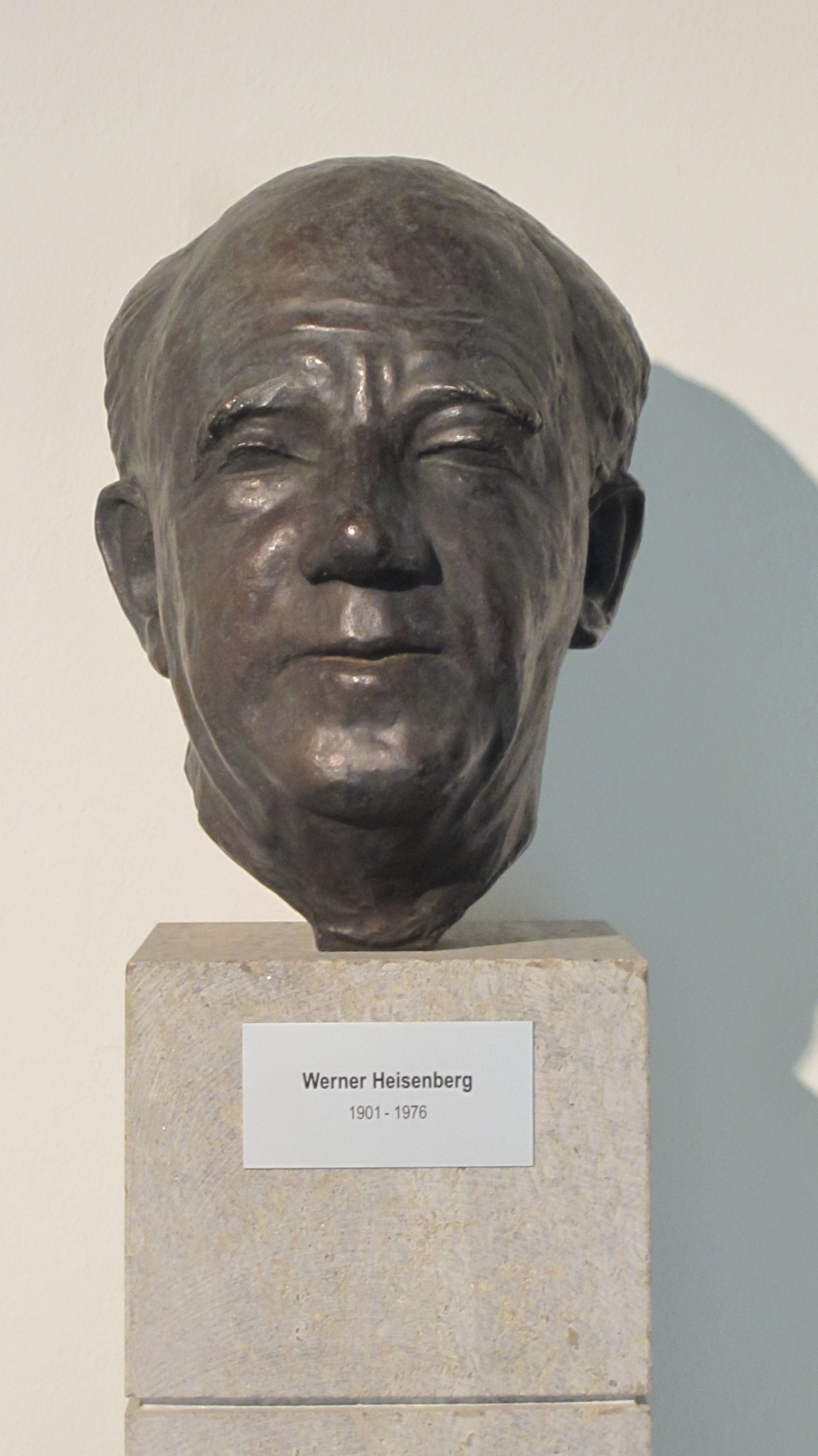
Bust of Heisenberg in his old age, on display at the Max Planck Society campus in Garching bei München

=== Executive positions at German research institutions ===
On 3 January 1946, the ten Operation Epsilon detainees were transported to Alswede in Germany. Heisenberg settled in Göttingen, which was in the British zone of Allied-occupied Germany. Heisenberg immediately began to promote scientific research in Germany. Following the Kaiser Wilhelm Society's dissolution by the Allied Control Council and the establishment of the Max Planck Society in the British zone, Heisenberg became the director of the Max Planck Institute for Physics. Max von Laue was appointed vice director, while Karl Wirtz, Carl Friedrich von Weizsäcker and Ludwig Biermann joined to help Heisenberg establish the institute. Heinz Billing joined in 1950 to promote the development of electronic computing. The core research focus of the institute was cosmic radiation. The institute held a colloquium every Saturday morning.

Heisenberg together with Hermann Rein was instrumental in the establishment of the Forschungsrat (research council). Heisenberg envisaged this council to promote the dialogue between the newly founded Federal Republic of Germany and the scientific community, based in Germany. Heisenberg was appointed president of the Forschungsrat. In 1951, the organization was fused with the Notgemeinschaft der Deutschen Wissenschaft (Emergency Association of German Science) and that same year renamed the Deutsche Forschungsgemeinschaft (German Research Foundation). Following the merger, Heisenberg was appointed to the presidium.

In 1958, the Max-Planck-Institut für Physik was moved to Munich, expanded, and renamed Max-Planck-Institut für Physik und Astrophysik (MPIFA). In the interim, Heisenberg and the astrophysicist Ludwig Biermann were co-directors of MPIFA. Heisenberg also became an ordentlicher Professor (ordinarius professor) at the Ludwig-Maximilians-Universität München. Heisenberg was the sole director of MPIFA from 1960 to 1970. Heisenberg resigned his directorship of the MPIFA on 31 December 1970.

=== Promotion of international scientific cooperation ===
In 1951, Heisenberg agreed to become the scientific representative of the Federal Republic of Germany at the UNESCO conference, with the aim of establishing a European laboratory for nuclear physics. Heisenberg's aim was to build a large particle accelerator, drawing on the resources and technical skills of scientists across the Western Bloc. On 1 July 1953 Heisenberg signed the convention that established CERN on behalf of the Federal Republic of Germany. Although he was asked to become CERN's founding scientific director, he declined. Instead, he was appointed chair of CERN's science policy committee and went on to determine the scientific program at CERN.

In December 1953, Heisenberg became the president of the Alexander von Humboldt Foundation. During his tenure as president 550 Humboldt scholars from 78 nations received scientific research grants. Heisenberg resigned as president shortly before his death.

=== Research interests ===
In 1946, the German scientist Heinz Pose, head of Laboratory V in Obninsk, wrote a letter to Heisenberg inviting him to work in the USSR. The letter lauded the working conditions in the USSR and the available resources, as well as the favorable attitude of the Soviets towards German scientists. A courier hand delivered the recruitment letter, dated 18 July 1946, to Heisenberg; Heisenberg politely declined. In 1947, Heisenberg presented lectures in Cambridge, Edinburgh and Bristol. Heisenberg contributed to the understanding of the phenomenon of superconductivity with a paper in 1947 and two papers in 1948, one of them with Max von Laue.

In the period shortly after World War II, Heisenberg briefly returned to the subject of his doctoral thesis, turbulence. Three papers were published in 1948 and one in 1950. In the post-war period Heisenberg continued his interests in cosmic-ray showers with considerations on multiple production of mesons. He published three papers in 1949, two in 1952, and one in 1955.

In late 1955 to early 1956, Heisenberg gave the Gifford Lectures at St Andrews University, in Scotland, on the intellectual history of physics. The lectures were later published as Physics and Philosophy: The Revolution in Modern Science. During 1956 and 1957, Heisenberg was the chairman of the Arbeitskreis Kernphysik (Nuclear Physics Working Group) of the Fachkommission II "Forschung und Nachwuchs" (Commission II "Research and Growth") of the Deutsche Atomkommission (DAtK, German Atomic Energy Commission). Other members of the Nuclear Physics Working Group in both 1956 and 1957 were: Walther Bothe, Hans Kopfermann (vice-chairman), Fritz Bopp, Wolfgang Gentner, Otto Haxel, Willibald Jentschke, Heinz Maier-Leibnitz, Josef Mattauch, Wolfgang Riezler, Wilhelm Walcher and Carl Friedrich von Weizsäcker. Wolfgang Paul was also a member of the group during 1957.

In 1957, Heisenberg was a signatory of the Göttinger Manifest, taking a public stand against the Federal Republic of Germany arming itself with nuclear weapons. Heisenberg, like Pascual Jordan, thought politicians would ignore this statement by nuclear scientists. But Heisenberg believed that the Göttinger Manifest would "influence public opinion" which politicians would have to take into account. He wrote to Walther Gerlach: "We will probably have to keep coming back to this question in public for a long time because of the danger that public opinion will slacken." In 1961 Heisenberg signed the Memorandum of Tübingen alongside a group of scientists who had been brought together by Carl Friedrich von Weizsäcker and Ludwig Raiser. A public discussion between scientists and politicians ensued. As prominent politicians, authors and socialites joined the debate on nuclear weapons, the signatories of the memorandum took a stand against "the full-time intellectual nonconformists".

From 1957 onwards, Heisenberg was interested in plasma physics and the process of nuclear fusion. He also collaborated with the International Institute of Atomic Physics in Geneva. He was a member of the Institute's scientific policy committee, and for several years was the Committee's chair. He was one of the eight signatories of the Memorandum of Tübingen which called for the recognition of the Oder–Neiße line as the official border between Germany and Poland and spoke against a possible nuclear armament of West Germany.

In 1973, Heisenberg gave a lecture at Harvard University on the historical development of the concepts of quantum theory. On 24 March 1973 Heisenberg gave a speech before the Catholic Academy of Bavaria, accepting the Romano Guardini Prize. An English translation of his speech was published under the title "Scientific and Religious Truth", a quotation from which appears in a later section of this article.

== Philosophy and worldview ==
Heisenberg admired Eastern philosophy and saw parallels between it and quantum mechanics, describing himself as in "complete agreement" with the book The Tao of Physics. Heisenberg even went as far to state that after conversations with Rabindranath Tagore about Indian philosophy "some of the ideas that seemed so crazy suddenly made much more sense". Regarding the laws of nature he remarked that "the concept of 'the law of nature' cannot be completely objective, the word 'law' being a purely human principle".

Regarding the philosophy of Ludwig Wittgenstein, Heisenberg disliked Tractatus Logico-Philosophicus but he liked "very much the later ideas of Wittgenstein and his philosophy about language."

Heisenberg, a devout Christian, wrote: "We can console ourselves that the good Lord God would know the position of the [subatomic] particles, thus He would let the causality principle continue to have validity", in his last letter to Albert Einstein. Einstein continued to maintain that quantum physics must be incomplete because it implies that the universe is indeterminate at a fundamental level.

In lectures given in the 1950s and later published as Physics and Philosophy, Heisenberg contended that scientific advances were leading to cultural conflicts. He stated that modern physics is "part of a general historical process that tends toward a unification and a widening of our present world".

When Heisenberg accepted the Romano Guardini Prize in 1974, he gave a speech, which he later published under the title Scientific and Religious Truth. He mused:

In the history of science, ever since the famous trial of Galileo, it has repeatedly been claimed that scientific truth cannot be reconciled with the religious interpretation of the world. Although I am now convinced that scientific truth is unassailable in its own field, I have never found it possible to dismiss the content of religious thinking as simply part of an outmoded phase in the consciousness of mankind, a part we shall have to give up from now on. Thus in the course of my life I have repeatedly been compelled to ponder on the relationship of these two regions of thought, for I have never been able to doubt the reality of that to which they point.

— Heisenberg 1974, 213

Heisenberg referred to nature as "God's second book" (the first being the Bible) and believed that "Physics is reflection on the divine ideas of Creation; therefore physics is divine service". This was because "God created the world in accordance with his ideas of creation" and humans can understand the world because "Man was created as the spiritual image of God".

== Political stance ==
Heisenberg never participated in explicit National Socialist propaganda. However, he fully supported Nazi Germany's project of European "renewal", which corresponded with his German-imperialist convictions. The Dutch physicist Hendrik Casimir recalled hearing from Heisenberg in 1943 that German world domination was a historical necessity due to the weakness of Western liberal democracy and the alternative of Soviet Communism. According to the British-German physicist Rudolf Peierls, while visiting England in 1947 Heisenberg told a colleague who had been forced to emigrate from Germany that after another fifty years in power the Nazis "would have become quite decent". The Austrian-Swedish physicist Lise Meitner quoted Heisenberg's 1948 reply to being confronted with German atrocities: "Unfortunately, every spiritual upheaval has always been accompanied by great cruelty".

Heisenberg, who did not leave Germany during the Nazi rule, was also unwilling to emigrate after the war. Responding to an offer of permanent endowed employment at Yale University in 1951 conveyed by Gregory Breit, he stated he would have considered it only if World War III had broken out and the Soviet Union had occupied Göttingen.

== Autobiography and death ==
In his late sixties, Heisenberg penned his autobiography for the mass market. In 1969 the book was published in Germany, in early 1971 it was published in English and in the years thereafter in a string of other languages. Heisenberg initiated the project in 1966, when his public lectures increasingly turned to the subjects of philosophy and religion. Heisenberg had sent the manuscript for a textbook on the unified field theory to Hirzel Verlag and John Wiley & Sons for publication. This manuscript, he wrote to one of his publishers, was the preparatory work for his autobiography. He structured his autobiography in themes, covering: 1) The goal of exact science, 2) The problematic of language in atomic physics, 3) Abstraction in mathematics and science, 4) The divisibility of matter or Kant's antinomy, 5) The basic symmetry and its substantiation, and 6) Science and religion.

Heisenberg wrote his memoirs as a chain of conversations, covering the course of his life. The book became a popular success, but was regarded as troublesome by historians of science. In the preface Heisenberg wrote that he had abridged historical events, to make them more concise. At the time of publication, it was reviewed by Paul Forman in the journal Science with the comment "Now here is a memoir in the form of rationally reconstructed dialogue. And the dialogue as Galileo well knew, is itself a most insidious literary device: lively, entertaining, and especially suited for insinuating opinions while yet evading responsibility for them." Few scientific memoirs had been published, but Konrad Lorenz and Adolf Portmann had penned popular books that conveyed scholarship to a wide audience. Heisenberg worked on his autobiography and published it with the Piper Verlag in Munich. Heisenberg initially proposed the title Gespräche im Umkreis der Atomphysik (Conversations on Atomic Physics). The autobiography was published eventually under the title Der Teil und das Ganze (The Part and the Whole). The 1971 English translation was published under the title Physics and Beyond: Encounters and Conversations.

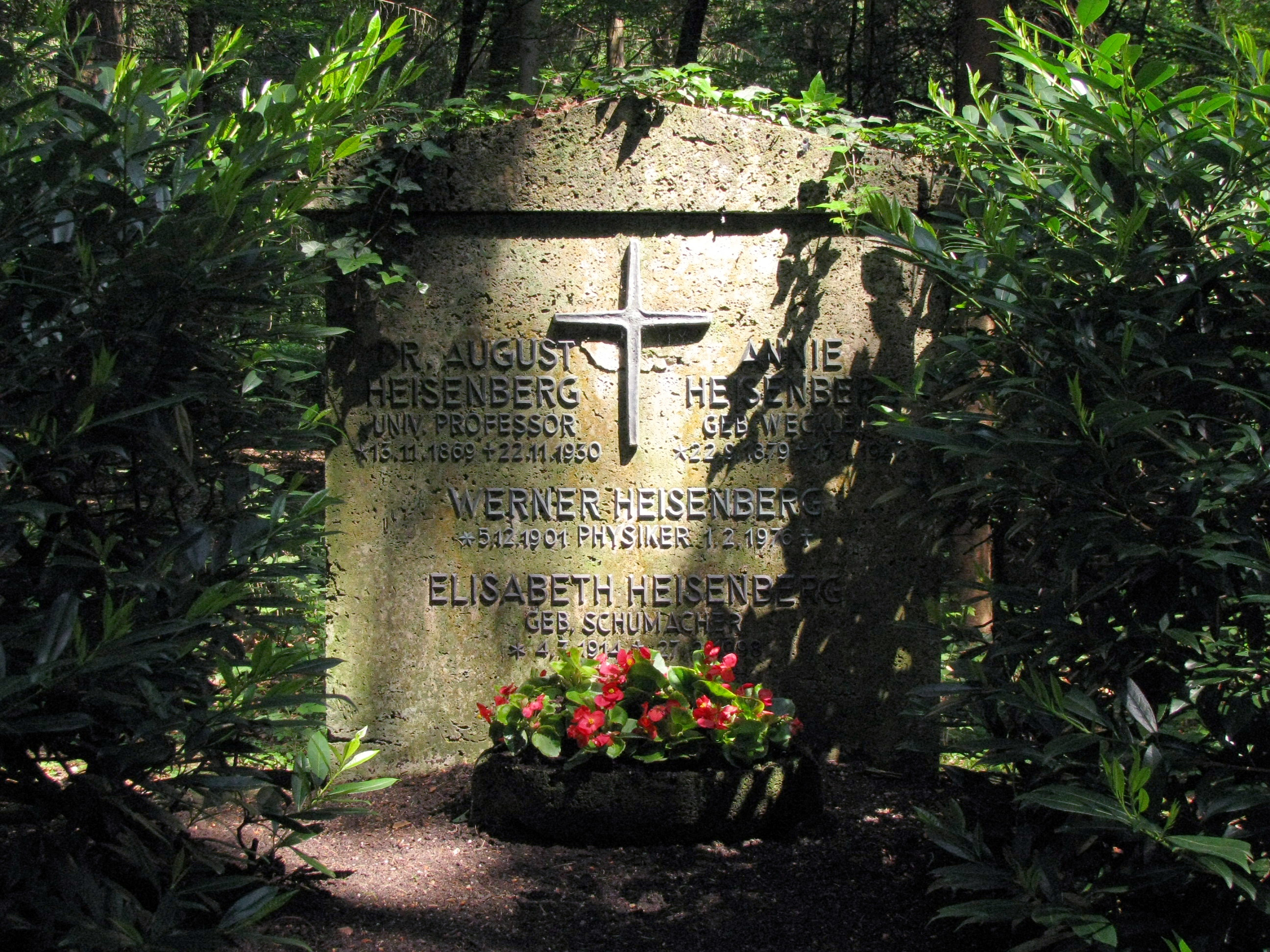
The grave of the Heisenberg family in Munich Waldfriedhof, including August Heisenberg (1869–1930), Annie Heisenberg (1879–1945), Werner Heisenberg (1901–1976), and Elisabeth Heisenberg (1914–1998)

Heisenberg died of kidney cancer at his home, on 1 February 1976. The next evening, his colleagues and friends walked in remembrance from the Institute of Physics to his home, lit a candle and placed it in front of his door. Heisenberg is buried in Munich Waldfriedhof.

In 1980 his widow, Elisabeth Heisenberg, published Das politische Leben eines Unpolitischen (The Political Life of an Apolitical Person), in which she characterized Heisenberg as "first and foremost, a spontaneous person, thereafter a brilliant scientist, next a highly talented artist, and only in the fourth place, from a sense of duty, homo politicus".

== Honors and awards ==
Heisenberg was awarded a number of honors:

- Honorary doctorates from the University of Brussels, the Technological University of Karlsruhe, and Eötvös Loránd University.
- Bavarian Order of Merit
- Romano Guardini Prize
- Grand Cross for Federal Service with Star
- Pour le Mérite (Civil Class)
- Elected an International Member of the American Philosophical Society in 1937, a Foreign Member of the Royal Society (ForMemRS) in 1955, and an International Honorary Member of the American Academy of Arts and Sciences in 1958.
- Member of the Academies of Sciences of Göttingen, Bavaria, Saxony, Prussia, Sweden, Romania, Norway, Spain, The Netherlands (1939), Rome (Pontifical), the Deutsche Akademie der Naturforscher Leopoldina (Halle), the Accademia dei Lincei (Rome), and the American Academy of Sciences.
- 1932 – Nobel Prize in Physics "for the creation of quantum mechanics, the application of which has, inter alia, led to the discovery of the allotropic forms of hydrogen".
- 1933 – Max-Planck-Medaille of the Deutsche Physikalische Gesellschaft

== Research reports on nuclear physics ==
The following reports were published in Kernphysikalische Forschungsberichte (Research Reports in Nuclear Physics), an internal publication of the German Uranverein. The reports were classified Top Secret, they had very limited distribution, and the authors were not allowed to keep copies. The reports were confiscated under the Allied Operation Alsos and sent to the United States Atomic Energy Commission for evaluation. In 1971, the reports were declassified and returned to Germany. The reports are available at the Karlsruhe Nuclear Research Center and the American Institute of Physics.

- Werner Heisenberg Die Möglichkeit der technischer Energiegewinnung aus der Uranspaltung G-39 (6 December 1939)
- Werner Heisenberg Bericht über die Möglichkeit technischer Energiegewinnung aus der Uranspaltung (II) G-40 (29 February 1940)
- Robert Döpel, K. Döpel, and Werner Heisenberg Bestimmung der Diffusionslänge thermischer Neutronen in schwerem Wasser G-23 (7 August 1940)
- Robert Döpel, K. Döpel, and Werner Heisenberg Bestimmung der Diffusionslänge thermischer Neutronen in Präparat 38 G-22 (5 December 1940)
- Robert Döpel, K. Döpel, and Werner Heisenberg Versuche mit Schichtenanordnungen von D_{2}O und 38 G-75 (28 October 1941)
- Werner Heisenberg Über die Möglichkeit der Energieerzeugung mit Hilfe des Isotops 238 G-92 (1941)
- Werner Heisenberg Bericht über Versuche mit Schichtenanordnungen von Präparat 38 und Paraffin am Kaiser Wilhelm Institut für Physik in Berlin-Dahlem G-93 (May 1941)
- Fritz Bopp, Erich Fischer, Werner Heisenberg, Carl-Friedrich von Weizsäcker, and Karl Wirtz Untersuchungen mit neuen Schichtenanordnungen aus U-metall und Paraffin G-127 (March 1942)
- Robert Döpel Bericht über Unfälle beim Umgang mit Uranmetall G-135 (9 July 1942)
- Werner Heisenberg Bemerkungen zu dem geplanten halbtechnischen Versuch mit 1,5 to D_{2}O und 3 to 38-Metall G-161 (31 July 1942)
- Werner Heisenberg, Fritz Bopp, Erich Fischer, Carl-Friedrich von Weizsäcker, and Karl Wirtz Messungen an Schichtenanordnungen aus 38-Metall und Paraffin G-162 (30 October 1942)
- Robert Döpel, K. Döpel, and Werner Heisenberg Der experimentelle Nachweis der effektiven Neutronenvermehrung in einem Kugel-Schichten-System aus D_{2}O und Uran-Metall G-136 (July 1942)
- Werner Heisenberg Die Energiegewinnung aus der Atomkernspaltung G-217 (6 May 1943)
- Fritz Bopp, Walther Bothe, Erich Fischer, Erwin Fünfer, Werner Heisenberg, O. Ritter, and Karl Wirtz Bericht über einen Versuch mit 1.5 to D_{2}O und U und 40 cm Kohlerückstreumantel (B7) G-300 (3 January 1945)
- Robert Döpel, K. Döpel, and Werner Heisenberg Die Neutronenvermehrung in einem D_{2}O-38-Metallschichtensystem G-373 (March 1942)

== Other research publications ==
- Sommerfeld, A.; Heisenberg, W. (1922). "Eine Bemerkung über relativistische Röntgendubletts und Linienschärfe". Z. Phys. 10 (1): 393–398. Bibcode:1922ZPhy...10..393S. doi:10.1007/BF01332582. S2CID 123083509.
- Sommerfeld, A.; Heisenberg, W. (1922). "Die Intensität der Mehrfachlinien und ihrer Zeeman-Komponenten". Z. Phys. 11 (1): 131–154. Bibcode:1922ZPhy...11..131S. doi:10.1007/BF01328408. S2CID 186227343.
- Born, M.; Heisenberg, W. (1923). "Über Phasenbeziehungen bei den Bohrschen Modellen von Atomen und Molekeln". Z. Phys. 14 (1): 44–55. Bibcode:1923ZPhy...14...44B. doi:10.1007/BF01340032. S2CID 186228402.
- Born, M.; Heisenberg, W. (1923). "Die Elektronenbahnen im angeregten Heliumatom". Z. Phys. 16 (9): 229–243. Bibcode:1924AnP...379....1B. doi:10.1002/andp.19243790902.
- Born, M.; Heisenberg, W. (1924). "Zur Quantentheorie der Molekeln". Annalen der Physik. 74 (4): 1–31. Bibcode:1924AnP...379....1B. doi:10.1002/andp.19243790902.
- Born, M.; Heisenberg, W. (1924). "Über den Einfluss der Deformierbarkeit der Ionen auf optische und chemische Konstanten. I". Z. Phys. 23 (1): 388–410. Bibcode:1924ZPhy...23..388B. doi:10.1007/BF01327603. S2CID 186220818.
- — (1924). "Über Stabilität und Turbulenz von Flüssigkeitsströmmen (Diss.)". Annalen der Physik. 74 (4): 577–627. Bibcode:1924AnP...379..577H. doi:10.1002/andp.19243791502. hdl:2060/19930093939.
- — (1924). "Über eine Abänderung der formalin Regeln der Quantentheorie beim Problem der anomalen Zeeman-Effekte". Z. Phys. 26 (1): 291–307. Bibcode:1924ZPhy...26..291H. doi:10.1007/BF01327336. S2CID 186215582.
- — (1925). "Über quantentheoretische Umdeutung kinematischer und mechanischer Beziehungen". Zeitschrift für Physik. 33 (1): 879–893. Bibcode:1925ZPhy...33..879H. doi:10.1007/BF01328377. S2CID 186238950. The paper was received on 29 July 1925. [English translation in: van der Waerden 1968, 12 "Quantum-Theoretical Re-interpretation of Kinematic and Mechanical Relations"] This is the first paper in the famous trilogy which launched the matrix mechanics formulation of quantum mechanics.
- Born, M.; Jordan, P. (1925). "Zur Quantenmechanik". Zeitschrift für Physik. 34 (1): 858–888. Bibcode:1925ZPhy...34..858B. doi:10.1007/BF01328531. S2CID 186114542. The paper was received on 27 September 1925. [English translation in: van der Waerden 1968, "On Quantum Mechanics"] This is the second paper in the famous trilogy which launched the matrix mechanics formulation of quantum mechanics.
- Born, M.; Heisenberg, W.; Jordan, P. (1926). "Zur Quantenmechanik II". Zeitschrift für Physik. 35 (8–9): 557–615. Bibcode:1926ZPhy...35..557B. doi:10.1007/BF01379806. S2CID 186237037. The paper was received on 16 November 1925. [English translation in: van der Waerden 1968, 15 "On Quantum Mechanics II"] This is the third paper in the famous trilogy which launched the matrix mechanics formulation of quantum mechanics.
- — (1927). "Über den anschaulichen Inhalt der quantentheoretischen Kinematik und Mechanik". Z. Phys. 43 (3–4): 172–198. Bibcode:1927ZPhy...43..172H. doi:10.1007/BF01397280. hdl:2060/19840008978. S2CID 122763326.
- — (1928). "Zur Theorie des Ferromagnetismus". Z. Phys. 49 (9–10): 619–636. Bibcode:1928ZPhy...49..619H. doi:10.1007/BF01328601. S2CID 122524239.
- —; Pauli, W. (1929). "Zur Quantendynamik der Wellenfelder". Z. Phys. 56 (1): 1–61. Bibcode:1929ZPhy...56....1H. doi:10.1007/BF01340129. S2CID 121928597.
- —; Pauli, W. (1930). "Zur Quantentheorie der Wellenfelder. II". Z. Phys. 59 (3–4): 168–190. Bibcode:1930ZPhy...59..168H. doi:10.1007/BF01341423. S2CID 186219228.
- — (1932). "Über den Bau der Atomkerne. I". Z. Phys. 77 (1–2): 1–11. Bibcode:1932ZPhy...77....1H. doi:10.1007/BF01342433. S2CID 186218053.
- — (1932). "Über den Bau der Atomkerne. II". Z. Phys. 78 (3–4): 156–164. Bibcode:1932ZPhy...78..156H. doi:10.1007/BF01337585. S2CID 186221789.
- — (1933). "Über den Bau der Atomkerne. III". Z. Phys. 80 (9–10): 587–596. Bibcode:1933ZPhy...80..587H. doi:10.1007/BF01335696. S2CID 126422047.
- — (1934). "Bemerkungen zur Diracschen Theorie des Positrons". Zeitschrift für Physik. 90 (3–4): 209–231. Bibcode:1934ZPhy...90..209H. doi:10.1007/BF01333516. S2CID 186232913. The author was cited as being at Leipzig. The paper was received on 21 June 1934.
- — (1936). "Über die 'Schauer' in der Kosmischen Strahlung". Forsch. Fortscher. 12: 341–342.
- —; Euler, H. (1936). "Folgerungen aus der Diracschen Theorie des Positrons". Z. Phys. 98 (11–12): 714–732. Bibcode:1936ZPhy...98..714H. doi:10.1007/BF01343663. S2CID 120354480. The authors were cited as being at Leipzig. The paper was received on 22 December 1935. A translation of this paper has been done by W. Korolevski and H. Kleinert: arXiv:physics/0605038v1.
- — (1936). "Zur Theorie der 'Schauer' in der Höhenstrahlung". Z. Phys. 101 (9–10): 533–540. Bibcode:1936ZPhy..101..533H. doi:10.1007/BF01349603. S2CID 186215469.
- — (1937). "Der Durchgang sehr energiereicher Korpuskeln durch den Atomkern". Die Naturwissenschaften. 25 (46): 749–750. Bibcode:1937NW.....25..749H. doi:10.1007/BF01789574. S2CID 39613897.
- — (1937). "Theoretische Untersuchungen zur Ultrastrahlung". Verh. Dtsch. Phys. Ges. 18: 50.
- — (1938). "Die Absorption der durchdringenden Komponente der Höhenstrahlung". Annalen der Physik. 425 (7): 594–599. Bibcode:1938AnP...425..594H. doi:10.1002/andp.19384250705.
- — (1938). "Der Durchgang sehr energiereicher Korpuskeln durch den Atomkern". Nuovo Cimento. 15 (1): 31–34. Bibcode:1938NCim...15...31H. doi:10.1007/BF02958314. S2CID 123209538. — (1938). "Der Durchgang sehr energiereicher Korpuskeln durch den Atomkern". Verh. Dtsch. Phys. Ges. 19 (2).
- — (1943). "Die beobachtbaren Grössen in der Theorie der Elementarteilchen. I". Z. Phys. 120 (7–10): 513–538. Bibcode:1943ZPhy..120..513H. doi:10.1007/BF01329800. S2CID 120706757.
- — (1943). "Die beobachtbaren Grössen in der Theorie der Elementarteilchen. II". Z. Phys. 120 (11–12): 673–702. Bibcode:1943ZPhy..120..673H. doi:10.1007/BF01336936. S2CID 124531901.
- — (1944). "Die beobachtbaren Grössen in der Theorie der Elementarteilchen. III". Z. Phys. 123 (1–2): 93–112. Bibcode:1944ZPhy..123...93H. doi:10.1007/BF01375146. S2CID 123698415.
- — (1947). "Zur Theorie der Supraleitung". Forsch. Fortschr. 21/23: 243–244. — (1947). "Zur Theorie der Supraleitung". Z. Naturforsch. 2a (4): 185–201. Bibcode:1947ZNatA...2..185H. doi:10.1515/zna-1947-0401.
- — (1948). "Das elektrodynamische Verhalten der Supraleiter". Z. Naturforsch. 3a (2): 65–75. Bibcode:1948ZNatA...3...65H. doi:10.1515/zna-1948-0201.
- —; von Laue, M. (1948). "Das Barlowsche Rad aus supraleitendem Material". Z. Phys. 124 (7–12): 514–518. Bibcode:1948ZPhy..124..514H. doi:10.1007/BF01668888. S2CID 121271077.
- — (1948). "Zur statistischen Theorie der Tubulenz". Z. Phys. 124 (7–12): 628–657. Bibcode:1948ZPhy..124..628H. doi:10.1007/BF01668899. hdl:2060/19930090908. S2CID 186223726.
- — (1948). "On the theory of statistical and isotropic turbulence". Proceedings of the Royal Society A. 195 (1042): 402–406. Bibcode:1948RSPSA.195..402H. doi:10.1098/rspa.1948.0127.
- — (1948). "Bemerkungen um Turbulenzproblem". Z. Naturforsch. 3a (8–11): 434–7. Bibcode:1948ZNatA...3..434H. doi:10.1515/zna-1948-8-1103. S2CID 202047340.
- — (1949). "Production of mesons showers". Nature. 164 (4158): 65–67. Bibcode:1949Natur.164...65H. doi:10.1038/164065c0. PMID 18228928. S2CID 4043099.
- — (1949). "Die Erzeugung von Mesonen in Vielfachprozessen". Nuovo Cimento. 6 (Suppl): 493–7. Bibcode:1949NCim....6S.493H. doi:10.1007/BF02822044. S2CID 122006877.
- — (1949). "Über die Entstehung von Mesonen in Vielfachprozessen". Z. Phys. 126 (6): 569–582. Bibcode:1949ZPhy..126..569H. doi:10.1007/BF01330108. S2CID 120410676.
- — (1950). "On the stability of laminar flow". Proc. International Congress Mathematicians. II: 292–296.
- — (1952). "Bermerkungen zur Theorie der Vielfacherzeugung von Mesonen". Die Naturwissenschaften. 39 (3): 69. Bibcode:1952NW.....39...69H. doi:10.1007/BF00596818. S2CID 41323295.
- — (1952). "Mesonenerzeugung als Stosswellenproblem". Z. Phys. 133 (1–2): 65–79. Bibcode:1952ZPhy..133...65H. doi:10.1007/BF01948683. S2CID 124271377.
- — (1955). "The production of mesons in very high energy collisions". Nuovo Cimento. 12 (Suppl): 96–103. Bibcode:1955NCim....2S..96H. doi:10.1007/BF02746079. S2CID 121970196.
- — (1975). "Development of concepts in the history of quantum theory". American Journal of Physics. 43 (5): 389–394. Bibcode:1975AmJPh..43..389H. doi:10.1119/1.9833. The substance of this article was presented by Heisenberg in a lecture at Harvard University.

== Published books ==
- — (1949) [1930]. The Physical Principles of the Quantum Theory. Translators Eckart, Carl; Hoyt, F.C. Dover. ISBN 978-0-486-60113-7
- — (1953). Nuclear Physics. Philosophical Library.
- — (1955). Das Naturbild der heutigen Physik. Rowohlts Enzyklopädie. Vol. 8. Rowohlt.
- — (1958). Physics and Philosophy. Harper & Rowe.
- — (1966). Philosophic Problems of Nuclear Science. Fawcett.
- — (1971). Physics and Beyond: Encounters and Conversations. Harper & Row. ISBN 9780061316227.
- — (1971). Physics and Beyond: Encounters and Conversations.
- — (1977). Tradition in der Wissenschaft. Reden und Aufsätze. Munich: Piper.
- —; Busche, Jürgen (1979). Quantentheorie und Philosophie: Vorlesungen und Aufsätze. Reclam. ISBN 978-3-15-009948-3.
- — (1979). Philosophical problems of quantum physics. Ox Bow. ISBN 978-0-918024-14-5.
- — (1983). Tradition in Science. Seabury Press.
- — (1988). Physik und Philosophie: Weltperspektiven. Ullstein Taschenbuchvlg.
- — (1989). Encounters with Einstein: And Other Essays on People, Places, and Particles. Princeton University Press. ISBN 978-0-691-02433-2.
- —; Northrop, Filmer (1999). Physics and Philosophy: The Revolution in Modern Science (Great Minds Series). Prometheus.
- — (2002). Der Teil und das Ganze: Gespräche im Umkreis der Atomphysik. Piper. ISBN 978-3-492-22297-6.
- — (1992). Rechenberg, Helmut (ed.). Deutsche und Jüdische Physik. Piper. ISBN 978-3-492-11676-3.
- — (2007). Physik und Philosophie: Weltperspektiven. Hirzel.
- — (2007). Physics and Philosophy: The Revolution in Modern Science. Harper Perennial Modern Classics (reprint ed.). HarperCollins. ISBN 978-0-06-120919-2. (full text of 1958 version)

== Portrayals in fiction ==
Heisenberg is credited with building the atomic bomb used by the Axis in TV series adaptation of the novel The Man in the High Castle. In this story, atomic bombs are referred to as Heisenberg Devices.

Heisenberg was played by Daniel Craig in the 2002 film Copenhagen, an adaptation of Michael Frayn's play, by Christoph Bach in the 2015 TV mini-series The Heavy Water War directed by Per-Olav Sørensen, by Mark Strong in The Catcher Was a Spy, and by Matthias Schweighöfer in the 2023 biopic Oppenheimer.

== See also ==
- List of things named after Werner Heisenberg
- List of German inventors and discoverers
- The Physical Principles of the Quantum Theory
- Haigerloch research reactor
