= Operation Epsilon =

Program of the Allies during World War II

Coordinates: 52°18′57″N 0°10′45″W

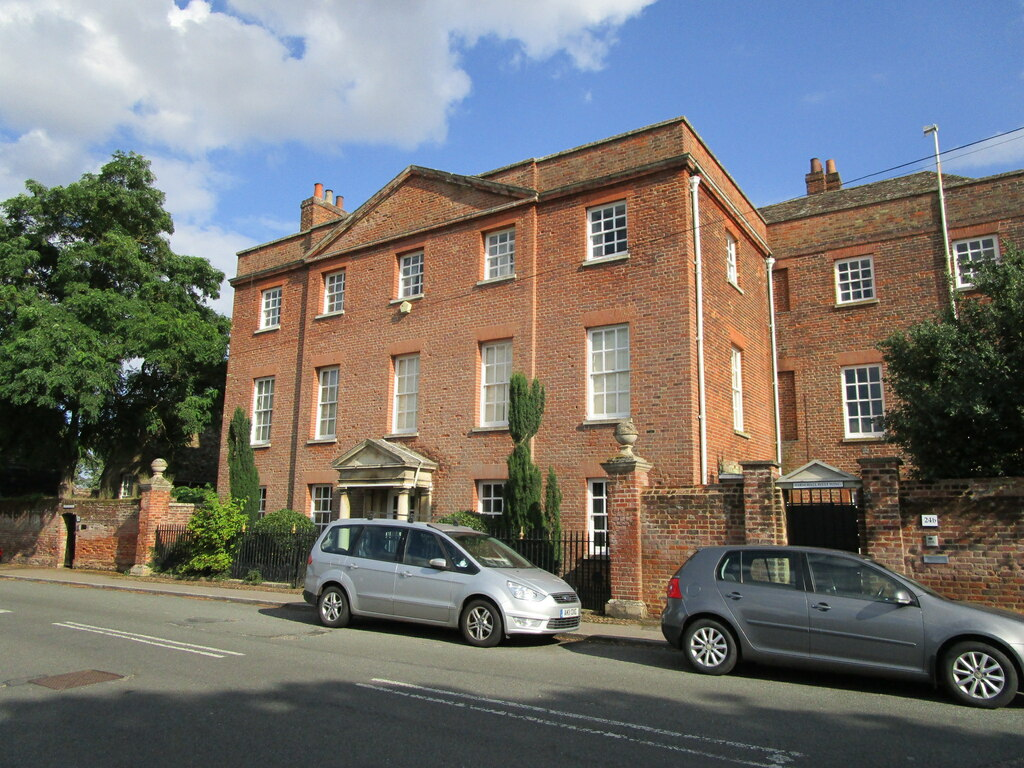
Farm Hall, Godmanchester, near Cambridge

Operation Epsilon was the codename of a program in which Allied forces near the end of World War II detained ten German scientists who were thought to have worked on Nazi Germany's nuclear program. The scientists were captured between 1 May and 30 June 1945, as part of the Allied Alsos Mission, mainly as part of its Operation Big sweep through southwestern Germany.

They were interned at Farm Hall, a bugged house in Godmanchester, Huntingdonshire, England, from 3 July 1945 to 3 January 1946. The primary goal of the program was to determine how close Nazi Germany had been to constructing an atomic bomb by listening to their conversations.

== List of scientists ==
The following German scientists were captured and detained during Operation Epsilon:

- Erich Bagge
- Kurt Diebner
- Walther Gerlach
- Otto Hahn
- Paul Harteck
- Werner Heisenberg
- Horst Korsching
- Max von Laue
- Carl Friedrich von Weizsäcker
- Karl Wirtz

== Background ==
The participants of the Manhattan Project perceived themselves as being in a competition with the Germans, who had a head start due to the discovery of nuclear fission by Otto Hahn in Germany in late 1938.

In 1944, the Alsos Mission, under the scientific leadership of Samuel Goudsmit, was tasked with closely following the Western Allied invading forces to locate and seize individuals, documents, and materials related to the German atomic bomb program. By November 1944, the evidence gathered was sufficient to convince Goudsmit that there was no German atomic bomb under development. Despite this, many individuals, particularly in America, remained skeptical.

The mission continued with a similar objective, primarily for intelligence purposes. Goudsmit hand-picked ten individuals who were apprehended, mostly in Hechingen, by a joint Anglo-American raiding party led by Colonel Boris Pash, the key military figure of Alsos. Hechingen, located on the eastern edge of the Black Forest, was where the majority of the Kaiser Wilhelm Institut für Physik, including an incomplete nuclear reactor pile, had been moved after being bombed out in Berlin.

R. V. Jones proposed that Farm Hall in England, owned by the Secret Service, would be suitable to accommodate the captured individuals. He also recommended installing microphones there before their arrival. This practice had become standard with high-ranking prisoners of war since it had been observed that their private conversations could be more revealing than formal interrogations.

== Transfer to England ==
The scientists captured in Germany by the Alsos Mission were flown to England. Harteck said in a 1967 interview that some scientists had not adjusted to losing their German elite status. When Max von Laue was told they were to fly to England the next day, he said, "Impossible ... tomorrow is my colloquium ... Couldn't you have the airplane come some other time?". Walther Gerlach expected to be respected as the "plenipotentiary for nuclear physics" in Germany; he was shocked when he asked for a glass of water and was told by the guard to "look for an empty can in the trash barrel". Harteck joked with the British officer when he saw the plane taking them to England that if an "accident" was planned they would have used an older plane.

Farm Hall, a country house in Godmanchester, Huntingdonshire (now in Cambridgeshire), had been used by MI6 and SOE for agents who were to be flown into occupied Europe from RAF Tempsford but was vacant. R. V. Jones suggested to Stewart Menzies that German nuclear physicists then held in France at an American internment camp known as 'Camp Dustbin' (partly because he was told that an American general had said that "the best way of dealing with the post-war nuclear physics problem in Germany was to shoot all their nuclear physicists") be included. He also recommended to Menzies, the head of MI6, that the house be fitted with microphones to gauge the physicists' reactions to Allied progress with the dropping of the bomb.

== Farm Hall transcripts ==
On July 6, the microphones picked up the following conversation between Werner Heisenberg and Kurt Diebner, both of whom had worked on the German nuclear project and had been seized as part of the Allied Alsos Mission, Diebner in Berlin and Heisenberg in Urfeld,

Diebner: I wonder whether there are microphones installed here?
Heisenberg: Microphones installed? (laughing) Oh no, they're not as cute as all that. I don't think they know the real Gestapo methods; they're a bit old fashioned in that respect.

All of the scientists expressed shock when informed of the atomic bombing of Hiroshima on 6 August 1945 before supper. Some doubted that the BBC report was genuine. They were told initially of an official announcement that an "atomic bomb" had been dropped on Hiroshima, with no mention of uranium or nuclear fission. When they first heard the news on the BBC "the discussion revolved excitedly about how the United States must have produced Element 93." Otto Hahn, one of those who were grateful that Germany had not built a bomb, chided those who had worked on the German project, saying "An extremely complicated business; for "93" they must have a machine which will run for a long time. If the Americans have an uranium bomb then you're all second-raters. Poor old Heisenberg".

Heisenberg said "Did they use the word uranium in connection with this atomic bomb. When Hahn said "No" Heisenberg said "then it's got nothing to do with atoms ...". Harteck said that he would have understood the words "uranium" or "nuclear (fission) bomb", but he had worked with atomic hydrogen and atomic oxygen and thought that American scientists might have succeeded in stabilising a high concentration of (separate) atoms; such a bomb would have had a tenfold increase over a conventional bomb.

At nine o'clock the guests were assembled to hear the official announcement. They were completely stunned to learn that the news was, in fact true. Immediately intensive discussions began on the magnitude of the American effort, and were most impressed that we were able to accomplish the vast amount of work that they realised we must have done ... ".

The scientists then contemplated how the American bomb was made and why Germany did not produce one. The transcripts seem to indicate that the physicists, in particular Heisenberg, had overestimated in error or deliberately the amount of enriched uranium that an atomic bomb would require, and that the German project was at best in a very early, theoretical stage of thinking about how atomic bombs would work; in fact, it is estimated that they would have never been able to produce the amount they needed in the four years they wanted to create an atomic bomb. Heisenberg specifically thought that the amount of Uranium 235 needed at critical mass was about a thousand times more than what would make an atomic bomb explode.

Some of the scientists indicated that they were happy that they had not been able to build a nuclear bomb for Adolf Hitler, while others more sympathetic to the Nazi party (particularly Gerlach and also Diebner) were dismayed at having failed.

All were physicists except for Hahn and Harteck, who were chemists, and all except Max von Laue had participated in the German nuclear project. During his incarceration in Farm Hall, Hahn was awarded the 1944 Nobel Prize for Chemistry "for his discovery of the fission of heavy nuclei". Hahn accepted the prize but would be unable, for the present, to receive the award in person. Heisenberg later said "Well, how have they actually done it? I find it is a disgrace if we, the professors who have worked on it, cannot at least work out how they did it.

A group of eight people (including Peter Ganz) were led by British Army Major T. H. Rittner, who was assisted by Captain Brodie. They were responsible for eavesdropping, recording, then copying and translating the transcripts. Only relevant technical or political information, about ten percent of all words heard, was recorded, transcribed and translated. The recordings were made with six to eight machines on shellac-coated metal discs. After the selective transcriptions had been made, the discs and recordings were destroyed. The transcripts were sent as reports to London and to the American consulate (which were then forwarded to General Leslie Groves of the Manhattan Project) in 24 reports, over 250 pages. Groves revealed the existence of the transcripts in his 1962 autobiography.

In February 1992 the transcripts were declassified and published.

== Dramatisation of Farm Hall ==
On 24 February 1992 the BBC broadcast a Horizon drama-documentary entitled Hitler's Bomb based on the events at Farm Hall and examining the reasons for the failure of the German nuclear weapons program. The documentary was produced by David Sington with dramatic reconstructions written by Nick Perry.

The events at Farm Hall were dramatised on BBC Radio 4 on 15 June 2010, in Nuclear Reactions, written by Adam Ganz, son of one of the interpreters, Peter Ganz.

A play titled Operation Epsilon by Alan Brody, based on the original transcripts, received its first reading as part of the Catalyst Collaborative at MIT (Boston) in 2008, followed by a workshop reading in New York in 2010, directed by Andy Sandberg and produced by Ellen Berman. Brody and Sandberg subsequently developed the play in a 2011 workshop at the Asolo Repertory Theatre (Sarasota, Florida). Prior to its world premiere production in early 2013 with the Nora Theatre Company at Central Square Theater (Cambridge, Massachusetts).

A further adaptation, Farm Hall by Katherine M. Moar, was performed as a staged reading at the Theatre Royal, Bath on 21 September 2019. It was later revived as a full production directed by Stephen Unwin at Jermyn Street Theatre and the Theatre Royal, Bath in 2023, and as a tour of the same production at Cambridge Arts Theatre, Perth Theatre, Yvonne Arnaud Theatre, Oxford Playhouse and Richmond Theatre later in 2023. Farm Hall transferred to the Theatre Royal Haymarket in London with the original cast for a short run in August 2024. The play received its American premiere with the Topanga Actors Company directed by Judith Hendra, running from 17 January to 2 February 2025 at the Promenade Playhouse in West Los Angeles.

== See also ==
- Trent Park in north London, a similarly bugged house where captured German generals were luxuriously housed during the war and their unguarded conversations monitored
- Latimer House and Wilton Park Estate, similar facilities used to monitor other captured German officers during the war before transferring them to POW camps
- Operation Paperclip
- Combined Services Detailed Interrogation Centre
- Russian Alsos
