= Walther Bothe =

German physicist (1891–1957)

Walter Bothe
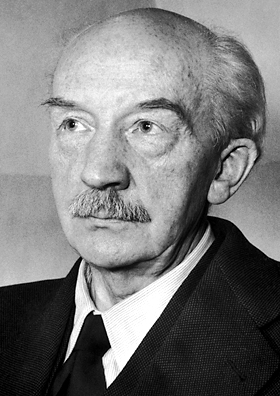
- Bothe in 1954
- Born: Walther Wilhelm Georg Bothe; 8 January 1891; Oranienburg, Kingdom of Prussia, German Empire
- Died: 8 February 1957 (aged 66); Heidelberg, Baden-Württemberg, West Germany
- Education: Friedrich Wilhelm University of Berlin (Dr. phil.)
- Known for: Bothe–Geiger coincidence experiment
- Spouse: Barbara Below (m. 1920)
- Children: 2
- Awards: Max Planck Medal (1953); Nobel Prize in Physics (1954)
- Scientific career
- Fields: Physics
- Workplaces: Physikalisch-Technische Reichsanstalt (1913–1930); University of Giessen (1930–1932); Heidelberg University (1932–1934); Kaiser Wilhelm Institute for Medical Research (1934–1957)
- Doctoral advisor: Max Planck

Walther Wilhelm Georg Bothe (German: [ˈvaltɐ ˈboːtə]; 8 January 1891 – 8 February 1957) was a German experimental physicist who shared the 1954 Nobel Prize in Physics with Max Born "for the coincidence method and his discoveries made therewith".

Bothe served in the military during World War I from 1914 and was a prisoner of war of the Russians, returning to Germany in 1920. Upon his return to the laboratory, he developed and applied coincidence circuits to the study of nuclear reactions, such as the Compton effect, cosmic rays, and the wave–particle duality of radiation.

In 1930, Bothe became full professor and director of the Physics Department at the University of Giessen. In 1932, he became director of the Physical and Radiological Institute at Heidelberg University; he was driven out of this position by elements of the Deutsche Physik movement. To preclude his emigration from Germany, he was appointed director of the Physics Institute of the Kaiser Wilhelm Institute for Medical Research at Heidelberg University. There, he built the first operational cyclotron in Germany. Furthermore, he became a principal in the German nuclear energy project, also known as Uranverein, which was started in 1939 under the supervision of the Army Ordnance Office.

In 1946, in addition to his directorship of the Physics Institute at the KWImf, Bothe was reinstated as a professor at Heidelberg University. From 1956 to 1957, he was a member of the Nuclear Physics Working Group in Germany.

In the year after Bothe's death, his Physics Institute at the KWImF was elevated to the status of a new institute under the Max Planck Society and then became the Max Planck Institute for Nuclear Physics. Its main building was later named Bothe laboratory.

== Education ==
Walther Wilhelm Georg Bothe was born on 8 January 1891 in Oranienburg, Germany. From 1908 to 1912, Bothe studied physics under Max Planck at the Friedrich Wilhelm University of Berlin, receiving his Ph.D. in 1914.

== Career and research ==
=== Early years ===
In 1913, Bothe joined the Physikalisch-Technische Reichsanstalt (PTR – now the Physikalisch-Technische Bundesanstalt), where he stayed until 1930. Hans Geiger had been appointed director of the newly established Laboratory for Radioactivity there in 1912; Bothe was an assistant to Geiger from 1913 to 1920, a scientific member of Geiger's staff from 1920 to 1927, and director of the Laboratory for Radioactivity from 1927 to 1930—in succession to Geiger.

In May 1914, Bothe volunteered for service in the German cavalry. He was taken prisoner by the Russians and incarcerated in Russia for five years. While there, he learned the Russian language and worked on theoretical physics problems related to his doctoral studies. He returned to Germany in 1920, with a Russian bride.

On his return from Russia, Bothe continued his employment at the PTR under Hans Geiger in the Laboratory for Radioactivity. In 1924, Bothe published on his coincidence method. The Bothe–Geiger coincidence experiment studied the Compton effect and the wave–particle duality of light. Bothe's coincidence method and his applications of it earned him the Nobel Prize in Physics in 1954.

In 1925, while still at the PTR, Bothe became a Privatdozent (unsalaried lecturer) at the Friedrich Wilhelm University of Berlin, and in 1929, became an ausserordentlicher Professor (extraordinary professor) there.

In 1927, Bothe began the study of the transmutation of light elements through bombardment with alpha particles. From a joint investigation with H. Fränz and Heinz Pose in 1928, Bothe and Fränz correlated reaction products of nuclear interactions to nuclear energy levels.

In 1929, in collaboration with Werner Kolhörster and Bruno Rossi (who were guests in Bothe's laboratory at the PTR), Bothe began the study of cosmic rays. The study of cosmic radiation would be conducted by Bothe for the rest of his life.

In 1930, Bothe became an ordentlicher Professor (ordinary professor) and director of the Physics Department at the University of Giessen. The same year, Bothe and his collaborator Herbert Becker bombarded beryllium, boron, and lithium with alpha particles from polonium and observed a new form of penetrating radiation. In 1932, James Chadwick identified this radiation as the neutron.

=== Heidelberg ===
In 1932, Bothe succeeded Philipp Lenard as director of the Physical and Radiological Institute at Heidelberg University. It was then that Rudolf Fleischmann became a teaching assistant to Bothe. When Adolf Hitler became Chancellor of Germany on 30 January 1933, the concept of Deutsche Physik (Aryan Physics) took on more favor as well as fervor; it was antisemitic and against theoretical physics, especially against modern physics, including quantum mechanics and both atomic and nuclear physics. As applied in the university environment, political factors took priority over the historically applied concept of scholarly ability, even though its two most prominent supporters were the Lenard and Johannes Stark. Supporters of Deutsche Physik launched vicious attacks against leading theoretical physicists. While Lenard was retired from Heidelberg, he still had significant influence there.

In 1934, Lenard had managed to get Bothe relieved of his directorship of the Physical and Radiological Institute, whereupon Bothe was able to become the director of the Institute for Physics of the Kaiser-Wilhelm-Institut für medizinische Forschung (KWImF – Kaiser Wilhelm Institute for Medical Research) in Heidelberg, replacing Karl W. Hauser, who had recently died. Ludolf von Krehl, director of the KWImF, and Max Planck, president of the Kaiser-Wilhelm-Gesellschaft (KWG – Kaiser Wilhelm Society), had offered the directorship to Bothe to ward off the possibility of his emigration. Bothe held the directorship of the Institute for Physics at the KWImF until his death in 1957. While at the KWImF, Bothe held an honorary professorship at Heidelberg, which he held until 1946. Fleischmann went with Bothe and worked with him there until 1941. To his staff, Bothe recruited scientists, including Wolfgang Gentner, Heinz Maier-Leibnitz – who had done his doctorate with the Nobel Laureate James Franck and was highly recommended by Robert Pohl and Georg Joos – and Arnold Flammersfeld. Also included on his staff were Peter Jensen and Erwin Fünfer.

In 1938, Bothe and Gentner published on the energy dependence of the nuclear photo-effect. This was the first clear evidence that nuclear absorption spectra are accumulative and continuous, an effect known as the dipolar giant nuclear resonance. This was explained theoretically a decade later by physicists J. Hans D. Jensen, Helmut Steinwedel, Peter Jensen, Michael Goldhaber, and Edward Teller.

Also in 1938, Maier-Leibnitz built a cloud chamber. Images from the cloud chamber were used by Bothe, Gentner, and Maier-Leibnitz to publish, in 1940, the Atlas of Typical Cloud Chamber Images, which became a standard reference for identifying scattered particles.

=== First German cyclotron ===
By the end of 1937, the rapid successes Bothe and Gentner had with the building and research uses of a Van de Graaff generator had led them to consider building a cyclotron. By November, a report had already been sent to the president of the KWG, and Bothe began securing funds from the Helmholtz Society, the Baden Ministry of Culture, IG Farben, the KWG, and various other research-oriented agencies. Initial promises led to ordering a magnet from Siemens in September 1938, however, further financing then became problematic. In these times, Gentner continued his research on the nuclear photoeffect, with the aid of the Van de Graaff generator, which had been upgraded to produce energies just under 1 MeV. When his line of research was completed with the ^{7}Li (p, gamma) and the ^{11}B (p, gamma) reactions, and on the nuclear isomer ^{80}Br, Gentner devoted his full effort to the building of the planned cyclotron.

To facilitate the construction of the cyclotron, at the end of 1938 and into 1939, with the help of a fellowship from the Helmholtz Society, Gentner was sent to Radiation Laboratory of the University of California (now the Lawrence Berkeley National Laboratory) in Berkeley, California. As a result of the visit, Gentner formed a cooperative relationship with Emilio G. Segrè and Donald Cooksey.

After the armistice between France and Germany in the summer of 1940, Bothe and Gentner received orders to inspect the cyclotron Frédéric Joliot-Curie had built in Paris. While it had been built, it was not yet operational. In September 1940, Gentner received orders to form a group to put the cyclotron into operation. Hermann Dänzer from the University of Frankfurt am Main participated in this effort. While in Paris, Gentner was able to free both Frédéric Joliot-Curie and Paul Langevin, who had been arrested and detained. At the end of the winter of 1941/1942, the cyclotron was operational with a 7 MeV beam of deuterons. Uranium and thorium were irradiated with the beam, and the byproducts were sent to Otto Hahn at the Kaiser-Wilhelm Institut für Chemie (KWIC – Kaiser Wilhelm Institute for Chemistry), in Berlin. In mid-1942, Gentner's successor in Paris, was Wolfgang Riezler from Bonn.

It was during 1941 that Bothe had acquired all the necessary funding to complete construction of the cyclotron. The magnet was delivered in March 1943, and the first beam of deuteron was emitted in December. The inauguration ceremony for the cyclotron was held on 2 June 1944. While there had been other cyclotrons under construction, Bothe's was the first operational cyclotron in Germany.

=== Uranium Club ===
The German nuclear-energy project, also known as Uranverein (Uranium Club), began in the spring of 1939 under the auspices of the Reichsforschungsrat (RFR – Reich Research Council) of the Reichserziehungsministerium (REM – Reich Ministry of Education). By 1 September, the Heereswaffenamt (HWA – Army Ordnance Office) squeezed out the RFR and took over the effort. Under the control of the HWA, Uranverein had its first meeting on 16 September. The meeting was organized by Kurt Diebner, advisor to the HWA, and held in Berlin. The invitees included Bothe, Siegfried Flügge, Hans Geiger, Otto Hahn, Paul Harteck, Gerhard Hoffmann, Josef Mattauch, and Georg Stetter. A second meeting was held soon thereafter and included Klaus Clusius, Robert Döpel, Werner Heisenberg, and Carl Friedrich von Weizsäcker. With Bothe being one of the principals, Wolfgang Gentner, Arnold Flammersfeld, Rudolf Fleischmann, Erwin Fünfer, and Peter Jensen were soon drawn into work for the Uranverein. Their research was published in Kernphysikalische Forschungsberichte (Research Reports in Nuclear Physics); see § Internal reports below.

For Uranverein, Bothe – and up to 6 members from his staff by 1942 – worked on the experimental determination of atomic constants, the energy distribution of fission fragments, and nuclear cross sections. His erroneous experimental results on the absorption of neutrons in graphite were central in the German decision to favor heavy water as a neutron moderator. His value was too high; one conjecture being that this was due to air between the graphite pieces with the nitrogen having high neutron absorption. However, the experimental setup involved a sphere of Siemens electro-graphite submerged in water, no air being present. The error in fast-neutron cross-section was due to impurities in the Siemens product: "even the Siemens electro-graphite contained barium and cadmium, both ravenous neutron-absorbers". In any event, there were so few staff or groups that they could not repeat experiments to check results, although in fact a separate group at Gottingen, led by Wilhelm Hanle, determined the cause of Bothe's error: "Hanle's own measurements would show that carbon, properly prepared, would in fact work perfectly well as a moderator, but at a cost of production in industrial quantities ruled prohibitive by [German] Army Ordnance".

By late 1941, it was apparent that the nuclear-energy project would not make a decisive contribution to ending the war effort in the near term. HWA control of Uranverein was relinquished to the RFR in July 1942. The nuclear-energy project thereafter maintained its kriegswichtig (important for the war) designation and funding continued from the military. However, the German nuclear-power project was then broken down into the following main areas: uranium and heavy-water production, uranium isotope separation, and the Uranmaschine (uranium machine; i.e., nuclear reactor). Also, the project was then essentially split up between nine institutes, where the directors dominated the research and set their own research agendas. Bothe's Institute for Physics was one of the nine institutes. The other eight institutes or facilities were: the Institute for Physical Chemistry at the Ludwig-Maximilians-Universität München, the HWA Versuchsstelle (testing station) in Gottow, the KWIC, the Physical Chemistry Department of the University of Hamburg, the Kaiser-Wilhelm-Institut für Physik (Kaiser Wilhelm Institute for Physics), the Second Experimental Physics Institute at the University of Göttingen, the Auergesellschaft, and the Second Physical Institute at the University of Vienna.

=== Post-WWII ===
From 1946 to 1957, in addition to his position at the KWImF, Bothe was an ordentlicher Professor at Heidelberg University.

At the end of World War II, the Allies had seized the cyclotron at Heidelberg. In 1949, its control was returned to Bothe.

During 1956 and 1957, Bothe was a member of the Arbeitskreis Kernphysik (Nuclear Physics Working Group) of the Fachkommission II "Forschung und Nachwuchs" (Commission II "Research and Growth") of the Deutschen Atomkommission (German Atomic Energy Commission). Other members of the Nuclear Physics Working Group in both 1956 and 1957 were: Werner Heisenberg (chairman), Hans Kopfermann (vice-chairman), Fritz Bopp, Wolfgang Gentner, Otto Haxel, Willibald Jentschke, Heinz Maier-Leibnitz, Josef Mattauch, Wolfgang Riezler, Wilhelm Walcher, and Carl Friedrich von Weizsäcker. Wolfgang Paul was also a member of the group during 1957.

At the end of 1957, Gentner was in negotiations with Otto Hahn, president of the Max-Planck-Gesellschaft (MPG – Max Planck Society; successor of the Kaiser Wilhelm Society), and with the senate of the MPG to establish a new institute under their auspices. Essentially, Bothe's Institute for Physics at the Max-Planck-Institut für medizinische Forschung (Max Planck Institute for Medical Research) in Heidelberg was to be spun off to become a full-fledged institute of the MPG. The decision to proceed was made in May 1958. Gentner was named the director of the Max-Planck-Institut für Kernphysik (MPIK – Max Planck Institute for Nuclear Physics) on 1 October and also received the position as an ordentlicher Professor at Heidelberg University. Bothe had not lived to see the final establishment of the MPIK, as he had died in February of that year.

Bothe was a German patriot who did not give excuses for his work with Uranverein. However, his impatience with Nazi policies in Germany brought him under suspicion and investigation by the Gestapo.

== Personal life ==
As a result of his incarceration in Russia during World War I as a prisoner of war, Bothe met Barbara Below, whom he married in 1920; they had two children. She preceded him in death by several years.

Bothe was an accomplished painter and musician; he played the piano.

== Awards ==
Year	Organization	Award	Citation	Ref.
1953	(West Germany) German Physical Society	Max Planck Medal	—	
1954	(Sweden) Royal Swedish Academy of Sciences	Nobel Prize in Physics (Note: Shared with Max Born.)	"For the coincidence method and his discoveries made therewith."	

== Works ==
=== Internal reports ===
The following reports were published in Kernphysikalische Forschungsberichte (Research Reports in Nuclear Physics), an internal publication of the German Uranverein. The reports were classified Top Secret, they had very limited distribution, and the authors were not allowed to keep copies. The reports were confiscated under the Allied Operation Alsos and sent to the United States Atomic Energy Commission for evaluation. In 1971, the reports were declassified and returned to Germany. The reports are available at the Karlsruhe Nuclear Research Center and the American Institute of Physics.

- Walther Bothe Die Diffusionsläge für thermische Neutronen in Kohle G12 (7 June 1940)
- Walther Bothe Die Abmessungen endlicher Uranmaschinen G-13 (28 June 1940)
- Walther Bothe Die Abmessungen von Maschinen mit rücksteuendem Mantel G-14 (17 July 1941)
- Walther Bothe and Wolfgang Gentner Die Energie der Spaltungsneutronen aus Uran G-17 (9 May 1940)
- Walther Bothe Einige Eigenschaften des U und der Bremsstoffe. Zusammenfassender Bericht über die Arbeiten G-66 (28 March 1941)
- Walther Bothe and Arnold Flammersfeld Die Wirkungsquerschnitte von 38 für thermische Neutronen aus Diffusionsmessungen G-67 (20 January 1941)
- Walther Bothe and Arnold Flammersfeld Resonanzeinfang an einer Uranoberfläche G-68 (8 March 1940)
- Walther Bothe and Arnold Flammersfeld Messungen an einem Gemisch von 38-Oxyd und –Wasser; der Vermehrungsfakto K unde der Resonanzeinfang w. G-69 (26 May 1941)
- Walther Bothe and Arnold Flammersfeld Die Neutronenvermehrung bei schnellen und langsamen Neutronen in 38 und die Diffusionslänge in 38 Metall und Wasser G-70 (11 July 1941)
- Walther Bothe and Peter Jensen Die Absorption thermischer Neutronen in Elektrographit G-71 (20 January 1941)
- Walther Bothe and Peter Jensen Resonanzeinfang an einer Uranoberfläche G-72 (12 May 1941)
- Walther Bothe and Arnold Flammersfeld Versuche mit einer Schichtenanordnung von Wasser und Präp 38 G-74 (28 April 1941)
- Walther Bothe and Erwin Fünfer Absorption thermischer Neutronen und die Vermehrung schneller Neutronen in Beryllium G-81 (10 October 1941)
- Walther Bothe Maschinen mit Ausnutzung der Spaltung durch schnelle Neutronen G-128 (7 December 1941)
- Walther Bothe Über Stahlenschutzwäne G-204 (29 June 1943)
- Walther Bothe Die Forschungsmittel der Kernphysik G-205 (5 May 1943)
- Walther Bothe and Erwin Fünfer Schichtenversuche mit Variation der U- und D_{2}O-Dicken G-206 (6 December 1943)
- Fritz Bopp, Walther Bothe, Erich Fischer, Erwin Fünfer, Werner Heisenberg, O. Ritter, and Karl Wirtz Bericht über einen Versuch mit 1.5 to D_{2}O und U und 40 cm Kohlerückstreumantel (B7) G-300 (3 January 1945)

=== Selected literature ===
- Walther Bothe and Hans Geiger Ein Weg zur experimentellen Nachprüfung der Theorie von Bohr, Kramers und Slater, Z. Phys. Volume 26, Number 1, 44 (1924)
- Walther Bothe Theoretische Betrachtungen über den Photoeffekt, Z. Phys. Volume 26, Number 1, 74–84 (1924)
- Walther Bothe and Hans Geiger Experimentelles zur Theorie von Bohr, Kramers und Slater, Die Naturwissenschaften Volume 13, 440–441 (1925)
- Walther Bothe and Hans Geiger Über das Wesen des Comptoneffekts: ein experimenteller Beitrag zur Theories der Strahlung, Z. Phys. Volume 32, Number 9, 639–663 (1925)
- W. Bothe and W. Gentner Herstellung neuer Isotope durch Kernphotoeffekt, Die Naturwissenschaften Volume 25, Issue 8, 126–126 (1937). Received 9 February 1937. Institutional affiliation: Institut für Physik at the Kaiser-Wilhelm Institut für medizinische Forschung.
- Walther Bothe The Coincidence Method, The Nobel Prize in Physics 1954, Nobelprize.org (1954)

=== Books ===
- Walther Bothe Der Physiker und sein Werkzeug (Gruyter, 1944)
- Walther Bothe and Siegfried Flügge Kernphysik und kosmische Strahlen. T. 1 (Dieterich, 1948)
- Walther Bothe Der Streufehler bei der Ausmessung von Nebelkammerbahnen im Magnetfeld (Springer, 1948)
- Walther Bothe and Siegfried Flügge (editors) Nuclear Physics and Cosmic Rays FIAT Review of German Science 1939–1945, Volumes 13 and 14 (Klemm, 1948)
- Walther Bothe Theorie des Doppellinsen-b-Spektrometers (Springer, 1950)
- Walther Bothe Die Streuung von Elektronen in schrägen Folien (Springer, 1952)
- Walther Bothe and Siegfried Flügge Kernphysik und kosmische Strahlen. T. 2 (Dieterich, 1953)
- Karl H. Bauer and Walther Bothe Vom Atom zum Weltsystem (Kröner, 1954)

== See also ==
- Elastic recoil detection
- German inventors and discoverers

== Bibliography ==
- Beyerchen, Alan D. (1977). Scientists Under Hitler: Politics and the Physics Community in the Third Reich. Yale University Press. ISBN 0-300-01830-4.
- Hentschel, Klaus; Hentschel, Ann M., eds. (1996). Physics and National Socialism: An Anthology of Primary Sources. Birkhäuser. ISBN 0-8176-5312-0.
- Walker, Mark (1993). German National Socialism and the Quest for Nuclear Power 1939–1949. Cambridge: Cambridge University Press. ISBN 0-521-43804-7.
