= Kernphysikalische Forschungsberichte =

Journal

Kernphysikalische Forschungsberichte (Research Reports in Nuclear Physics) was an internal publication of the German Uranverein, which was initiated under the Heereswaffenamt (Army Ordnance Office) in 1939; in 1942, supervision of the Uranverein was turned over to the Reichsforschungsrat under the Reichserziehungsministerium. Reports in this publication were classified Top Secret, they had very limited distribution, and the authors were not allowed to keep copies. The reports were confiscated under the Allied Operation Alsos and sent to the United States Atomic Energy Commission for evaluation. In 1971, the reports were declassified and returned to Germany. Many of the reports are available at the Karlsruhe Nuclear Research Center and the Niels Bohr Library of the American Institute of Physics. Many of them are reprinted and transcribed in the book "Collected Works / Gesammelte Werke" listed below which is available in most libraries. There are reports numbered G-1 to G-395.

Prominent German scientists who published reports in Kernphysikalische Forschungsberichte as members of the Uranverein can be grouped as follows:

- Nine of the ten German nuclear physicists, except for Max von Laue, incarcerated in England at the close of World War II under Operation Epsilon: Erich Bagge, Kurt Diebner, Walther Gerlach, Otto Hahn, Paul Harteck, Werner Heisenberg, Horst Korsching, Carl Friedrich von Weizsäcker, and Karl Wirtz.
- German physicists sent to Russia to work on the Soviet atomic bomb project: Robert Döpel, Walter Herrmann, Heinz Pose, Nikolaus Riehl, and Karl Zimmer.
- Others: Fritz Bopp, Walther Bothe, Wolfgang Finkelnburg, Siegfried Flügge, Hans Geiger, Karl-Heinz Höcker, Fritz Houtermans, Georg Joos, Horst Korsching, Carl Ramsauer, Fritz Sauter, and Fritz Strassmann.

== See also ==
- Russian Alsos

== Bibliography ==
- Hentschel, Klaus, editor and Ann M. Hentschel, editorial assistant and Translator Physics and National Socialism: An Anthology of Primary Sources (Birkhäuser, 1996)
- Walker, Mark German National Socialism and the Quest for Nuclear Power 1939–1949 (Cambridge, 1993) ISBN 0-521-43804-7
- Werner Heisenberg, W. Blum, H. P. Durr, H. Rechenberg "Collected Works / Gesammelte Werke" (Springer, 1985) ISBN 0-387-13400-X
