= Karl Wirtz =

German physicist (1910–1994)

Karl Eugen Julius Wirtz (24 April 1910 – 12 February 1994) was a German nuclear physicist, born in Cologne. He was arrested by the allied British and American Armed Forces and incarcerated at Farm Hall for six months in 1945 under Operation Epsilon.

== Education ==
From 1929 to 1934, Wirtz studied physics, chemistry, and mathematics at the University of Bonn, the Albert Ludwigs University of Freiburg, and the University of Breslau. He received his doctorate in 1934 under C. Schäfer. From 1935 to 1937, he was a teaching assistant to Carl-Friedrich Bonhoeffer at the University of Leipzig. During this period, he became a member of the Nationalsozialistischer Lehrerbund (NSLB, National Socialist Teachers League), but not the Nationalsozialistische Deutsche Arbeiterpartei (NSDAP, National Socialist German Workers Party).

Some of the more established scientists, such as Max von Laue, could demonstrate more autonomy than the younger and less established scientists. This was, in part, due to political organizations, such as the Nationalsozialistischer Deutscher Dozentenbund (NSDDB, National Socialist German University Lecturers League), whose district leaders had a decisive role in the acceptance of an Habilitationsschrift, which was a prerequisite to attaining the rank of Privatdozent necessary to becoming a university lecturer. Hence joining such organizations became a tactical career consideration. In 1938, he completed his Habilitation at the Humboldt University of Berlin with a Habilitationsschrift on the electrochemical foundations of electrolytic heavy water production.

== Career ==
In 1937, Wirtz became a staff scientist at the Kaiser Wilhelm Institute for Physics, an institute under the Kaiser-Wilhelm-Gesellschaft ) and located in Dahlem-Berlin. In 1940, he worked on the horizontal layer reactor design with Fritz Bopp and Erich Fischer. In 1941, he also became a Privatdozent at the Humboldt University of Berlin.

In 1944, Wirtz was appointed head of the experimental department at the KWIP, which had been moved to Hechingen in 1943 to avoid bombing casualties to the personnel. In late spring 1945, Wirtz was arrested by the allied British and American Armed Forces and incarcerated at Farm Hall for six months under Operation Epsilon.

From 1946, Wirtz worked at the Max-Planck Institut für Physik, which was the renamed Kaiser Wilhelm Institute for Physics and had been opened in the British Occupation Zone in Göttingen.

From 1948 to 1957, he was also an extraordinarius professor at the University of Göttingen. From 1950, he also became a scientific member of the Kaiser-Wilhelm-Gesellschaft. From 1957 to 1979, Wirtz was an ordinarius professor of physical foundations of reactor technology at the Technische Hochschule Karlsruhe and director of the Institute of Neutron Physics and Reactor Technology at the Center for Nuclear Research, which was established in 1957 in Karlsruhe. From 1965 to 1967, he was chairman of the scientific council of the Karlsruhe Center for Nuclear Research. From 1974 to 1976, he was dean of the faculty of mechanical engineering at Technische Hochschule Karlsruhe.

== Organizations ==
- 1966 – 1968: Executive Vice President of the European Atomic Energy Society and consultant to the West German Government in affairs related to the Nuclear Non-Proliferation Treaty.
- 1972 – 1977: Member of the presiding committee of the Deutsches Atomforum (Atomic Forum).

== Internal Reports ==
The following reports were published in Kernphysikalische Forschungsberichte (Research Reports in Nuclear Physics), an internal publication of the German Uranverein. The reports were classified Top Secret, they had very limited distribution, and the authors were not allowed to keep copies. The reports were confiscated under the Allied Operation Alsos and sent to the United States Atomic Energy Commission for evaluation. In 1971, the reports were declassified and returned to Germany. The reports are available at the Karlsruhe Nuclear Research Center and the American Institute of Physics.

- Erica Cremer and Karl Wirtz Untersuchungen des Schwerwassergehaltes einiger technischer Elektrolyseure in Deutschland G-21 (21 June 1940)
- Karl Wirtz Bericht II. Eine 10-stufige Elektrolyseuranlage zur Gewinnung von schwerem Wasser G-61 (19 January 1940)
- Fritz Bopp, Erich Fischer, Werner Heisenberg, Carl-Friedrich von Weizsäcker, and Karl Wirtz Untersuchungen mit neuen Schichtenanordnungen aus U-metall und Paraffin G-127 (March 1942)
- Werner Heisenberg, Fritz Bopp, Erich Fischer, Carl-Friedrich von Weizsäcker, and Karl Wirtz Messungen an Schichtenanordnungen aus 38-Metall und Paraffin G-162 (30 October 1942)
- Karl Wirtz Die elektrolytische Schwerwassergewinnung in Norwegen G-198 (26–28 February 1942)
- Karl Wirtz Einrichtung der Elektrolyse zur Aufbearbeitung von schwerem Wasser G-296 (8 August 1944)
- Fritz Bopp, Walther Bothe, Erich Fischer, Erwin Fünfer, Werner Heisenberg, O. Ritter, and Karl Wirtz Bericht über einen Versuch mit 1.5 to D_{2}O und U und 40 cm Kohlerückstreumantel (B7) G-300 (3 January 1945)

== Selected Literature ==
- Horst Korsching and Karl Wirtz Trennung von Flüssigkeitsgemischen mittels kombinierter Thermodiffusion und Thermosiphonwirkung: Methode von Clusius und Dickel, Naturwissenschaften Volume 27, Number 7, Page 110 (February, 1939)

== Books ==
- Horst Korsching and Karl Wirtz Trennung der Zinkisotope durch Thermodiffusion in flussiger Phase (Verlag der Akademie der Wissenschaften, 1939)
- Karl Heinrich Beckurts and Karl Wirtz Neutron Physics (Springer-Verlag, New York, NY, 1964)
- Karl Winnacker and Karl Wirtz Das unverstandene Wunder: Kernenergie in Deutschland (Econ, 1975) ISBN 3-430-19792-9
- Karl Winnacker and Karl Wirtz Atome Illusion ou Miracle? (P.U.F., 1977)
- Karl Wirtz Lectures on Fast Reactors (Universität Karlsruhe, 1978, 1982)
- Karl Winnacker and Karl Wirtz Nuclear Energy in Germany (American Nuclear Society, 1993) ISBN 0-89448-018-9

== Bibliography ==
- Bernstein, Jeremy Hitler’s Uranium Club: The Secret Recording’s at Farm Hall (Copernicus, 2001) ISBN 0-387-95089-3
- Hentschel, Klaus, editor and Ann M. Hentschel, editorial assistant and Translator Physics and National Socialism: An Anthology of Primary Sources (Birkhäuser, 1996) ISBN 0-8176-5312-0
- Hoffmann, Dieter Between Autonomy and Accommodation: The German Physical Society during the Third Reich, Physics in Perspective 7(3) 293-329 (2005)
- Mark Walker German National Socialism and the Quest for Nuclear Power 1939-1949 (Cambridge, 1993) ISBN 0-521-36413-2
