= Abraham Esau =

German physicist (1884–1955)

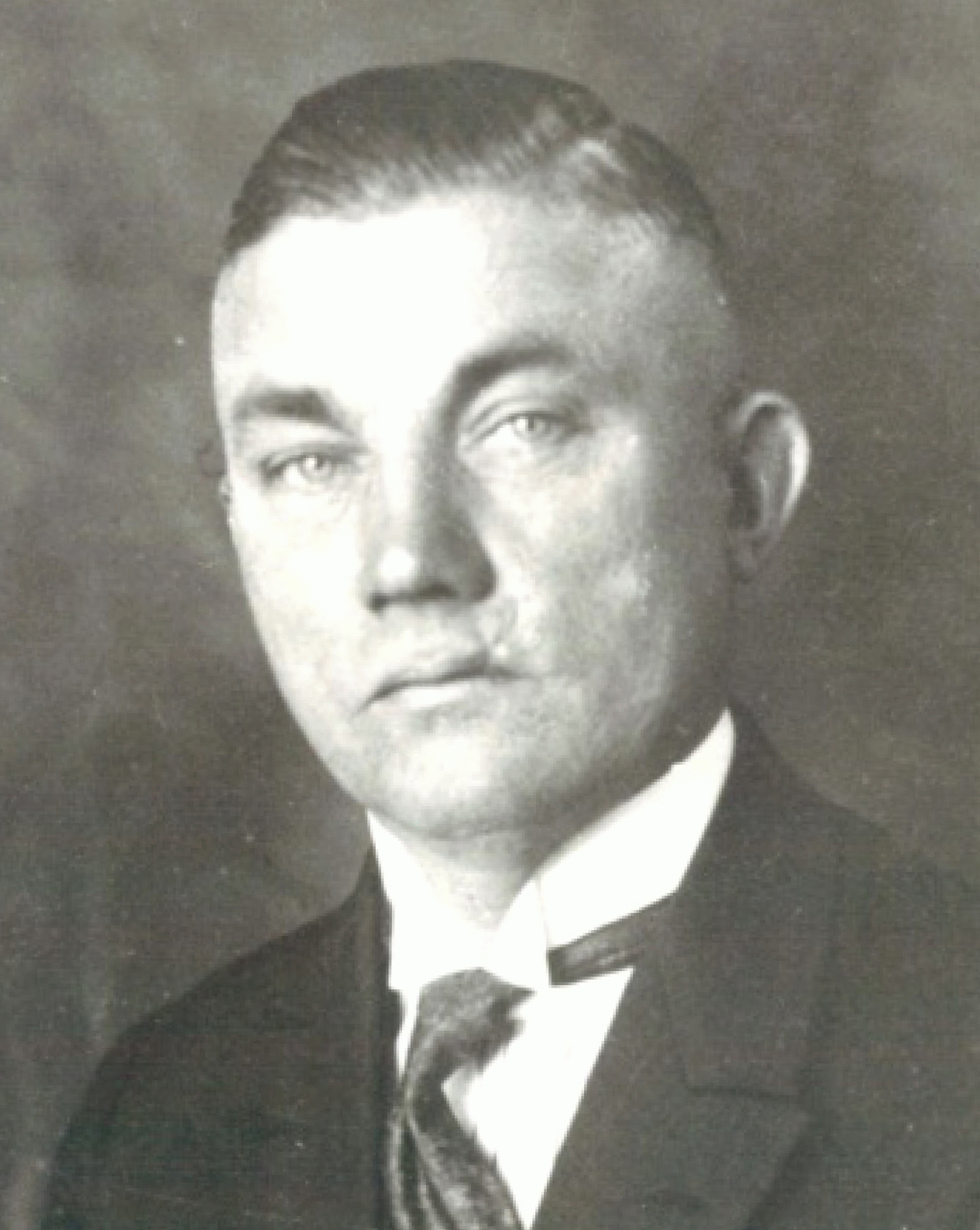
- Born: 7 June 1884; Landkreis Marienburg, West Prussia
- Died: 12 May 1955 (aged 70); Düsseldorf, North Rhine-Westphalia Province
- Education: University of Berlin
- Known for: German nuclear program
- Scientific career
- Fields: Physics
- Workplaces: Halle-Wittenberg University; Telefunken Laboratory; Reich Research Council; University of Jena; Physikalisch-Technische Bundesanstalt; RWTH Aachen University

Robert Abraham Esau (7 June 1884 – 12 May 1955) was a German physicist.

After receipt of his doctorate from the University of Berlin, Esau worked at Telefunken, where he pioneered very high frequency (VHF) waves used in radar, radio, and television, and he was president of the Deutscher Telefunken Verband. During World War I, he was a prisoner of war of the French; he was repatriated to Germany in 1919. In 1925, he was appointed professor at the University of Jena, where he also served as rector. From 1933, Esau was the State Councilor in Thuringia.

From 1937, Esau was head of the physics section of the newly created Reich Research Council (RFR). From 1939, he was a professor at the University of Berlin and president of the Reich Physical and Technical Institute. From his position in the RFR, he initiated the first meeting of the Uranium Club in early 1939, the precursor to the Army Ordnance Office (HWA) German nuclear energy project, which began in September of that year. When the HWA gave control of the project to the RFR in 1942, Esau became the plenipotentiary of nuclear physics and was in control of the project. In 1944, Esau became the plenipotentiary of the high-frequency engineering and radar working group.

During World War II, Esau was one of the most powerful physicists in Germany. After World War II until 1948, Esau was a prisoner of war of the Dutch. From 1949, Esau was a visiting professor of short-wave technology at the RWTH Aachen. From 1953, he was also head of the Institute of High-Frequency Engineering of the German Aeronautical Research Institute.

== Education ==
Esau was born in Tiegenhagen (Tujec) in Landkreis Marienburg, West Prussia. He was the son of Prussian Mennonites, Osar Abraham Esau (1861–1945) and Maria Agnes (Regier) Esau (1861–1892). From 1902 to 1907, Esau studied at the Friedrich-Wilhelms-Universität (today, the Humboldt University of Berlin) and the Königliche Technische Hochschule zu Danzig (today, Gdańsk University of Technology). From 1906 to 1909, he was a teaching assistant to Max Wien at Danzig. He received his doctorate at the University of Berlin in 1908.

== Career ==
=== Early years ===
From 1909 to 1910, Esau was a volunteer at the radio transmission division of the Berlin telegraph battalion. From 1910 to 1912, he was teaching assistant at the Martin-Luther-Universität Halle-Wittenberg. From 1914, he was on active duty with the German military in Togo; he became a prisoner of war of the French and did not return to Germany until 1918.

From 1912 to 1925, Esau served as laboratory chairman of the Gesellschaft für drahtlose Telegraphie (Wireless Telegraph Society) in Berlin. During this time, at Telefunken, he pioneered very high frequency (VHF) waves used in radar, radio, and television. In 1921 and 1922, he had stays in Argentina and Brazil. From 1925, Esau was president of the Deutscher Telefunken Verband.

In 1925, Esau began his association with the Friedrich Schiller University of Jena. From 1925 to 1927, he was an extraordinarius professor of technical physics, and from 1927 to 1939, he was an ordinarius professor of technical physics and director of the department of technical physics. He was rector there from 1932 to 1935 and in 1937. Dr. Esau was also the advisor of Dr. Lothar Rohde and Dr. Hermann Schwarz, who later founded the company Rohde & Schwarz, in 1933 during their doctorate in Friedrich Schiller University of Jena.

In October 1933, Esau became a Staatsrat (State Councilor) in Thuringia, a position he held until the end of World War II. This role gave him direct access to Adolf Hitler.

On the initiative of Erich Schumann, the Reichsforschungsrat (RFR, Reich Research Council) was inaugurated on 16 March 1937 by Reich Minister Bernhard Rust of the Reichserziehungsministerium (REM, Reich Education Ministry). The RFR was set up to centralize planning for all basic and applied research in Germany, with the exception of aeronautical research, which was under the supervision of Reich Marshal Hermann Göring. Support for research was decided by the heads of 13 special sections of the RFR (Fachspatenleiter). Esau was a member of the RFR from its inception, and he was head of the physics section (Fachspatenleiter für Physik), which included mathematics, astronomy, and meteorology. From this position in the RFR, he would play major roles in the German nuclear energy project, sometimes also referred to as the Uranverein (Uranium Club).

In 1938, Esau was appointed Professor of Military Telecommunications Technology in the Faculty of Military Engineering, which had recently been founded at the Technische Hochschule Berlin (today, the Technische Universität Berlin), in Berlin-Charlottenburg.

From 1939 to 1945, Esau was ordinarius professor at the University of Berlin and president of the Physikalisch-Technische Reichsanstalt (PTR, Reich Physical and Technical Institute; today, the Physikalisch-Technische Bundesanstalt). At the same time he was a visiting lecturer at the Technische Akademie Bergisch-Land (Technical Academy of Bergisches Land). Additionally, for this same period, Esau was president of the Deutsche Gemeinschaft zur Erhaltung und Förderrung der Forschung (German Association for the Support and Advancement of Scientific Research), also known for short as the Deutsche Forschungs-Gemeinschaft (DFG), which had before 1937 been known as the Notgemeinschaft der Deutschen Wissenschaft (NG; Emergency Association of German Science).

=== World War II and the Uranverein ===
Shortly after the discovery of nuclear fission in December 1938/January 1939, the Uranverein, i.e., the German nuclear energy project, had an initial start in April before being formed a second time under the Heereswaffenamt (HWA, Army Ordnance Office) in September.

==== First Uranverein ====
Paul Harteck was director of the physical chemistry department at the University of Hamburg and an advisor to the Heereswaffenamt (HWA, Army Ordnance Office). On 24 April 1939, along with his teaching assistant Wilhelm Groth, Harteck made contact with the Reichskriegsministerium (RKM, Reich Ministry of War) to alert them to the potential of military applications of nuclear chain reactions. Two days earlier, on 22 April 1939, after hearing a colloquium paper by Wilhelm Hanle on the use of uranium fission in a Uranmaschine (uranium machine, i.e., nuclear reactor), Georg Joos, along with Hanle, notified Wilhelm Dames, at the Reichserziehungsministerium (REM, Reich Ministry of Education), of potential military applications of nuclear energy. The communication was given to Abraham Esau, head of the physics section of the Reichsforschungsrat (RFR, Reich Research Council) at the REM. On 29 April, a group, organized by Esau, met at the REM to discuss the potential of a sustained nuclear chain reaction. The group included the physicists Walther Bothe, Robert Döpel, Hans Geiger, Wolfgang Gentner (probably sent by Walther Bothe), Wilhelm Hanle, Gerhard Hoffmann, and Georg Joos; Peter Debye was invited, but he did not attend. After this, informal work began at the Georg-August University of Göttingen by Joos, Hanle, and their colleague Reinhold Mannfopff; the group of physicists was known informally as the first Uranverein (Uranium Club) and formally as Arbeitsgemeinschaft für Kernphysik. The group's work was discontinued in August 1939, when the three were called to military training.

==== Second Uranverein ====
The second Uranverein began after the Heereswaffenamt squeezed out the Reichsforschungsrat of the Reichserziehungsministerium and started the formal German nuclear energy project under military auspices. The second Uranverein was formed on 1 September 1939, the day World War II began, and it had its first meeting on 16 September 1939. The meeting was organized by Kurt Diebner, advisor to the HWA, and held in Berlin. The invitees included Walther Bothe, Siegfried Flügge, Hans Geiger, Otto Hahn, Paul Harteck, Gerhard Hoffmann, Josef Mattauch, and Georg Stetter. A second meeting was held soon thereafter and included Klaus Clusius, Robert Döpel, Werner Heisenberg, and Carl Friedrich von Weizsäcker. Also at this time, the Kaiser-Wilhelm Institut für Physik (KWIP, Kaiser Wilhelm Institute for Physics, after World War II the Max Planck Institute for Physics), in Berlin-Dahlem, was placed under HWA authority, with Diebner as the administrative director, and the military control of the nuclear research commenced.

When it was apparent that the nuclear energy project would not make a decisive contribution to ending the war effort in the near term, control of the KWIP was returned in January 1942 to its umbrella organization, the Kaiser-Wilhelm Gesellschaft (KWG, Kaiser Wilhelm Society, after World War II the Max-Planck Gesellschaft), and HWA control of the project was relinquished to the RFR in July 1942. The nuclear energy project thereafter maintained its kriegswichtig (important for the war) designation and funding continued from the military.

On 9 June 1942, Adolf Hitler issued a decree for the reorganization of the RFR as a separate legal entity under the Reichsministerium für Bewaffnung und Munition (RMBM, Reich Ministry for Armament and Ammunition, after autumn 1943 the Reich Ministry for Armament and War Production); the decree appointed Reich Marshal Hermann Göring as the president. The reorganization was done under the initiative of Reich Minister for Armament and Ammunition Albert Speer; it was necessary as the RFR under Minister Bernhard Rust was ineffective and not achieving it purpose. It was the hope that Göring would manage the RFR with the same discipline and efficiency as he had in the aviation sector. On 8 December 1942, Abraham Esau was appointed as Hermann Göring's Bevollmächtiger (plenipotentiary) for nuclear physics research under the RFR – at this point, Esau was in charge of the German nuclear energy project. At the end of 1943, Esau resigned as plenipotentiary of nuclear physics; in December, Walther Gerlach replaced him as plenipotentiary for nuclear physics and as head of the physics section of the RFR. As of 1 January 1944, Esau, replacing Johannes Plendl, became the plenipotentiary of the high-frequency engineering and radar working group (A. G. Hochfrequenzphysik). In the final analysis, placing the RFR under Göring's administrative control had little effect on the German nuclear energy project.

Over time, the HWA and then the RFR controlled the German nuclear energy project. The most influential people were Erich Schumann, Abraham Esau, Walther Gerlach, and Kurt Diebner. During World War II, Esau was one of the most powerful and influential physicists in Germany. Even after Esau left his position as plenipotentiary for nuclear physics and head of the physics section at the RFR at the end of 1942, he continued to have significant authority and influence as president of the Physikalisch-Technische Reichsanstalt, as is attested to by the fact that he was able to continue research efforts for the Urainverein under the highest priority level for urgent development projects (Dringlichkeitsentwicklung, DE).

=== Post-World War II ===
After the war, the Americans turned Esau over to the Dutch to stand trial for his involvement in the plunder of research facilities of the electronics firm Philips. He was acquitted and expelled in 1948. Later, he was tried and convicted in absentia; without a conviction, the Dutch could not make a legal claim for damages from Germany.

Thanks to support from Leo Brandt, a science policy-maker of North Rhine-Westphalia, Esau was able to establish himself back into the German scientific community. From 1949, Esau was a visiting professor of short-wave technology at the RWTH Aachen University. From 1953, he was also head of the Institute of High-Frequency Engineering of the German Aeronautical Research Institute in Mülheim an der Ruhr.

Esau died in Düsseldorf.

== Honors ==
In 1954, he received an honorary doctorate from the Albert-Ludwigs-Universität Freiburg for his work on diathermy.

In 1954 the science policy-maker of North Rhine-Westphalia, Leo Brant, nominated Esau for a medal of distinction. The award was not made, due to the intervention of the physicist Max von Laue, who pointed out Esau's prominent role as a chief representative of National Socialism.

== Internal reports ==
The following reports were published in Kernphysikalische Forschungsberichte (Research Reports in Nuclear Physics), an internal publication of the German Uranverein. The reports were classified Top Secret, they had very limited distribution, and the authors were not allowed to keep copies. The reports were confiscated under the Allied Operation Alsos and sent to the United States Atomic Energy Commission for evaluation. In 1971, the reports were declassified and returned to Germany. The reports are available at the Karlsruhe Nuclear Research Center and the American Institute of Physics.

- Abraham Esau Herstellung von Leuchtfarben ohne Anwendung von Radium G-213 (5 May 1943)
- Abraham Esau Einleitung G-214 (5 May 1943)

== Books ==
- Abraham Esau, Weltnachrichtenverkehr und Weltnachrichtenmonopole (Fischer, 1932)
- Abraham Esau, 375 Jahre Universität Jena (Fischer, 1933)
- Abraham Esau, Die Entwicklung der deutschen drahtlosen Nachrichtentechnik (Fischer, 1934)
- Abraham Esau, Einführung zu den Berichten der Herren Frhr von Handel und Plendl (Oldenbourg, 1939)
- Abraham Esau, Elektrische Wellen im Zentimetergebiet (Oldenbourg, 1940)
- Abraham Esau, Werner von Siemens (de Gruyter, 1943)
- Abraham Esau, Ortung mit elektrischen und Ultraschallwellen in Technik und Natur (Westdeutscher Verlag, 1953)
- Abraham Esau, Der Ultraschall und seine technischen Anwendungen (Westdeutscher Verlag, 1955)
