= Klaus Clusius =

German chemist (1903–1963)

- Born: 19 March 1903; Breslau, German Empire
- Died: 28 May 1963 (aged 60); Zurich, Switzerland
- Education: Technische Hochschule Breslau (BSc), (Ph.D.)
- Known for: Research in Chemical Physics
- Awards: Marcel-Benoist-Preis (1958)
- Scientific career
- Fields: Chemical Physics
- Workplaces: University of Zurich
- Doctoral advisor: Arnold Eucken (Technische Hochschule Breslau)

Klaus Paul Alfred Clusius (19 March 1903 – 28 May 1963) was a German physical chemist. During World War II, he worked on the German nuclear energy project, also known as the Uranium Club; he worked on isotope separation techniques and heavy water production. After the war, he was a professor of physical chemistry at the University of Zurich.

== Life and education ==
Clusius was born on 19 March 1903 in Breslau, Silesia, German Empire (now Wrocław, Poland). He studied at the Technische Hochschule Breslau (today the Wrocław University of Science and Technology) from 1922 to 1926. He received his doctorate in 1926, under Arnold Eucken, who was the director of the physicochemical institute there; his thesis was on the specific heat of solids at low temperatures. From 1926 to 1929, he was Eucken's teaching assistant. From 1929 to 1930, under a Rockefeller Foundation Fellowship, he did postdoctoral studies and research at the University of Oxford, with Cyril Norman Hinshelwood, and at Leiden University. He completed his Habilitation, in 1931, at the Georg August University of Göttingen under Eucken, who had been the director of the physicochemical institute there since 1929. He then became Eucken's teaching assistant.

He died in Zurich on 28 May 1963.

== Career ==
In 1934, Clusius became an ausserordentlicher Professor (extraordinarius professor) at the University of Würzburg. From 1936, he was an ordentlicher Professor at the Ludwig-Maximilians-Universität München. At that time or later, he became Director of the Physikalisch-Chemisches Institut der Universität München (Physical Chemistry Institute of the Ludwig-Maximilians-Universität München). At the University, he conducted major experiments on heavy water, and he developed a thermodiffusion isotope separation tube, in 1938, with his younger colleague Gerhard Dickel.

In December 1938, the German chemists Otto Hahn and Fritz Strassmann sent a manuscript to Naturwissenschaften reporting they had detected the element barium after bombarding uranium with neutrons; simultaneously, they communicated these results to Lise Meitner, who had in July of that year fled to The Netherlands and then went to Sweden. Meitner, and her nephew Otto Robert Frisch, correctly interpreted these results as being nuclear fission. Frisch confirmed this experimentally on 13 January 1939.

Paul Harteck was director of the physical chemistry department at the University of Hamburg and an advisor to the Heereswaffenamt (HWA, Army Ordnance Office). On 24 April 1939, along with his teaching assistant Wilhelm Groth, Harteck made contact with the Reichskriegsministerium (RKM, Reich Ministry of War) to alert them to the potential of military applications of nuclear chain reactions. Two days earlier, on 22 April 1939, after hearing a colloquium paper by Wilhelm Hanle on the use of uranium fission in a Uranmaschine (uranium machine, i.e., nuclear reactor), Georg Joos, along with Hanle, notified Wilhelm Dames, at the Reichserziehungsministerium (REM, Reich Ministry of Education), of potential military applications of nuclear energy. The communication was given to Abraham Esau, head of the physics section of the Reichsforschungsrat (RFR, Reich Research Council) at the REM. On 29 April, a group, organized by Esau, met at the REM to discuss the potential of a sustained nuclear chain reaction. The group included the physicists Walther Bothe, Robert Döpel, Hans Geiger, Wolfgang Gentner (probably sent by Walther Bothe), Wilhelm Hanle, Gerhard Hoffmann, and Georg Joos; Peter Debye was invited, but he did not attend. After this, informal work began at Göttingen by Joos, Hanle, and their colleague Reinhold Mannfopff; the group of physicists was known informally as the first Uranverein (Uranium Club) and formally as Arbeitsgemeinschaft für Kernphysik. The group's work was discontinued in August 1939, when the three were called to military training.

The second Uranverein began after the HWA squeezed out the RFR of the REM and started the formal German nuclear energy project under military auspices. The second Uranverein was formed on 1 September 1939, the day World War II began, and it had its first meeting on 16 September 1939. The meeting was organized by Kurt Diebner, former student of Gerhard Hoffmann the University of Halle and advisor to the HWA, and held in Berlin. The invitees included Walther Bothe, Siegfried Flügge, Hans Geiger, Otto Hahn, Paul Harteck, Gerhard Hoffmann, Josef Mattauch, and Georg Stetter. A second meeting was held soon thereafter and included Klaus Clusius, Robert Döpel, Werner Heisenberg, and Carl Friedrich von Weizsäcker. Also at this time, the Kaiser-Wilhelm Institut für Physik (KWIP, Kaiser Wilhelm Institute for Physics, after World War II the Max Planck Institute for Physics), in Berlin-Dahlem, was placed under HWA authority, with Diebner as the administrative director, and the military control of the nuclear research commenced.

In 1939, Clusius and Dickel announced the separation of chlorine isotopes, an accomplishment which had been sought for decades. That same year, Clusius, Paul Harteck, Rudolf Fleischmann, Wilhelm Groth and others initiated experiments with the Clusius-Dickel thermodiffusion isotope separation tube with uranium hexafluoride. In 1942, with about four physical chemists, Clusius further explored isotope separation and conducted experiments on heavy water production problems.

During World War II, Clusius gave talks outside of the Third Reich, just as did Werner Heisenberg.

From 1947 to 1963, Clusius was an ordinarius professor of physical chemistry at the University of Zurich. The research he directed included the separation and enrichment of stable isotopes, among them those of rare gases (except for helium) using cascaded Clusius-Dickel separation columns. These isotopes, which were in much demand, were supplied to a number of research laboratories. Further research was high-precision calorimetry, elucidation of chemical reaction pathways using 15-nitrogen, electrochemical and low temperature fractionation methods for large scale production of nitrogen and oxygen isotopes. His research activities in Zurich are best described in. Clusius mentored a large number of graduate students and postdoctoral associates, among them several with future careers in academia. Among these was Ernst Schumacher, who became a professor at the University of Bern, where he in turn mentored a large number of students and associates. Another student was Horst Meyer (physicist) professor at Duke University. Among the postdoctoral assistants was Michael Hoch, who became professor of Chemical Engineering at the University of Cincinnati.

== Honors ==
Clusius received honors which included:

- 1958 – Marcel-Benoist-Preis
- Member of the Deutsche Akademie der Naturforscher Leopoldina
- Honorary doctorate from the Technische Hochschule Hannover

== Internal reports ==
The following reports were published in Kernphysikalische Forschungsberichte ('Research Reports in Nuclear Physics'), an internal publication of the German Uranverein. The reports were classified Top Secret, they had very limited distribution, and the authors were not allowed to keep copies. The reports were confiscated under the Allied Operation Alsos and sent to the United States Atomic Energy Commission for evaluation. In 1971, the reports were declassified and returned to Germany. The reports are available at the Karlsruhe Nuclear Research Center and the American Institute of Physics.

- Klaus Clusius I. Bericht über Trennversuche von Metallionen mit Hilfe des Nernstschen Verteilungssatzes G-18 (1 June 1940)
- Klaus Clusius and M. Maierhauser II. Bericht G-19 (28 July 1940)
- Klaus Clusius, Gerhard Dickel, and M. Maierhauser III. Bericht G-20 (13 January 1941)
- Klaus Clusius, M. Maierhauser, and Gerhard Dickel Bericht über die im Jahre 1940/41 ausgeführten Versuche zur Entwicklung eines Auswaschverfahrens zur Isotopentrennung G-73 (1941)
- Klaus Clusius, Gerhard Dickel, and Ludwig Waldmann Über die Beeinflussung des Wirkungsgrades von Draht-Trennrohren durch Zentrierung und Einbaur von Scheiben G-132 (20 February 1942)
- Klaus Clusius and M. Maierhauser Über die Weiterentwicklung des Verfahrens zur Isotopentrennung mittels des Nernst’schen Verteilungssatzes G-133 (March 1942)
- Klaus Clusius and Kurt Starke Zur Gewinnung von schwerem Wasser G-134 (24 February 1942)
- Klaus Clusius and Kurt Starke Zur Theorie der franktionierten Destillation von H_{2}-HD-D_{2} Gemischen G-189 (29 June 1942)
- Klaus Clusius Isotopentrennung G-207 (5 May 1943)
- Kurt Diebner, Werner Czulius, W. Herrmann, Georg Hartwig, F. Berkei and E. Kamin Über die Neutronenvermehrung einer Anordnung aus Uranwürfeln und schwerem Wasser (G III) G-210

== Selected literature ==
- K. Clusius and C. N. Hinshelwood Homogeneous Catalysis of Gaseous Reactions. Part I. The Decomposition of Isopropyl Ether under the Influence of Halides, Proceedings of the Royal Society of London. Series A, Containing Papers of a Mathematical and Physical Character, Volume 128, No. 807, 75–81 (1930)
- Klaus Clusius and Gerhard Dickel Neues Verfahren zur Gasentmischung und Isotopentrennung, Die Naturwissenschaften Volume 26, 546 (1938)
- Klaus Clusius and Gerhard Dickel Zur Trennung der Chlorisotope, Die Naturwissenschaften Volume 27, 148 (1939)
- Klaus Clusius and Gerhard Dickel Das Trennrohrverfahren bei Flüssigkeiten, Die Naturwissenschaften Volume 27, 148–149 (1939)
- G. Böhm and K. Clusius, Die Struktur aufsteigender H_{2}-O_{2}-Flammen, Zeitschrift für Naturforschung A Inhaltsverzeichnis Band 3a, Heft 7, 386–391 (1948)
- K. Clusius and H. Haimerl, Variationen zum chemischen Austauschverfahren, Anreicherung von ^{34}S, Zeitschrift für Naturforschung A Inhaltsverzeichnis Band 3a, Heft 8–11, 611–616 (1948)
- Klaus Clusius Flüssiger Wasserstoff, Neujahrsblätter der Naturforschenden Gesellschaft in Zürich Number 158 (1956). Institutional citation: Physikalisch-chemisches Institut der Universität Zürich

== Bibliography ==
- Hentschel, Klaus (editor) and Ann M. Hentschel (editorial assistant and translator) Physics and National Socialism: An Anthology of Primary Sources (Birkhäuser, 1996) ISBN 0-8176-5312-0
- Kant, Horst Werner Heisenberg and the German Uranium Project / Otto Hahn and the Declarations of Mainau and Göttingen, Preprint 203 (Max-Planck Institut für Wissenschaftsgeschichte, 2002)
- Walker, Mark German National Socialism and the Quest for Nuclear Power 1939–1949 (Cambridge, 1993) ISBN 0-521-43804-7
