= Wilhelm Groth =

German physical chemist (1904–1977)

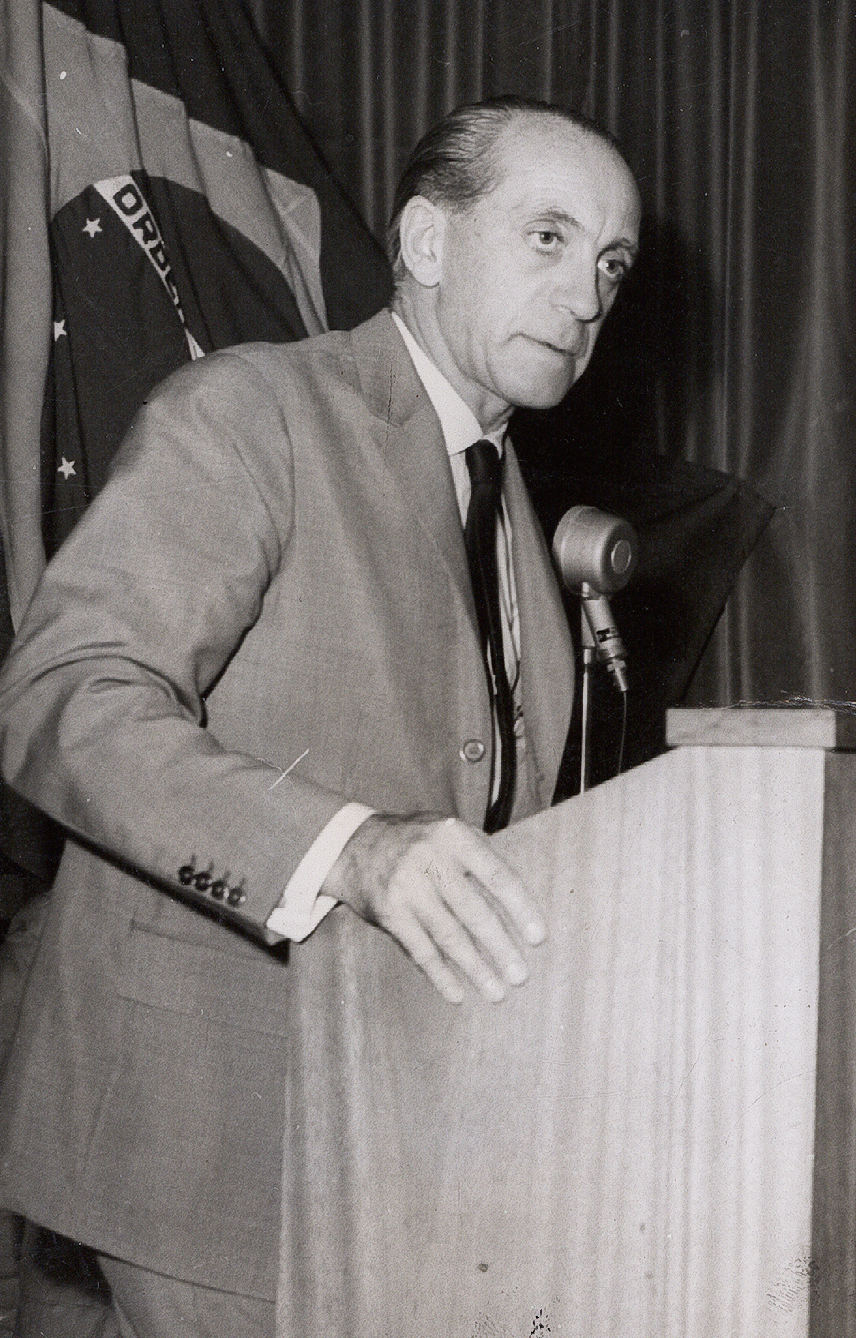
Wilhelm Groth, in a trip to Brazil.

Wilhelm Groth (9 January 1904 – 20 February 1977) was a German physical chemist. Groth was born and raised in Hamburg. During World War II, he worked on the German nuclear energy project, also known as the Uranium Club; his main activity was the development of centrifuges for the enrichment of uranium. After the war, he was a professor of physical chemistry at the University of Hamburg. In 1950, he became director of the Institute of Physical Chemistry at the University of Bonn. He was a principal in the 1956 shipment of three centrifuges for uranium enrichment to Brazil.

He died at the age of 73 in Bonn.

== Education ==
From 1922 to 1927, Groth studied at the Technische Hochschule München, the Ludwig-Maximilians-Universität München, and the University of Tübingen. He received his doctorate in 1927 under Walther Gerlach at the University of Tübingen. His thesis was on the determination of electromechanical equivalents.

== Career ==
In 1927, Groth became a teaching assistant at the Technische Hochschule Hannover, today Leibniz University Hannover.

In 1932, Groth became an assistant to Otto Stern and Paul Harteck at the Institut für Physikalische Chemie (Institute for Physical Chemistry) at the University of Hamburg. He completed his Habilitation at Hamburg at the end of 1938, following complicated negotiations with Hamburg district leadership of the Nationalsozialistischer Deutscher Dozentenbund (NSDDB, National Socialist German University Lecturers League).

Shortly after the discovery of nuclear fission in December 1938/January 1939, the Uranverein, i.e., the German nuclear energy project, had an initial start in April before being formed a second time under the Heereswaffenamt (HWA, Army Ordnance Office) in September.

Paul Harteck was director of the physical chemistry department at the University of Hamburg and an advisor to the Heereswaffenamt (HWA, Army Ordnance Office). On 24 April 1939, along with his teaching assistant Wilhelm Groth, Harteck made contact with the Reichskriegsministerium (RKM, Reich Ministry of War) to alert them to the potential of military applications of nuclear chain reactions and point out its political significance. Two days earlier, on 22 April 1939, after hearing a colloquium paper by Wilhelm Hanle on the use of uranium fission in a Uranmaschine (uranium machine, i.e., nuclear reactor), Georg Joos, along with Hanle, notified Wilhelm Dames, at the Reichserziehungsministerium (REM, Reich Ministry of Education), of potential military applications of nuclear energy. The communication was given to Abraham Esau, head of the physics section of the Reichsforschungsrat (RFR, Reich Research Council) at the REM. On 29 April, a group, organized by Esau, met at the REM to discuss the potential of a sustained nuclear chain reaction. The group included the physicists Walther Bothe, Robert Döpel, Hans Geiger, Wolfgang Gentner (probably sent by Walther Bothe), Wilhelm Hanle, Gerhard Hoffmann, and Georg Joos; Peter Debye was invited, but he did not attend. After this, informal work began at the Georg-August University of Göttingen by Joos, Hanle, and their colleague Reinhold Mannfopff; the group of physicists was known informally as the first Uranverein (Uranium Club) and formally as Arbeitsgemeinschaft für Kernphysik. The group's work was discontinued in August 1939, when the three were called to military training.

The second Uranverein began after the Heereswaffenamt squeezed out the Reichsforschungsrat of the Reichserziehungsministerium and started the formal German nuclear energy project under military auspices. The second Uranverein was formed on 1 September 1939, the day World War II began, and it had its first meeting on 16 September 1939. The meeting was organized by Kurt Diebner, advisor to the HWA, and held in Berlin. The invitees included Walther Bothe, Siegfried Flügge, Hans Geiger, Otto Hahn, Paul Harteck, Gerhard Hoffmann, Josef Mattauch, and Georg Stetter. A second meeting was held soon thereafter and included Klaus Clusius, Robert Döpel, Werner Heisenberg, and Carl Friedrich von Weizsäcker. Also at this time, the Kaiser-Wilhelm Institut für Physik (KWIP, Kaiser Wilhelm Institute for Physics, after World War II the Max Planck Institute for Physics), in Berlin-Dahlem, was placed under HWA authority, with Diebner as the administrative director, and the military control of the nuclear research commenced.

As a principal in the Uranverein, Harteck brought many of his colleagues at Hamburg into the project's activities; this included Groth. At the end of 1939, Groth tested simultaneously with Rudolf Fleischmann the Clusius-Dickel isotope separation process on uranium hexafluoride, with negative results. In the autumn of 1941, Groth, Harteck, and Albert Suhr began the construction of an ultracentrifuge for the enrichment of uranium-235. The construction was done under the auspices of an Heereswaffenamt contract let by Kurt Diebner. The Anschütz & Co. G.m.b.H., a gyroscope firm in Kiel, was a participant in the project; at Anschütz, Konrad Beyerle was in charge of centrifuge research and development. In 1943, enrichment to 5% was achieved, however, technical difficulties hindered large-scale production. The Anschütz corporation told Groth that for mass production they would require many more mechanics and engineers. In 1945 Groth was captured by T-Force, a British Army unit established to locate German scientists. The officer who captured Groth was Brian Urquhart.

After 1945, Groth was appointed nichtplanmäßiger Professor (supernumerary professor) of physical chemistry at Hamburg University, with permission of the British occupation government; from 1948, he was an ausserordentlicher Professor (extraordinarius professor) there. From 1950, occupying the new created Lehrstuhl für physikalische Chemie (chair of physical chemistry), he was head of the Department of Physical Chemistry and an ordentlicher Professor (ordinarius professor) at Rheinische Friedrich-Wilhelms-Universität Bonn. He was a motivating force behind the building and the design of the Institut für Physikalische Chemie (Institute for Physical Chemistry), and when it was completed at the end of 1954 he became its director. He was Rektor (Rector) of the University from 1956 to 1966.

Founded in 1956, Groth was one of the founding fathers of the Kernforschungsanlage Jülich (today, the Jülich Research Centre (Forschungszentrum Jülich), and he was the second chairman (Vorsitzender) of its Scientific Council. Between 1961 and 1969, he established the Institut für Physikalische Chemie (Institute for Physical Chemistry) there.

In 1953, Admiral Alvaro Alberto, the first president of Brazil's National Research Council, met with Wilhelm Groth, Otto Hahn, and Paul Harteck, at the Institute of Physics in Hamburg. An agreement was made to ship three centrifuges for uranium enrichment, along with supporting equipment, to Brazil. The shipment was to include components from 14 German companies. Initially, the shipment was thwarted by orders of James Conant, U.S. High Commissioner to Germany. The shipment, however, was finally made in 1956, under the auspices of the University of São Paulo in Brazil.

== Honors ==
- 1970 – Großes Verdienstkreuz (Great Cross of Merit) of the Verdienstorden der Bundesrepublik Deutschland (Order of Merit of the Federal Republic of Germany)

== Internal reports ==
The following reports were published in Kernphysikalische Forschungsberichte (Research Reports in Nuclear Physics), an internal publication of the German Uranverein. The reports were classified Top Secret, they had very limited distribution, and the authors were not allowed to keep copies. The reports were confiscated under the Allied Operation Alsos and sent to the United States Atomic Energy Commission for evaluation. In 1971, the reports were declassified and returned to Germany. The reports are available at the Karlsruhe Nuclear Research Center and the American Institute of Physics.

- Wilhelm Groth Stand der Arbeiten zur Trennung der Isotope 235U und 238U G-33 (5 June 1940)
- Wilhelm Groth Stand der Arbeiten zur Herstellung einer Ultrazentrifuge G-82 (14 December 1941)
- Wilhelm Groth Stand der Arbeiten zur Trennung der Isotope des Präparats 38 G-83 (December 1941)
- Wilhelm Groth Trennung der Uranisotope nach dem Ultrazentrifugenverfahren. I. Anreichereung der Xenonisotope in einer einstufigen Ultrazentrifuge G-146 (27 June 1942)
- Wilhelm Groth Die Trennung der Uranisotope nach dem Trennohr- und dem Ultrazentrifugenverfahren G-147 (23 March 1942)
- Wilhelm Groth and Albert Suhr Trennung der Uranisotope nach dem Ultrazentrifugenverfahren G-149 (17 August 1942)

== Books by Groth ==
- Konrad Beyerle, Wilhelm Groth, Paul Harteck, and Johannes Jensen Über Gaszentrifugen: Anreicherung der Xenon-, Krypton- und der Selen-Isotope nach dem Zentrifugenverfahren (Chemie, 1950); cited in Walker, 1993, 278.

== Bibliography ==
- Hentschel, Klaus (Editor) and Ann M. Hentschel (Editorial Assistant and Translator) Physics and National Socialism: An Anthology of Primary Sources (Birkhäuser, 1996)
- Macrakis, Kristie Surviving the Swastika: Scientific Research in Nazi Germany (Oxford, 1993)
- Walker, Mark German National Socialism and the Quest for Nuclear Power 1939–1949 (Cambridge, 1993) ISBN 0-521-43804-7
- Warneck, Peter and Hanns von Weyssenhoff Zum 100. Geburtstag von Wilhelm Groth, Bunsen-Magazin Volume 6, Number 2, 36-37 (2004)
