= Wilhelm Hanle =

German physicist (1901–1993)

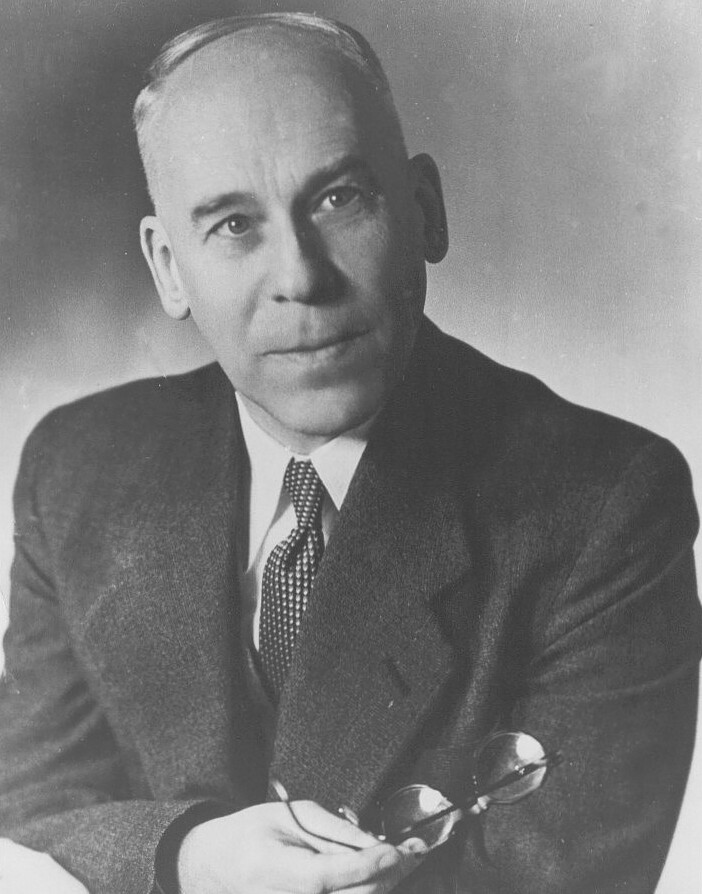
- Born: 3 January 1901; Mannheim, Württemberg, German Empire
- Died: 29 April 1993 (aged 92); Giessen, Hesse, Germany
- Citizenship: Germany
- Education: Heidelberg University; University of Göttinge
- Known for: Hanle effect Deutschen Atomwaffen programme
- Scientific career
- Fields: Physics
- Workplaces: University of Göttingen; University of Tübingen; University of Halle-Wittenberg; University of Jena; University of Giessen

Wilhelm Hanle (13 January 1901 – 29 April 1993) was a German experimental physicist. He is known for the Hanle effect. During World War II, he made contributions to the German nuclear energy project, also known as the Uranium Club. From 1941 until emeritus status in 1969, he was an ordinarius professor of experimental physics and held the chair of physics at the University of Giessen.

== Education ==
Hanle was born in Mannheim. From 1919 to 1924, he studied at the Ruprecht-Karls-Universität Heidelberg and the Georg-August-Universität Göttingen. Philipp Lenard, Director of the Physikalische Institut (Physics Institute) at Heidelberg, had a dictatorial attitude towards his students and colleagues, and Hanle had a conflict with Lenard. Hanle transferred to Göttingen. In 1923, Hanle conducted an experiment which demonstrated the variation of polarization of the resonance fluorescent light from a mercury vapor in a weak magnetic field; this became known as the "Hanle effect". He received his doctorate at Göttingen in 1924, under James Franck, who as Director of the II. Physikalisches Institut (Second Physical Institute).

== Career ==
Hanle was a teaching assistant at the University of Göttingen in 1924 and at the Eberhard-Karls-Universität Tübingen in 1925. He was at the Martin-Luther-Universität Halle-Wittenberg from 1926 to 1929, and, upon completion of his Habilitation, he became a Privatdozent (unpaid lecturer) there in 1927. From 1929, he was an ausserordentlicher Professor (extraordinarius professor) and head of the physics department at the Friedrich-Schiller-Universität Jena.

At Jena, Georg Joos was professor of theoretical physics, but in 1935, he made a compulsory transfer to head the Second Physical Institute at Göttingen to replace James Franck, who had resigned as a result of the Law for the Restoration of the Professional Civil Service in 1933. Hanle and Joos would soon be part of the impetus to initiate the German nuclear energy project, shortly after Hanle went to Göttingen. From 1937 to 1941, Hanle was again at the University of Göttingen.

In December 1938, the German chemists Otto Hahn and Fritz Strassmann sent a manuscript to Naturwissenschaften reporting they had detected the element barium after bombarding uranium with neutrons; simultaneously, they communicated these results to Lise Meitner, who had in July of that year fled to The Netherlands and then went to Sweden. Meitner, and her nephew Otto Robert Frisch, correctly interpreted these results as being nuclear fission. Frisch confirmed this experimentally on 13 January 1939.

Paul Harteck was director of the physical chemistry department at the University of Hamburg and an advisor to the Heereswaffenamt (HWA, Army Ordnance Office). On 24 April 1939, along with his teaching assistant Wilhelm Groth, Harteck made contact with the Reichskriegsministerium (RKM, Reich Ministry of War) to alert them to the potential of military applications of nuclear chain reactions. Two days earlier, on 22 April 1939, after hearing a colloquium paper by Hanle on the use of uranium fission in a Uranmaschine (uranium machine, i.e., nuclear reactor), Georg Joos, along with Hanle, notified Wilhelm Dames, at the Reichserziehungsministerium (REM, Reich Ministry of Education), of potential military applications of nuclear energy. The communication was given to Abraham Esau, head of the physics section of the Reichsforschungsrat (RFR, Reich Research Council) at the REM. On 29 April, a group, organized by Esau, met at the REM to discuss the potential of a sustained nuclear chain reaction. The group included the physicists Walther Bothe, Robert Döpel, Hans Geiger, Wolfgang Gentner (probably sent by Walther Bothe), Wilhelm Hanle, Gerhard Hoffmann, and Georg Joos; Peter Debye was invited, but he did not attend. After this, informal work began at Göttingen by Joos, Hanle, and their colleague Reinhold Mannfopff; the group of physicists was known informally as the first Uranverein (Uranium Club) and formally as Arbeitsgemeinschaft für Kernphysik. The group's work was discontinued in August 1939, when the three were called to military training.

The second Uranverein began after the HWA squeezed out the RFR of the REM and started the formal German nuclear energy project under military auspices. The second Uranverein was formed on 1 September 1939, the day World War II began, and it had its first meeting on 16 September 1939. The meeting was organized by Kurt Diebner, advisor to the HWA, and held in Berlin. The invitees included Walther Bothe, Siegfried Flügge, Hans Geiger, Otto Hahn, Paul Harteck, Gerhard Hoffmann, Josef Mattauch, and Georg Stetter. A second meeting was held soon thereafter and included Klaus Clusius, Robert Döpel, Werner Heisenberg, and Carl Friedrich von Weizsäcker. Also at this time, the Kaiser-Wilhelm Institut für Physik (KWIP, Kaiser Wilhelm Institute for Physics, after World War II the Max Planck Institute for Physics), in Berlin-Dahlem, was placed under HWA authority, with Diebner as the administrative director, and the military control of the nuclear research commenced.

Hanle contributed to the Uranverein under the auspices of the HWA with experimental studies which showed that boron and cadmium were strong absorbers of thermal neutrons.

From 1941 to 1969, Hanle was an ordentlicher Professor (ordinarius professor) of experimental physics and held the chair of physics at the Justus Liebig-Universität Gießen. Hanle made significant contributions to the rebuilding of the university after World War II.

== Honors ==
Hanle received a number of honors, including:

- 1970 – Honorary Doctor of Engineering from the University of Stuttgart
- 1987 – Honorary Senator of the University of Giessen for his work in reconstruction of the university after World War II

== Internal Report ==
The following was published in Kernphysikalische Forschungsberichte (Research Reports in Nuclear Physics), an internal publication of the German Uranverein. Reports in this publication were classified Top Secret, they had very limited distribution, and the authors were not allowed to keep copies. The reports were confiscated under the Allied Operation Alsos and sent to the United States Atomic Energy Commission for evaluation. In 1971, the reports were declassified and returned to Germany. The reports are available at the Karlsruhe Nuclear Research Center and the American Institute of Physics.

- Wilhelm Hanle Über den Nachweis von Bor und Cadmium in Kohle G-85 (18 April 1941)

== Books ==
- Wilhelm Hanle Die Erde im Strahlungsfeld von Sonne und Kosmos (Schmitz, 1948)
- Wilhelm Hanle Atomenergie (Schmitz, 1949)
- Wilhelm Hanle Künstliche Radioaktivität (Piscator-Verl., 1952)
- Ulrich Jetter and Wilhelm Hanle Atomwaffen, Anwendung, Wirkungsweise, Schutzmassnahmen (Physik-Verl., 1952)
- Karl Lindackers, Wilhelm Hanle, and Max Pllermann Praktische Durchführung von Abschirmungsberechnungen (Hanser, Carl GmbH + Co., 1962)
- Wilhelm Hanle Isotopentechnik (Thiemig, 1964)
- Wilhelm Hanle, Martin Oberhofer, and Wolfgang Jacobi Strahlenschutzpraxis. T. 3. Umgang mit Strahlern (Thiemig, 1968)
- Wilhelm Hanle and Max Pollermann Isotopentechnik. Anwendung von Radionukliden und stabilen Nukliden (Hanser, Carl GmbH + Co., 1976)
- Wilhelm Hanle Isotopentechnik. Anwendung von Radionukliden und stabilen Nukliden (K. Thiemig, Muenchen, 1982)
- Werner Heisenberg, Robert Döpel, Wilhelm Hanle, and Käthe Mitzenheim Werner Heisenberg in Leipzig 1927–1942. (Wiley-VCH Weinheim 1993)
- Wilhelm Hanle, Memoiren. (I. Physikalisches Institut, Justus-Liebig-Universität Gießen, 1989)

== Bibliography ==
- Hentschel, Klaus (editor) and Ann M. Hentschel (editorial assistant and translator) Physics and National Socialism: An Anthology of Primary Sources (Birkhäuser, 1996) ISBN 0-8176-5312-0
- Kant, Horst Werner Heisenberg and the German Uranium Project / Otto Hahn and the Declarations of Mainau and Göttingen, Preprint 203 (Max-Planck Institut für Wissenschaftsgeschichte, 2002)
- Mokler, Paul Wilhelm Hanle on his 90th birthday, Journal Zeitschrift für Physik D Volume 18, Number 1, 1–2 (1991)
- Reimann, Bruno W. Wilhelm Hanle (1901–1993), Physiker, Nazi-Forscher, Ehrensenator der JLU Gießen. In: www.bruno-w-reimann.de
- Walker, Mark German National Socialism and the Quest for Nuclear Power 1939–1949 (Cambridge, 1993) ISBN 0-521-43804-7
- Winnewisser, Brenda P., interviewer. Oral history interview with Wilhelm Hanle, 1979 May 23 May to 2 June. American Institute of Physics (1979)
