= Gerhard Hoffmann (physicist) =

German nuclear physicist (1880–1945)

Gerhard Hoffmann (4 August 1880 – 18 June 1945) was a German nuclear physicist. During World War II, he contributed to the German nuclear energy project, also known as the Uranium Club.

== Education ==
Hoffmann studied at the University of Göttingen, the University of Leipzig, and the University of Bonn. He received his doctorate at Bonn, in 1906, under Walter Kaufmann. In 1908, he became Kaufmann's teaching assistant at the University of Königsberg, where he completed his Habilitation in pure and applied physics in 1911.

== Career ==
In 1917, Hoffmann became an Ausserordentlicher Professor and worked on precision measurement of radioactivity and research in cosmic rays. From 1928 to 1937, as successor to Gustav Hertz, he was Ordentlicher Professor at the University of Halle-Wittenberg. In 1937 he succeeded Peter Debye and became ordinarius professor of experimental physics at the University of Leipzig, a position he held until his death in 1945.

In December 1938, the German chemists Otto Hahn and Fritz Strassmann sent a manuscript to Naturwissenschaften reporting they had detected the element barium after bombarding uranium with neutrons; simultaneously, they communicated these results to Lise Meitner, who had in July of that year fled to the Netherlands and then went to Sweden. Meitner, and her nephew Otto Robert Frisch, correctly interpreted these results as being nuclear fission. Frisch confirmed this experimentally on 13 January 1939.

Paul Harteck was director of the physical chemistry department at the University of Hamburg and an advisor to the Heereswaffenamt (HWA, Army Ordnance Office). On 24 April 1939, along with his teaching assistant Wilhelm Groth, Harteck made contact with the Reichskriegsministerium (RKM, Reich Ministry of War) to alert them to the potential of military applications of nuclear chain reactions. Two days earlier, on 22 April 1939, after hearing a colloquium paper by Wilhelm Hanle on the use of uranium fission in a Uranmaschine (uranium machine, i.e., nuclear reactor), Georg Joos, along with Hanle, notified Wilhelm Dames, at the Reich Ministry of Science, Education and Culture, of potential military applications of nuclear energy. The communication was given to Abraham Esau, head of the physics section of the Reichsforschungsrat at the REM. On 29 April, a group, organized by Esau, met at the REM to discuss the potential of a sustained nuclear chain reaction. The group included the physicists Walther Bothe, Robert Döpel, Hans Geiger, Wolfgang Gentner (probably sent by Walther Bothe), Wilhelm Hanle, Gerhard Hoffmann, and Georg Joos; Peter Debye was invited, but he did not attend. After this, informal work began at Göttingen by Joos, Hanle, and their colleague Reinhold Mannfopff; the group of physicists was known informally as the first Uranverein (Uranium Club) and formally as Arbeitsgemeinschaft für Kernphysik. The group's work was discontinued in August 1939, when the three were called to military training.

The second Uranverein began after the HWA squeezed out the RFR of the REM and started the formal German nuclear energy project under military auspices. The second Uranverein was formed on 1 September 1939, the day World War II began, and it had its first meeting on 16 September 1939. The meeting was organized by Kurt Diebner, former student of Hoffmann at the University of Halle and advisor to the HWA, and held in Berlin. The invitees included Walther Bothe, Siegfried Flügge, Hans Geiger, Otto Hahn, Paul Harteck, Gerhard Hoffmann, Josef Mattauch, and Georg Stetter. A second meeting was held soon thereafter and included Klaus Clusius, Robert Döpel, Werner Heisenberg, and Carl Friedrich von Weizsäcker. Also at this time, the Kaiser-Wilhelm Institut für Physik (KWIP, Kaiser Wilhelm Institute for Physics, after World War II the Max Planck Institute for Physics), in Berlin-Dahlem, was placed under HWA authority, with Diebner as the administrative director, and the military control of the nuclear research commenced.

Hoffmann made contributions to the Uranverein in the area of cyclotrons as a nuclear research tool. He was among the first in Germany to propose and arrange financing for the construction of a cyclotron. His arrangements in 1937 were through the Reichsforschungsrat; the cyclotron would eventually be installed at the University of Leipzig. Hoffmann had gone to Siemens & Halske with a proposal on the design of a cyclotron; the project was appealing to Desiderius Flir and Gustav Hertz at Siemens. Walther Bothe, Director of the Institut für Physik at the Kaiser-Wilhelm Institut für medizinische Forschung (Kaiser Wilhelm Institute for Medical Research; today, the Max-Planck Institut für medizinische Forschung), in Heidelberg, was concurrently a competitor for support and took a different design to Siemens. The construction of their cyclotron at Heidelberg was overseen by Wolfgang Gentner.

== Bibliography ==
- Hentschel, Klaus (editor) and Ann M. Hentschel (editorial assistant and translator) Physics and National Socialism: An Anthology of Primary Sources (Birkhäuser, 1996) ISBN 0-8176-5312-0
- Kant, Horst Werner Heisenberg and the German Uranium Project / Otto Hahn and the Declarations of Mainau and Göttingen, Preprint 203 (Max-Planck Institut für Wissenschaftsgeschichte, 2002)
- Pose, H. Gerhard Hoffmann 60 Jahre, Naturwissenschaften Volume 28, Numbers 31–32, 513-514 (1940). Institutional citation: Berlin-Dahlem.
