= Paul O. Müller =

Austrian physicist (1915–1942)

Paul O. Müller (born 18 April 1915 in Graz; died 9 March 1942 at Pechenkino near Sukhinichi) was an Austrian theoretical nuclear physicist who worked in the German Uranverein. He was drafted into the German armed forces and died on the Russian Front in World War II.

== Education ==
Müller undertook graduate studies at the University of Graz. He received his doctorate in Graz on 25 February 1939, under Erwin Schrödinger.

== Career ==
After 1939, Müller and Karl-Heinz Höcker collaborated with Carl Friedrich von Weizsäcker at the Kaiser-Wilhelm Institut für Physik (KWIP, after World War II reorganized and renamed the Max Planck Institute for Physics), in Berlin-Dahlem, on the theory behind the Uranmaschine (uranium machine, i.e., nuclear reactor).

Many at the KWIP and those working on the Uranmaschine had the classification of unabkömmlich (uk, indispensable) and were exempt from being drafted into armed service. Both Müller and his colleague Höcker had the classification uk, but their fates were quite different. As the war raged on, the demand for men to provide armed service resulted in Höcker and Müller being drafted in late 1940 or early 1941. Not even Kurt Diebner, managing director of the KWIP, could stop the call-up. Höcker was returned to the KWIP in 1942 due to poor health; Müller had died at the Russian front. It was not until 1944 that Werner Osenberg, head of the planning board at the Reichsforschungsrat (RFR, Reich Research Council), was able to initiate calling back 5000 engineers and scientists from the front to work on research categorized as kriegsentscheidend (decisive for the war effort). By the end of the war, the number recalled had reached 15,000. Many of the scientists called for military service were at institutes under the Kaiser-Wilhelm Gesellschaft (Kaiser Wilhelm Society).

== Internal reports ==
The following reports were published in Kernphysikalische Forschungsberichte (Research Reports in Nuclear Physics), an internal publication of the German Uranverein. The reports were classified Top Secret, they had very limited distribution, and the authors were not allowed to keep copies. The reports were confiscated under the Allied Operation Alsos and sent to the United States Atomic Energy Commission for evaluation. In 1971, the reports were declassified and returned to Germany. The reports are available at the Karlsruhe Nuclear Research Center and the American Institute of Physics.

- P. O. Müller Der Wirkungsquerschnitt der Uranspaltung G-7 (December 1939)
- Paul Müller Die Energiegewinnung aus dem Uranspaltungsprozess durch schnelle Neutronen G-49 (1941)
- Paul Müller Eine Bedingung für die Verwendbarkeit von Uran als Sprengstoff G-50 (May 1940)
- Paul Müller Die Neutronenabsorption in Kugelschalen aus Uran G-51 (April 25, 1940)
- Paul Müller Über die Temperaturabhängigkeit der Uranmaschine G-52 (September 30, 1940)
- Paul Müller Berechnung der Energieerzeugung in der Uranmaschine. III Schweres Wasser G-53 (April 29, 1940)
- Carl-Friedrich von Weizsäcker, Paul Müller, and Karl-Heinz Höcker Berechnung der Energieerzeugung in der Uranmaschine G-60 (February 26, 1940)

== Bibliography ==
- Bernstein, Jeremy Hitler’s Uranium Club: The Secret Recording’s at Farm Hall (Copernicus, 2001) ISBN 0-387-95089-3
- Hentschel, Klaus (Editor) and Ann M. Hentschel (Editorial Assistant and Translator) Physics and National Socialism: An Anthology of Primary Sources (Birkhäuser, 1996)
- Macrakis, Kristie Surviving the Swastika: Scientific Research in Nazi Germany (Oxford, 1993) ISBN 0-19-507010-0
- Walker, Mark German National Socialism and the Quest for Nuclear Power 1939–1949 (Cambridge, 1993) ISBN 0-521-43804-7
