= Klara Döpel =

German physicist

Klara (Minna) Renate Döpel (née Mannß; 1900 – 6 April 1945 in Leipzig) was a feminist and a German lawyer until 1933. Then she married the German nuclear physicist Robert Döpel, and they worked together as a team at Leipzig University studying nuclear reactor configurations for the German nuclear energy project. Klara was killed in an air raid near the end of World War II.

== Education ==
Klara Döpel studied law at the Ludwig-Maximilians-Universität München and worked as a lawyer until 1933. In 1934, she married the nuclear physicist Robert Döpel. She changed her area of studies to physics at the Julius Maximilian University Würzburg.

== Career ==
In 1938, Klara Döpel followed her husband Robert to Leipzig, where Robert became an extraordinarius professor at Leipzig University. Robert was a colleague of Werner Heisenberg, who headed the theoretical physics department there. After the German nuclear energy project began, Heisenberg and his staff worked on major components of the program including isotope separation, measurements of nuclear constants, and the Uranmaschine (uranium machine, i.e., nuclear reactor). Klara and Robert worked together on Uranmaschine experimental configurations designated L 1 through L 4. Klara and Robert Döpel and Heisenberg published the Deutsche Forschungsberichte reporting on the experiments conducted there.

In August 1940, Robert and Klara Döpel, working in Leipzig, showed the utility of using heavy water as a moderator in a nuclear reactor. They conducted experiments with a spherical geometry (hollow spheres) of uranium surrounded by heavy water. Trial L-I was done in August 1940, and L-II was conducted six months later. Results from trial L-IV, in the summer of 1942, indicated that the spherical geometry, with five metric tons of heavy water and 10 metric tons of metallic uranium, could sustain a fission reaction. The results were set forth in an article by Robert and Klara Döpel and Werner Heisenberg. The article was published in the Kernphysikalische Forschungsberichte (Research Reports in Nuclear Physics), a classified internal reporting vehicle of the German nuclear energy project. 1942 was the year in which supervision of the project was transferred from the Heereswaffenamt (HWA, Army Ordnance Office) to the Reichsforschungsrat (RFR, Reich Research Council).

In a letter written in December 1943, Robert Döpel recounted that air raids had destroyed 75% of Leipzig, including his institute. Air raids during that year had also burned down Döpel's apartment building and Heisenberg's house in Leipzig. Sixteen months later, on 6 April 1945, just 32 days before the surrender of Germany, Klara was killed in an air raid, while she was working in the physics building.

== Internal reports ==
The following reports were published in Kernphysikalische Forschungsberichte (Research Reports in Nuclear Physics), an internal publication of the German Uranverein. The reports were classified Top Secret, they had very limited distribution, and the authors were not allowed to keep copies. The reports were confiscated under the Allied Operation Alsos and sent to the United States Atomic Energy Commission for evaluation. In 1971, the reports were declassified and returned to Germany. The reports are available at the Karlsruhe Nuclear Research Center and the American Institute of Physics.

- Robert Döpel, K. Döpel, and Werner Heisenberg Bestimmung der Diffusionslänge thermischer Neutronen in Präparat 38 (5 December 1940). G-22.
- Robert Döpel, K. Döpel, and Werner Heisenberg Bestimmung der Diffusionslänge thermischer Neutronen in schwerem Wasser (7 August 1940). G-23.
- Robert Döpel, K. Döpel, and Werner Heisenberg Versuche mit Schichtenanordnungen von D_{2}O und 38 (28 October 1941). G-75.
- Robert Döpel, K. Döpel, and Werner Heisenberg Der experimentelle Nachweis der effektiven Neutronenvermehrung in einem Kugel-Schichten-System aus D_{2}O und Uran-Metall (July 1942). G-136.
- Robert Döpel, K. Döpel, and Werner Heisenberg Die Neutronenvermehrung in einem D_{2}O-38-Metallschichtensystem (March 1942). G-373.
