= Hanle effect =

The Hanle effect (also known as zero-field level crossing) is a reduction in the polarization of light emitted by atoms excited by polarized light, when subjected to a magnetic field. Typically, when atoms are excited by linearly polarized light, the emitted fluorescence is also polarized. If a weak transverse magnetic field is applied, the emitted light becomes depolarized (or its polarization rotates).

This effect can be utilized in experiments to measure the lifetime of excited states and detect the presence of magnetic fields.

Unlike Faraday effect which causes polarisation rotation proportional to the length of travel within the magnetic field, instead for Hanle effect, the rotation attenuation reaches its maximum as soon as the sample experiences the longitudinal magnetic field and there is no dependence upon the length of path traveled in the magnetic field.

== History ==
The first experimental evidence for the effect came from Robert W. Wood, and Lord Rayleigh. The effect is named after Wilhelm Hanle, who was the first to explain the effect, in terms of classical physics, in Zeitschrift für Physik in 1924. Initially, the causes of the effect were controversial, and many theorists mistakenly thought it was a version of the Faraday effect. Attempts to understand the phenomenon were important in the subsequent development of quantum physics.

An early theoretical treatment of level crossing effect was given by Gregory Breit.

== Theory ==
Typical experimental setup for observing the Hanle effect

=== Classical model ===
The classical explanation for this effect involves the Lorentz oscillator model, which treats the electron bound to the nucleus as a classical oscillator. When light interacts with this oscillator, it sets the electron in motion in the direction of its polarization. Consequently, the radiation emitted by this moving electron is polarized in the same direction as the incident light, as explained by classical electrodynamics.

Consider light propagating along the y-axis, linearly polarized with the electric field along the x-axis, incident on a single atom in a vapor cell. The vapor cell is placed in a uniform magnetic field along the z-axis. A detector is placed to monitor the fluorescent light emitted along the z-axis from the vapor cell and measure its polarization in the x-y plane.

The oscillating electric field of the incident light induces oscillations in the electron along the x axis. The electric field generated by the induced dipole along the z-axis is given by

$\mathbf E(z, t) = \frac{\omega_0^2}{4\pi\epsilon_0 c^2} \mathbf{p}'(t - z/c)\frac{\cos[kz - \omega_0(t - t_0)]}{z}$

where $\omega_0$ is the angular frequency of the incident light and $t_0$ is the time at which the electron is excited.

The component of the fluorescent light polarized at angle $\alpha$ with respect to the x axis at the detector has intensity given by

$I(\alpha, t) = \frac{\omega_0^4 p_0^2}{64\pi^2\epsilon c^3} e^{-(t-t_0)/\tau \{1 + cos[2(\omega_L(t - t_0) - 2\alpha]\}}$

where $\omega_L = g_J eB/(2m_0)$ is the Larmor frequency and $1/\tau$ is the damping rate of the fluorescence radiation.

Consider $N$ atoms in the vapor cell, excited at a constant rate $R$. The steady-state intensity at the detector can be obtained by integrating over the excitation time $t_0$ from $-\infty$ to $t$, which gives

$I(\alpha) = NR \frac{p_0^2 \omega_0^4}{128 \pi^2 \epsilon_0 c^3} \left[\frac{1}{\gamma} + \frac{\gamma \cos(2\alpha)}{\gamma^2 + \omega_L^2} + \frac{\sin(2\alpha)}{\gamma^2 + \omega_L^2}\right]$

The polarization degree is

$P = \frac{I_x - I_y}{I_x + I_y} = \frac{1}{1 + (g_Je\tau/m_0c)^2 B^2}$

where $I_x$ and $I_y$ are the intensities of the x-polarized component ($\alpha = 0$) and the y-polarized component ($\alpha = \pi/2$). This has a Lorentzian shape as a function of the magnetic field strength $B$.

=== Quantum mechanical model ===
Polarized light excites atoms into a coherent superposition of Zeeman sublevels in the excited state. External magnetic field causes this coherent superposition state to precess around the field direction at the Larmor frequency:

$\omega_L = \frac{eB}{2m_e} = g_J \mu_B B / \hbar$

As the atom precesses before emitting, the polarization of the emitted photon is rotated or washed out. If the precession period is comparable to or shorter than the excited state lifetime, significant depolarization occurs.

== Applications ==
Observation of the Hanle effect on the light emitted by the Sun is used to indirectly measure the magnetic fields within the Sun, see:

- Polarization in astronomy
- Imaging spectroscopy

The effect was initially considered in the context of gasses, followed by applications to solid state physics. It has been used to measure both the states of localized electrons and free electrons. For spin-polarized electrical currents, the Hanle effect provides a way to measure the effective spin lifetime in a particular device.

== Related effects ==
The zero-field Hanle level crossings involve magnetic fields, in which the states which are degenerate at zero magnetic field are split due to the Zeeman effect. There is also the closely analogous zero-field Stark level crossings with electric fields, in which the states which are degenerate at zero electric field are split due to the Stark effect. Tests of zero field Stark level crossings came after the Hanle-type measurements, and are generally less common, due to the increased complexity of the experiments.

== See also ==
- Larmor precession
- Resonance fluorescence
- Optical pumping
