= Leipzig L-IV experiment accident =

Nuclear accident in Leipzig, Germany

The Leipzig L-IV experiment accident was the first nuclear accident in history. It occurred on 23 June 1942 in a laboratory at the Physical Institute of the Leipzig University in Leipzig, Germany. There was a steam explosion and a reactor fire in the "uranium machine", a primitive form of research reactor.

Shortly after the Leipzig L-IV atomic pile—worked on by Werner Heisenberg and Robert Döpel—demonstrated Germany's first signs of neutron propagation, the device was checked for a possible heavy water leak. During the inspection, air leaked in, igniting the uranium powder inside. The burning uranium boiled the water jacket, generating enough steam pressure to blow the reactor apart. Burning uranium powder scattered throughout the lab causing a larger fire at the facility.

This happened after 20 days of operation when Werner Paschen opened the machine at the request of Döpel after blisters formed at the gasket. As glowing uranium powder shot to the 6-meter-high ceiling and the apparatus heated up to 1000 degrees, Heisenberg was asked for help but could not provide it.

== The experiment ==
Results from the L-IV trial, in the first half of 1942, indicated that the spherical geometry, with five tonnes of heavy water and 10 tonnes of metallic uranium, could sustain a fission reaction. They had achieved the first net neutron production of the German program, three years after the first such pile in history by Hans von Halban and colleagues in Paris. The results were set forth in an article by Robert Döpel, Klara Döpel and W. Heisenberg. The article was published at first in the Kernphysikalische Forschungsberichte (Research Reports in Nuclear Physics), a classified internal reporting vehicle of the Uranverein.

The Leipzig research group was led by Heisenberg until 1942 who in winter 1939/1940 reported on the possibilities and feasibility of energy extraction from uranium for a uranium reactor and nuclear bomb. After the report Heisenberg withdrew from practical experiments and left the execution of the experiments L-I, L-II, L-III and L-IV mostly up to his coworkers. The accident ended the Leipzig uranium projects.

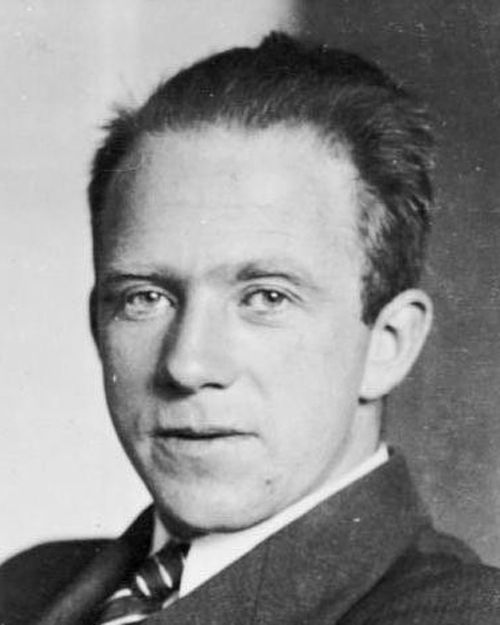
Werner Heisenberg (1933)

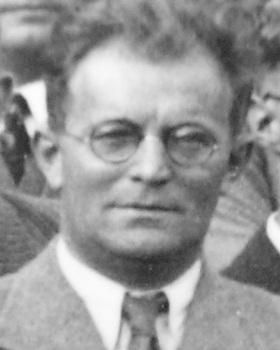
Robert Döpel (1935)
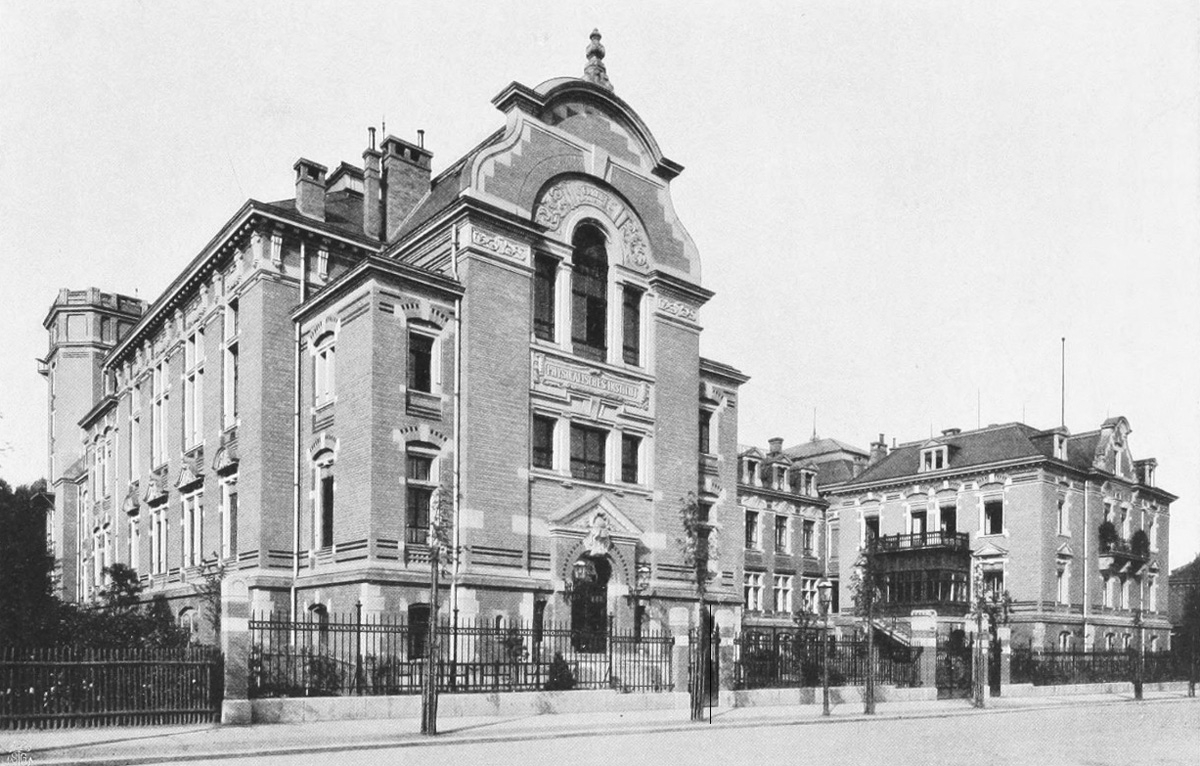
Physical Institute Leipzig (1909)

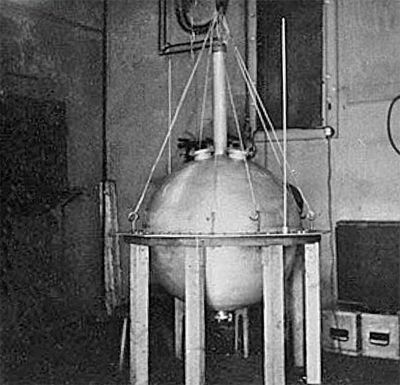
Leipzig uranium machine (1942)

== See also ==
- German nuclear weapons program
- Nuclear safety and security
- Nuclear power in Germany
- Lists of nuclear disasters and radioactive incidents
