= Karl-Heinz Höcker =

German physicist (1915–1998)

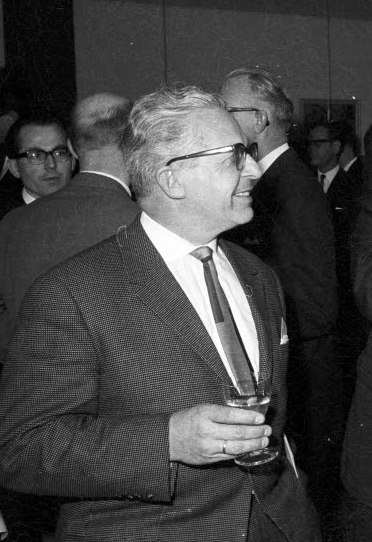
Karl-Heinz Höcker in 1966

Karl-Heinz Höcker (27 December 1915 – 17 July 1998) was a German theoretical nuclear physicist who worked in the German Uranverein. After World War II, he worked at the university of Stuttgart and was the founder of the Institut für Kernenergetik und Energiesysteme.

== Early life and education ==
Höcker was born in Bremen. From 1935 to 1940, he studied at the University of Marburg and the Friedrich-Wilhelms University (in 1949 reorganized and renamed the Humboldt University of Berlin). He received his doctorate at the Friedrich-Wilhelms University, in 1940, under Carl Friedrich von Weizsäcker.

== Career ==
After 1939, Höcker and Paul O. Müller collaborated with von Weizsäcker at the Kaiser-Wilhelm Institut für Physik (KWIP, after World War II reorganized and renamed the Max Planck Institute for Physics), in Berlin-Dahlem, on the theory behind the Uranmaschine (uranium machine, i.e., nuclear reactor). In 1942, Höcker was an Assistant (Assistant) at the KWIP.

Many at the KWIP and those working on the Uranmaschine had the classification of unabkömmlich (uk, indispensable) and were exempt from being drafted into armed service. Both Höcker and his colleague Müller had the classification uk, but their fates were quite different. As the war raged on, the demand for men to provide armed service resulted in Höcker and Müller being drafted in late 1940 or early 1941. Not even Kurt Diebner, managing director of the KWIP, could stop the call-up. Höcker was returned to the KWIP in 1942 due to poor health; Müller died at the Russian front. It was not until 1944 that Werner Osenberg, head of the planning board at the Reichsforschungsrat (RFR, Reich Research Council), was able to initiate calling back 5000 engineers and scientists from the front to work on research categorized as kriegsentscheidend (decisive for the war effort). By the end of the war, the number recalled had reached 15,000. Many of the scientists called for military service had been at institutes under the Kaiser-Wilhelm Gesellschaft (Kaiser Wilhelm Society).

Shortly after return to the KWIP, Höcker became an Assistant to von Weizsäcker and they went to the German-occupied University of Strasbourg, Alsace, France. Höcker performed a theoretical analysis on the geometry for uranium reactors, concluding with the choice of the lattice arrangement.

In 1943, most of the KWIP was evacuated to Hechingen in Southern Germany as a result of air raids on Berlin. In 1944, Höcker and von Weizsäcker evacuated Strasbourg and went to the KWIP facilities there.

In 1948, Höcker was a supernumerary lecturer and in 1955 a supernumerary professor of theoretical physics and nucleonics at the University of Stuttgart.

The beginning of the Institut für Kernenergetik und Energiesysteme (Institute for Nuclear Power and Energy Systems) was in 1955 when Höcker, at the University of Stuttgart, founded the Arbeitsgruppe zur Kerntechnik (Working Group on Nuclear Technology) and became its director. In 1963, Höcker occupied the newly created Lehrstuhl der Fakultät Maschinenwesen (Chair of the Faculty of Mechanical Engineering) and was simultaneously appointed as Director of the Institut für Kernenergetik (Institute for Nuclear Power). In accordance with its expanded responsibilities, the institute is now known as the Institut für Kernenergetik und Energiesysteme (IKE). Höcker's 80th birthday, his role as founder and leader in the IKE, and the 40th anniversary of the IKE were celebrated by a Festkolloquium in 1996.

== Internal reports ==
The following reports were published in Kernphysikalische Forschungsberichte (Research Reports in Nuclear Physics), an internal publication of the German Uranverein. The reports were classified Top Secret, they had very limited distribution, and the authors were not allowed to keep copies. The reports were confiscated under the Allied Operation Alsos and sent to the United States Atomic Energy Commission for evaluation. In 1971, the reports were declassified and returned to Germany. The reports are available at the Karlsruhe Nuclear Research Center and the American Institute of Physics.

- Karl-Heinz Höcker Die Abhängigkeit des Energiegewinnes in der Uranmaschine von der Dichte des Urans und der Dichte der Bremssubstanz G-41 (16 June 1940)
- Karl-Heinz Höcker Berechnung der Energieerzeugung in der Uranmaschine. II Kohle als Bremssubstanz G-42 (20 April 1940)
- Karl-Heinz Höcker Berechnung der Energieerzeugung in der Uranmaschine. IV Wasser G-43 (3 June 1940)
- Carl-Friedrich von Weizsäcker, Paul Müller, and Karl-Heinz Höcker Berechnung der Energieerzeugung in der Uranmaschine G-60 (26 February 1940)
- F. Berkei, W. Borrmann, W. Czulius, Kurt Diebner, Georg Hartwig, K. H. Höcker, W. Herrmann, H. Pose, and Ernst Rexer Bericht über einen Würfelversuch mit Uranoxyd und Paraffin (dated before 26 November 1942). G-125.
- Karl-Heinz Höcker Auswertung des Würfelversuchs mit Uranoxyd und Paraffin in der Versuchsstelle Gottow des Heereswaffenamts G-164 (26 November 1942)
- Kurt Diebner, Georg Hartwig, W. Herrmann, H. Westmeyer, Werner Czulius, F. Berkei, and Karl-Heinz Höcker Vorläufige Mitteilung über einen Versuch mit Uranwürfeln und schwerem Eis als Bremssubstanz G-211 (April 1943)
- Kurt Diebner, Georg Hartwig, W. Herrmann, H. Westmeyer, Werner Czulius, F. Berkei, and Karl-Heinz Höcker Bericht übereinen Versuch mit Würfeln aus Uran-Metall und schwerem Eis G-212 (July 1943)
- Karl-Heinz Höcker Über die Anordnung von Ruan und Streusubstanz in der U-Machine G-218 (25 January 1943)
- Karl-Heinz Höcker Zure Auswertung der Grossversuche G-221
- Karl-Heinz Höcker Über die Abmessungen von Uran und schwerem Wasser in einer Kugelstrukturmaschine G-222 (23 June 1943)
- Karl-Heinz Höcker Vergleich der bei L-VI bestimmten Neutronendichte mit der Theorie G-223 (November 1943)

== Books ==
- Wilhelm Bierfelder and Karl-Heinz Höcker (editors) Systemforschung und Neuerungsmanagement. Fachberichte und Referate. Band 11 (Oldenbourg, 1980) ISBN 3-486-24981-9

== Selected literature ==
- K.-H. Höcker Die Komponenten der kosmischen Strahlung und ihre Intensitäten in der Atmosphäre, Annalen der Physik Volume 441, Issue 1, 353–364 (1950)
- E. Schopper, K. H. Höcker, G. Kuhn Secondary Nucleons in Lead, Physical Review Volume 82, Issue 3, 445–445 (1951). Institutional citation: Technische Hochschule, Stuttgart, Germany.

== Bibliography ==
- Bernstein, Jeremy Hitler’s Uranium Club: The Secret Recording’s at Farm Hall (Copernicus, 2001) ISBN 0-387-95089-3
- Hentschel, Klaus (Editor) and Ann M. Hentschel (Editorial Assistant and Translator) Physics and National Socialism: An Anthology of Primary Sources (Birkhäuser, 1996)
- Macrakis, Kristie Surviving the Swastika: Scientific Research in Nazi Germany (Oxford, 1993) ISBN 0-19-507010-0
- Walker, Mark German National Socialism and the Quest for Nuclear Power 1939–1949 (Cambridge, 1993) ISBN 0-521-43804-7

== Notes ==
- Biography of Karl-Heinz Höcker (in German)
