= Wolfgang Gentner =

German nuclear physicist (1906–1980)

Wolfgang Gentner (23 July 1906 in Frankfurt am Main – 4 September 1980 in Heidelberg) was a German experimental nuclear physicist.

Gentner received his doctorate in 1930 from the University of Frankfurt. From 1932 to 1935 he had a fellowship which allowed him to do postdoctoral research and study at Curie's Radium Institute at the University of Paris. From 1936 to 1945, he was a staff scientist at the Institute of Physics at the Kaiser Wilhelm Institute for Medical Research, in Heidelberg. One of his areas of specialization was nuclear photoeffects. He was granted his Habilitation from the University of Frankfurt in 1937. At the end of 1938 and early 1939, he visited the Radiation Laboratory at the University of California, Berkeley; upon his return to Germany, he participated in the construction of a cyclotron at Heidelberg. During World War II, he participated in the German nuclear energy project, also called the Uranium Club. After World War II, Gentner became a professor at the University of Freiberg.

In 1956, Gentner was appointed director of the Synchrocyclotron Department at CERN. In 1958, he became director of the new Max Planck Institute for Nuclear Physics at Heidelberg. From 1967 to 1970, he was chairman of the Physicochemical-technical Section of the Max Planck Society. From 1969 to 1971, he was president of the Science Policy Committee and president of the council at CERN. From 1972, he was vice-president of the Max Planck Society. From 1975, he was a member of the board of governors at the Weizmann Institute of Science, Israel.

Gentner helped found a number of European scientific organizations during the 1960s. The prestigious Wolfgang Gentner Fellowship for PhD students at CERN is named after Gentner.

== Education ==
From 1925 to 1930, Gentner studied at the Friedrich-Alexander-Universität Erlangen-Nürnberg and the Johann Wolfgang Goethe-Universität Frankfurt am Main. While in his first semester at Erlangen, his father died, so he returned to Frankfurt to help care for his mother and continued his education at Frankfurt. He received his doctorate in 1930 under Friedrich Dessauer, who was director of the Institut für die physikalischen Grundlagen der Medizin (Institute for the Physical Fundamentals of Medicine), at the University of Frankfurt. His thesis was on the range of electrons in matter and their biological effects. In 1932, he was an auxiliary aid (Hilfsassistent) to Dessauer. From 1933 to 1935, he was a fellow of the Oswalt-Stiftung (Oswalt Foundation) of the University of Frankfurt and a fellow of the Carnegie Foundation, whose assistance he used to study at the Radium Institute of the University of Paris, which at that time was under the leadership of Marie Curie.

== Career ==
From 1936 to 1945, Gentner was a staff assistant at Walther Bothe's Institut für Physik at the Kaiser-Wilhelm Institut für medizinische Forschung (KWImF, Kaiser Wilhelm Institute for Medical Research; today, the Max-Planck Institut für medizinische Forschung), in Heidelberg. One of his areas of specialization was in nuclear photoeffects (Kernphotoeffekt).

In 1932, Walther Bothe had succeeded Philipp Lenard as director of the Physikalische und Radiologische Institut (Physics and Radiological Institute) at the University of Heidelberg. When Adolf Hitler became Chancellor of Germany on 30 January 1933, the concept of Deutsche Physik took on more favor as well as fervor; deutsche Physik, was anti-Semitic and anti-theoretical physics, especially modern physics, including quantum mechanics and both atomic and nuclear physics. As applied in the university environment, political factors took priority over the historically applied concept of scholarly ability, even though its two most prominent supporters were the Nobel Laureates in Physics Philipp Lenard and Johannes Stark. Supporters of deutsche Physik launched vicious attacks against leading theoretical physicists. While Lenard was retired from the University of Heidelberg, he still had significant influence there. In 1934, Lenard had managed to get Bothe relieved of his directorship of the Institute of Physics at the University of Heidelberg, whereupon Bothe was able to become the director of the Institut für Physik of the KWImF, replacing Karl W. Hauser, who had recently died. Ludolf von Krehl, director of the KWImF, and Max Planck, President of the Kaiser-Wilhelm Gesellschaft (KWG, Kaiser Wilhelm Society, today, the Max-Planck Gesellschaft), had offered the directorship to Bothe to ward off the possibility of his emigration. When it came time for Gentner to submit his Habilitationsschrift, Die Absorption, Streuung und Sekundärstrahlung harter Gamma-Strahlen (The absorption, scattering and secondary hard gamma rays), the relations between the KWImF and the University of Heidelberg were so strained that Habilitation was not possible there. So, Gentner completed the requirements at the University of Frankfurt, in 1937, and became a Privatdozent (lecturer) there. This necessitated making trips by train between the facilities, which soon became a burden.

By the end of 1937, the rapid successes Bothe and Gentner had with the building and research uses of a Van de Graaff generator had led them to consider building a cyclotron. By November, a report had already been sent to the president of the Kaiser-Wilhelm Gesellschaft (KWG, Kaiser Wilhelm Society; today, the Max Planck Society), and Bothe began securing funds from the Helmholtz-Gesellschaft (Helmholtz Society; today, the Helmholtz Association of German Research Centres), the Badischen Kultusministerium (Baden Ministry of Culture), I.G. Farben, the KWG, and various other research oriented agencies. Initial promises led to ordering a magnet from Siemens in September 1938, however, further financing then became problematic. In these times, Gentner continued his research on the nuclear photoeffect, with the aid of the Van de Graaff generator, which had been upgraded to produce energies just under 1 MeV. When his line of research was completed with the ^{7}Li (p, gamma) and the ^{11}B (p, gamma) reactions, and on the nuclear isomer ^{80}Br, Gentner devoted his full effort to the building of the planned cyclotron.

In order to facilitate the construction of the cyclotron, at the end of 1938 and into 1939, with the help of a fellowship from the Helmholtz-Gesellschaft, Gentner was sent to Radiation Laboratory of the University of California (today, the Lawrence Berkeley National Laboratory) in Berkeley, California. As a result of the visit, Gentner formed a cooperative relationship with Emilio G. Segrè and Donald Cooksey.

The German nuclear energy project, also known as the Uranverein, began in the spring of 1939 under the auspices of the Reichsforschungsrat (RFR, Reich Research Council) of the Reichserziehungsministerium (REM, Reich Ministry of Education). By 1 September, the Heereswaffenamt (HWA, Army Ordnance Office) squeezed out the RFR and took over the effort. Under the control of the HWA, the Uranverein had its first meeting on 16 September. The meeting was organized by Kurt Diebner, advisor to the HWA, and held in Berlin. The invitees included Walther Bothe, Siegfried Flügge, Hans Geiger, Otto Hahn, Paul Harteck, Gerhard Hoffmann, Josef Mattauch, and Georg Stetter. A second meeting was held soon thereafter and included Klaus Clusius, Robert Döpel, Werner Heisenberg, and Carl Friedrich von Weizsäcker. With Bothe being one of the principals, Gentner was soon drawn into work for the Uranverein, along with other colleagues, such as Arnold Flammersfeld and Peter Herbert Jensen. Their research was published in the Kernphysikalische Forschungsberichte (Research Reports in Nuclear Physics); see below the section Internal Reports.

After the armistice between France and Germany in the summer of 1940, Bothe and Gentner received orders to inspect the cyclotron Frédéric Joliot-Curie had built in Paris. While it had been built, it was not yet operational. In September 1940, Gentner received orders to form a group to put the cyclotron into operation. Hermann Dänzer from the University of Frankfurt participated in this effort.

According to author Robert Jungk in his landmark work, Brighter Than A Thousand Suns, Gentner only agreed to take over Joliot-Curie's laboratory after he had received Joliot-Curie's express consent - and the two men crafted a secret agreement that the laboratory would not complete work that supported the German war effort.

While in Paris, Gentner intervened personally to free both Frédéric Joliot-Curie and Paul Langevin after they were arrested and detained. At the end of the winter of 1941/1942, the cyclotron was operational with a 7-MeV beam of deuterons. Uranium and thorium were irradiated with the beam, and the byproducts were sent to Otto Hahn at the Kaiser-Wilhelm Institut für Chemie (KWIC, Kaiser Wilhelm Institute for Chemistry, today, the Max Planck Institute for Chemistry), in Berlin. In mid-1942, according to Jungk, Gentner was relieved of his duties because of the "weakness" he had shown. His successor in Paris was Wolfgang Riezler from Bonn.

A next mission of the HWA was the completion of the Heidelberg cyclotron. It was during 1941 that Bothe had acquired all the necessary funding to complete construction. The magnet was delivered in March 1943, and the first beam of deuteron was emitted in December. The inauguration ceremony for the cyclotron was held on 2 June 1944.

In 1941, Gentner was authorized as a Dozent (lecturer) with a Lehrauftrag (teaching assignment) at the University of Heidelberg.

In 1946, Gentner became an ordentlicher Professor (ordinarius professor) at the Albert-Ludwigs-Universität Freiburg, where he worked on nuclear and cosmic-ray physics. From 1947 to 1949, he was also Prorektor (vice-rector) of the university.

During 1956 and 1957, Gentner was a member of the Arbeitskreis Kernphysik (Nuclear Physics Working Group) of the Fachkommission II "Forschung und Nachwuchs" (Commission II "Research and Growth") of the Deutschen Atomkommission (DAtK, German Atomic Energy Commission). Other members of the Nuclear Physics Working Group in both 1956 and 1957 were: Werner Heisenberg (chairman), Hans Kopfermann (vice-chairman), Fritz Bopp, Walther Bothe, Otto Haxel, Willibald Jentschke, Heinz Maier-Leibnitz, Josef Mattauch, Wolfgang Riezler, Wilhelm Walcher, and Carl Friedrich von Weizsäcker. Wolfgang Paul was also a member of the group during 1957.

In 1956, soon after the founding of CERN, in Geneva, Gentner was appointed Direktor der Abteilung Synchrozyklotron (Director of the Synchrocyclotron Department) and Direktor der Forschung (Director of Research), positions which he held until October 1958. His department was responsible for the construction of their 600-MeV synchrocyclotron. Parallel to this, he had also been asked by the Stuttgarter Landesregierung (Stuttgart State Government) to be the first head of the Kernforschungszentrum Karlsruhe (KfK, Karlsruhe Nuclear Research Centre, today the Forschungszentrum Karlsruhe), whose construction had just been decided. Gentner declined so as to stay with more fundamental research, rather than applied. The synchrocyclotron at CERN delivered its first beam on 1 August 1957. From 1971 to 1974, he was chairman of the CERN board.

At the end of 1957, Gentner was in negotiations with Otto Hahn, President of the Max-Planck Gesellschaft (MPG, Max Planck Society, successor of the Kaiser-Wilhelm Gesellschaft), and with the Senate of the MPG to establish a new institute under their auspices. Essentially, Walther Bothe's Institut für Physik at the Max-Planck Institut für medizinische Forschung, in Heidelberg, was to be spun off and become a full-fledged institute of the MPG. The decision to proceed was made in May 1958. Gentner was named the director of the Max-Planck Institut für Kernphysik (MPIK, Max Planck Institute for Nuclear Physics) on 1 October, and he also received the position as an ordentlicher Professor (ordinarius professor) at the University of Heidelberg. Bothe had not lived to see the final establishment of the MPIK, as he had died in February of that year.

In 1959, in collaboration with his Heidelberg colleagues Otto Haxel and J. Hans D. Jensen, Gentner closed negotiations with the Heidelberger Gemeinderates (Heidelberg Local Council) to build a 6-Mev tandem-accelerator and a special building for the study of cosmic physics.

From 1967 to 1970, Gentner was Vorsitzender (chairman) of the physikalisch-chemisch-technischen Sektion (Physicochemical-technical Section) of the Max-Planck Gesellschaft. During this period, the Max-Planck-Institut für Astronomie (Max Planck Institute for Astronomy) was founded in Heidelberg. At the end of his term as section chairman, Gentner had two medical operations, one for cataracts, which were attributed to neutron radiation exposure from his early years of experimental nuclear research.

At CERN, from 1969 to 1971, Gentner was Vorsitzender des Wissenschaftsausschusses (President of the Science Policy Committee) and from 1972 to 1974 Präsident des Rates (President of the council).

From 1972, Gentner was vice-president of the Max-Planck Gesellschaft. This was a particularly critical period for the MPG for purposes of consolidation, after 10 years of expansion.

From 1975, Gentner was a member of the board of governors at the Weizmann Institute of Science, in Israel.

In the second half of the 1960s, Gentner helped scientific colleagues with establishing scientific institutions. With his knowledge of French science, Gentner helped Heinz Maier-Liebnitz with the establishment of the Institut Laue-Langevin in Grenoble. Gentner also helped Christoph Schmelzer establish the Gesellschaft für Schwerionenforschungs (GSI, Society for Heavy Ion Research), in Darmstadt. In 1968, in Florence, Gentner and Gilberto Bernardini founded of the European Physical Society.

During his career, Gentner demonstrated his interest in Kosmochemie und Archäometrie (cosmochemistry and archaeometry), which are fields at the intersection of cultural and natural sciences.

== Honors ==
Gentner was a member of many scientific academies and was awarded a number of honors:

- Cothenius-Medaille in Gold [1977] – German Academy of Sciences Leopoldina
- Ernst Hellmut-Vits-Preises [1974]
- Großes Verdienstkreuz mit Stern der Bundesrepublik Deutschland (Knight Commander's Cross of the Order of Merit of the Federal Republic of Germany) [1974]
- Officier de la Légion d'honneur [1965] (Officer of the Legion of Honor, France)
- Orden Pour le mérite für Wissenschaft und Künste [1974]
- Otto Hahn Prize of the City of Frankfurt am Main [1979]
- Wolfgang Gentner Chair established at the Weizmann Institute of Science, in Israel. [posthum]

== Personal ==
Gentner married Alice Pfaehler. They had a son Ralph and a daughter Doris.

== Internal reports ==
The following reports were published in Kernphysikalische Forschungsberichte (Research Reports in Nuclear Physics), an internal publication of the German Uranverein. The reports were classified Top Secret, they had very limited distribution, and the authors were not allowed to keep copies. The reports were confiscated under the Allied Operation Alsos and sent to the United States Atomic Energy Commission for evaluation. In 1971, the reports were declassified and returned to Germany. The reports are available at the Karlsruhe Nuclear Research Center and the American Institute of Physics.

- Walther Bothe and Wolfgang Gentner Die Energie der Spaltungsneutronen aus Uran G-17 (9 May 1940)
- Arnold Flammersfeld, Peter Jensen, Wolfgang Gentner Die Energietönung der Uranspaltung G-25 (21 May 1940)
- Arnold Flammersfeld, Peter Jensen, Wolfgang Gentner Die Aufteilungsverhältnisse und Energietönung bei der Uranspaltung G-26 (24 September 1940)

== Selected bibliography ==
- Bothe, W.; Gentner, W. (1937). "Herstellung neuer Isotope durch Kernphotoeffekt". Die Naturwissenschaften (in German). 25 (8). Springer Science and Business Media LLC: 126. Bibcode:1937NW.....25..126B. doi:10.1007/bf01492066. ISSN 0028-1042. S2CID 36770067.
- Gentner, W. (1938). "Kernphotoeffekt unter gleichzeitiger Aussendung von zwei Neutronen". Die Naturwissenschaften (in German). 26 (7). Springer Science and Business Media LLC: 109. Bibcode:1938NW.....26..109G. doi:10.1007/bf01773078. ISSN 0028-1042. S2CID 41214225.
- Gentner, W. (1937). "Mitteilungen aus der Kernphysik". Die Naturwissenschaften (in German). 25 (29). Springer Science and Business Media LLC: 479–480. Bibcode:1937NW.....25..479G. doi:10.1007/bf01492002. ISSN 0028-1042. S2CID 30801328.

== Sources ==
- Beyerchen, Alan (1977). Scientists under Hitler : politics and the physics community in the Third Reich. New Haven: Yale University Press. ISBN 0-300-01830-4. OCLC 2818271.
- Citron, A In Memoriam Wolfgang Gentner, Physikalische Blätter Volume 36, 358–359 (1980)
- Hoffmann, Dieter (2006). Wolfgang Gentner : Festschrift zum 100. Geburtstag (in German). Berlin, Heidelberg: Springer-Verlag. ISBN 978-3-540-33701-0. OCLC 315758868.
- Hentschel, Klaus (1996). Physics and national socialism : an anthology of primary sources. Basel Boston: Birkhäuser Verlag. ISBN 0-8176-5312-0. OCLC 34192524.
- Walker, Mark (1993). German national socialism and the quest for nuclear power, 1939-1949. Cambridge England New York: Cambridge University Press. ISBN 0-521-43804-7. OCLC 29632492.
- Weiner, Charles Oral history interview with Wolfgang Gentner AIP Niels Bohr Library, 15 November 1971 (AIP Niels Bohr Library, Wolfgang Gentner)
