= Kurt Diebner =

German nuclear physicist (1905–1964)

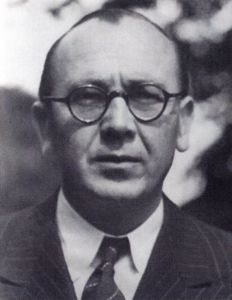
- Born: 13 May 1905; Obernessa, Weißenfels, German Empire
- Died: 13 June 1964 (aged 59); Oberhausen, West Germany
- Citizenship: Germany
- Education: University of Halle-Wittenberg; University of Innsbruck
- Known for: German nuclear program
- Scientific career
- Fields: Nuclear Physics
- Workplaces: Physikalisch-Technische Bundesanstalt; Reichswehrministerium; Reichskriegsministerium; Army Ordnance Office; University of Göttingen; Max-Planck Gesellschaft
- Doctoral advisor: Gerhard Hoffmann

Kurt Diebner (13 May 1905 – 13 July 1964) was a German nuclear physicist who is well known for directing and administering parts of the German nuclear weapons program, a secretive program aiming to build nuclear weapons for Nazi Germany during World War II. He was appointed the project's administrative director after Adolf Hitler authorized it.

Diebner was also the director of the Nuclear Research Council and a Reich Planning Officer for the German Army until its surrender to Allied Powers in 1945. After the war, he was incarcerated in the United Kingdom and repatriated back to West Germany in early 1946. Shortly after his return, he became director and joint owner of DURAG-Apparatebau GmbH, and was a member of the supervisory board of the Gesellschaft zur Kernenergieverwertung in Schiffbau und Schiffahrt m.b.H

== Education ==
Diebner was born in 1905 in Obernessa, Weißenfels in German Empire. From 1925, Diebner went on to study Physics at the Martin Luther University of Halle-Wittenberg where he gained B.S. in 1928, and M.S. in Physics from Leopold Franzens University of Innsbruck in 1930. He completed his doctorate in 1932 under Gerhard Hoffmann in Halle. His thesis was on column ionization of alpha particles.

== Academic career ==
From 1931 to 1934, Diebner was Gerhard Hoffmann's teaching assistant at Halle University.

From 1934, Diebner was a part-time employee of the Physikalisch-Technische Reichsanstalt (PTR, Reich Physical and Technical Institute; today, the Physikalisch-Technische Bundesanstalt); he was also an advisor to the Reichswehrministerium (RWM, Reich Ministry of Defense; after 1939, the Reichskriegsministerium, RWK, Reich Ministry of War) and the Heereswaffenamt (HWA, Army Ordnance Office) on nuclear physics.

== German nuclear program ==
On 22 April 1939, after hearing a paper by Wilhelm Hanle on the use of uranium fission in a Uranmaschine (uranium machine, i.e., nuclear reactor), Georg Joos, along with Hanle, notified Wilhelm Dames, at the Reichserziehungsministerium (REM, Reich Ministry of Education), of potential military applications of nuclear energy. Just seven days later, a group, organized by Dames, met at the REM to discuss the potential of a sustained nuclear chain reaction. The group included the physicists Walther Bothe, Robert Döpel, Hans Geiger, Wolfgang Gentner, Wilhelm Hanle, Gerhard Hoffmann, and Joos. After this, informal work began at the Georg-August University of Göttingen, and the group of physicists was known informally as the first Uranverein (Uranium Club) and formally as Arbeitsgemeinschaft für Kernphysik (Working Group for Nuclear Physics). The second Uranverein began after the Heereswaffenamt (HWA, Army Ordnance Office) squeezed out the Reichsforschungsrat (RFR, Reich Research Council) of the REM and started the formal German nuclear energy project. The second Uranverein had its first meeting on 16 September 1939, which was organized by Kurt Diebner; formally, Diebner was director of the Kernforschungsrat (Nuclear Research Council), under General Carl Heinrich Becker of the HWA. It was then that Kaiser-Wilhelm Institut für Physik (KWIP, after World War II reorganized and renamed the Max Planck Institute for Physics), in Berlin-Dahlem, was placed under HWA authority, with Diebner as the administrative director, and the military control of the nuclear research commenced. Some of the research was carried out at the Versuchsstelle (testing station) of the HWA in Gottow; Diebner, was director of this facility as well as the experimental station of the RFR in Stadtilm. When it was apparent that the nuclear energy project would not make a decisive contribution to ending the war effort in the near term, control of the KWIP was returned to its umbrella organization, the Kaiser-Wilhelm Gesellschaft (KWG/Kaiser Wilhelm Society), after World War II renamed the Max-Planck Gesellschaft) in January 1942 and control of the project was relinquished to the RFR that year. However, the HWA did maintain its testing station in Gottow and continue research there under Diebner's direction until the end of the war. During Diebner's directorship at the KWIP, considerable personal animosity had developed between Diebner and Werner Heisenberg and his scientific circle, which included Carl Friedrich von Weizsäcker and Karl Wirtz; when Diebner left the KWIP, Heisenberg became the acting director.

It was at the Gottow facility that nuclear fission experiments designated G-I and G-III were conducted. The G-1 experiment had lattices of 6,800 uranium oxide cubes (about 25 tons) in the nuclear moderator paraffin. The work verified Karl Heinz Höcker's calculations that cubes were better than rods, and rods were better than plates. The G-III experiment was a small-scale design, but it generated an exceptionally high rate of neutron production. The G-III model was superior to nuclear fission chain reaction experiments that had been conducted at the KWIP in Berlin-Dahem, the University of Heidelberg, or the University of Leipzig. Work was also done to explore the initiation of a nuclear reaction through the detonation of explosives.

In the latter part of World War II, in addition to his other responsibilities, Diebner was a Reich Planning Officer.

== Program collapsed ==
Diebner was rounded up on 2 May 1945 as part of the Allied Operation Alsos, taken to Godmanchester, England and interned at Farm Hall, with nine other scientists thought to be involved in nuclear research and development. The nine others incarcerated were Erich Bagge, Walther Gerlach, Otto Hahn, Paul Harteck, Werner Heisenberg, Horst Korsching, Max von Laue, Carl Friedrich von Weizsäcker, and Karl Wirtz. All were involved with nuclear research except for von Laue. They were repatriated to Germany in early 1946.

From 1947/1948, Diebner was director and joint owner of DURAG-Apparatebau GmbH in Hamburg.

== Postwar career ==
From 1956, Diebner was a member of the supervisory board of the Gesellschaft zur Kernenergieverwertung in Schiffbau und Schiffahrt m.b.H (GKSS, Company for the Commercial Exploitation of Nuclear energy in Ship Building and Shipping); Erich Bagge, was the general director. From 1957, Diebner was also a lecturer at the state School of Naval Engineers in Flensburg.

== Internal reports ==
The following reports were published in Kernphysikalische Forschungsberichte (Research Reports in Nuclear Physics), an internal publication of the German Uranverein. The reports were classified Top Secret, they had very limited distribution, and the authors were not allowed to keep copies. The reports were confiscated under the Allied Operation Alsos and sent to the United States Atomic Energy Commission for evaluation. In 1971, the reports were declassified and returned to Germany. The reports are available at the Karlsruhe Nuclear Research Center and the American Institute of Physics.

- F. Berkei, W. Borrmann, W. Czulius, Kurt Diebner, Georg Hartwig, K. H. Höcker, W. Herrmann, H. Pose, and Ernst Rexer Bericht über einen Würfelversuch mit Uranoxyd und Paraffin G-125 (dated before 26 November 1942)
- Kurt Diebner, Werner Czulius, W. Herrmann, Georg Hartwig, F. Berkei and E. Kamin Über die Neutronenvermehrung einer Anordnung aus Uranwürfeln und schwerem Wasser (G III) G-210
- Kurt Diebner, Georg Hartwig, W. Herrmann, H. Westmeyer, Werner Czulius, F. Berkei, and Karl-Heinz Höcker Vorläufige Mitteilung über einen Versuch mit Uranwüfeln und schwerem Eis als Bremssubstanz G-211 (April 1943)
- Kurt Diebner, Georg Hartwig, W. Herrmann, H. Westmeyer, Werner Czulius, F. Gerkei, and Karl-Heinz Höcker Bericht über einen Versuch mit Würfeln aus Uran-Metall und schwerem Eis G-212 (July 1943)

== Selected literature ==
- Kurt Diebner Der deutsche Forscheranteil, Die Zeit (18 August 1955) as cited in Hentschel and Hentschel, 1996, References, LX.
- Kurt Diebner (alias Werner Tautorus) Die Deutschen Geheimarbeiten zur Kernenergieverwertung während des zweiten Weldkrieges 1939-1945, Atomkernenergie Volume 1, 368–370 and 423–425 (1956) as cited in Hentschel and Hentschel, 1996, References, LX.

== Books ==
- Kurt Diebner and Eberhard Grassmann, Künstliche Radioaktivität (Hirzel, 1939)
- Dieter Bagge, Kurt Diebner, and Kenneth Jay Von der Uranspaltung bis Calder Hall (Rowohlt Taschenbuch Verlag, 1957)
- Erich Bagge and Kurt Diebner 10 Jahre Kernenergie-Studiengesellschaft 1955-1965 (Thiemig, 1965)
