= Victor S. Batista =

Argentine-American Theoretical Chemist

Victor S. Batista FRSC
- Born: Buenos Aires, Argentina
- Education: University of Buenos Aires (Lic. en C.Q.); Boston University (PhD)
- Known for: Development of semiclassical and quantum dynamics methods for photochemistry
- Awards: Sloan Fellowship (2005); Camille Dreyfus Teacher-Scholar Award (2005); NSF Career Award (2004); Fulbright Fellowship (2022)
- Scientific career
- Fields: Theoretical chemistry; Computational chemistry
- Workplaces: Yale University
- Doctoral advisor: David F. Coker
- Website: batistalab.com

Victor S. Batista is an Argentine-American theoretical and computational chemist. He is the John Gamble Kirkwood Professor of Chemistry at Yale University and a Fellow of the Royal Society of Chemistry. His work focuses on the development of semiclassical and quantum dynamics methods to study chemical processes such as photosynthesis and vision chemistry.

== Education and career ==
Batista earned a Licenciado en Ciencias Químicas from the University of Buenos Aires in 1989. He moved to the United States and received a PhD in theoretical chemistry from Boston University in 1996, working under the mentorship of David F. Coker. Following postdoctoral research appointments at the University of California, Berkeley with William H. Miller and at the University of Toronto with Paul Brumer, he joined the faculty at Yale University in 2001. At Yale, he was appointed the John Randolph Huffman Professor of Chemistry in 2019 and the John Gamble Kirkwood Professor of Chemistry in 2022.

He is the director of the Center for Quantum Dynamics on Modular Quantum Devices, one of the NSF Centers for Chemical Innovation.

== Research ==
Batista's research involves the creation and application of computational methods to simulate the dynamics of chemical reactions. His group has developed methods to study photoinduced processes in natural and artificial photosynthesis, the mechanism of rhodopsin in vision, and catalytic processes for CO2 reduction. His work also includes the development of quantum algorithms for chemistry applications on quantum computers.

== Awards and honors ==
- Fellow of the Royal Society of Chemistry (FRSC), 2022
- Fulbright Fellowship, 2022
- Camille Dreyfus Teacher-Scholar Award, 2005
- Sloan Fellowship, 2005
- NSF Career Award, 2004
