= Pechenkino =

Pechenkino Печенкино
- Selo
- Location within Bashkortostan Location within Russia
- Coordinates: 55°13′N 55°20′E
- Country: Russia
- Region: Bashkortostan
- District: Birsky District
- Time zone: UTC+5:00

Pechenkino (Russian: Печенкино) is a rural locality (a selo) and the administrative centre of Berezovsky Selsoviet, Birsky District, Bashkortostan, Russia. The population was 446 as of 2010. There are 9 streets.

== Geography ==
Pechenkino is located 35 km southwest of Birsk (the district's administrative centre) by road. Staroyezhovo is the nearest rural locality.
