= J. Hans D. Jensen =

German physicist (1907–1973)

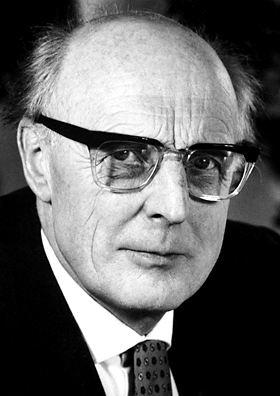
- Jensen in 1963
- Born: Johannes Hans Daniel Jensen; 25 June 1907; Hamburg, German Empire
- Died: 11 February 1973 (aged 65); Heidelberg, West Germany
- Education: University of Freiburg; University of Hamburg (PhD, DSc)
- Known for: Nuclear shell model
- Political party: NSDAP (from 1937)
- Awards: Nobel Prize in Physics (1963)
- Scientific career
- Fields: Physics
- Workplaces: University of Hamburg; Technische Hochschule Hannover; University of Heidelberg
- Doctoral advisor: Wilhelm Lenz
- Notable students: Hans-Arwed Weidenmüller; Heinz-Dieter Zeh

Johannes Hans Daniel Jensen (German: [ˈhans ˈjɛnzn̩]; 25 June 1907 – 11 February 1973) was a German theoretical physicist. During World War II, Jensen worked on the German nuclear energy project, known as the Uranium Club, where he contributed to the separation of uranium isotopes. After the war, Jensen was a professor at the University of Heidelberg. He was a visiting professor at the University of Wisconsin–Madison, the Institute for Advanced Study, University of California, Berkeley, Indiana University, and the California Institute of Technology.

Jensen was awarded the 1963 Nobel Prize in Physics along with Eugene Wigner and Maria Goeppert Mayer, sharing one half of the Prize with the latter "for their discoveries concerning nuclear shell structure."

== Biography ==
=== Education ===
Johannes Hans Daniel Jensen was born on 25 June 1907 in Hamburg, German Empire. Jensen studied physics, mathematics, physical chemistry, and philosophy at the universities of Freiburg and Hamburg, receiving a doctorate (Dr. rer. nat.) in Physics in 1932 from Hamburg, where he became a scientific assistant in the Institute for Theoretical Physics. He completed his habilitation at Hamburg in 1936.

=== Career ===
In 1937, Jensen became a docent at the University of Hamburg, and began working with Paul Harteck, Director of the university's Physical Chemistry Department and advisor to the Heereswaffenamt (HWA – Army Ordnance Office) on explosives. Harteck and his teaching assistant, Wilhelm Groth, made contact with the Reichskriegsministerium (RKM – Reich Ministry of War) on 24 April 1939 to tell them of potential military applications of nuclear chain reactions. Military control of the German nuclear energy project, also known as the Uranverein (Uranium Club), began on 1 September 1939, the day that Nazi Germany initiated World War II by invading Poland. Harteck, one of the principals in the Uranverein, brought Jensen into the project. Jensen's main thrust was on double centrifuges for separation of uranium isotopes (see the section below citing internal reports of the Uranverein). Harteck and Jensen developed a double centrifuge based on a rocking process (Schaukelverfahren) to facilitate the separation effect.

In 1941, Jensen was appointed Professor of Theoretical Physics at Technische Hochschule Hannover (now Leibniz University Hannover). In 1949, he became a professor at the University of Heidelberg, where he remained until his retirement in 1969.

Jensen was a guest professor at the University of Wisconsin–Madison (1951), the Institute for Advanced Study (1952), University of California, Berkeley (1952), Indiana University (1953), California Institute of Technology (1953), University of Minnesota, Twin Cities (1956), and University of California, San Diego (1961).

In 1963, Jensen shared half of the Nobel Prize in Physics with Maria Goeppert Mayer for their model of nuclear shells; the other half of the Prize was awarded to Eugene Wigner for unrelated work in nuclear and particle physics.

Jensen died on 11 February 1973 in Heidelberg at the age of 65.

== Party memberships ==
Adolf Hitler took power on 30 January 1933. On 7 April of that year the Law for the Restoration of the Professional Civil Service was enacted; this law, and its subsequent related ordinances, politicized the education system in Germany. Other factors enforcing the politicization of education were Nationalsozialistische Deutsche Arbeiterpartei (NSDAP – National Socialist German Workers Party) organizations in academia and the rise of the Deutsche Physik (Aryan Physics) movement, which was anti-Semitic and had a bias against theoretical physics, especially including quantum mechanics. The Party organizations were the Nationalsozialistischer Deutscher Studentenbund (NSDStB – National Socialist German Student League) founded in 1926, the Nationalsozialistischer Lehrerbund (NSLB, National Socialist Teachers League) founded in 1927, and the Nationalsozialistischer Deutscher Dozentenbund (NSDDB – National Socialist German University Lecturers League) founded in 1933. While membership in the NSDDB was not mandatory, it was tactically advantageous, if not unavoidable, as the district leaders had a decisive role in the acceptance of a Habilitationsschrift, which was a prerequisite to attaining the rank of Privatdozent necessary to becoming a university lecturer.

While all German universities were politicized, not all were as strict in carrying out this end as was the University of Hamburg, where Jensen received his doctorate and Habilitationsschrift. Upon his 1936 habilitation he had been a member of NSDDB for three years, the NSLB for two years, and a candidate for membership in NSDAP, which he received the next year. The university leader of NSLB had made it clear that active participation was expected from Jensen, and that is what they got.

After World War II the denazification process began. When Jensen faced the proceedings, he turned to Werner Heisenberg, a prominent member of the Uranverein, for a testament to his character—a document known as a Persilschein (whitewash certificate). Heisenberg was a particularly powerful writer of these documents; as he had never been a member of NSDAP, he had publicly clashed with NSDAP and the Schutzstaffel (SS), and was appointed by the British occupation authorities to the chair for theoretical physics and the directorship of the Max Planck Institute for Physics then in Göttingen. Heisenberg wrote the document and convinced the authorities that Jensen had joined the Party organizations only to avoid unnecessary difficulties in academia.

== Honors ==
Honors conferred upon Jensen include:

- 1947: Honorary professor at the University of Hamburg
- 1963: Nobel Prize in Physics – jointly with Maria Goeppert Mayer "for their discoveries concerning nuclear shell structure"
- 1964: Honorary doctorate from the University of Hannover
- 1969: Honorary citizen of Fort Lauderdale, Florida

== Internal reports ==
The following reports were published in Kernphysikalische Forschungsberichte (Research Reports in Nuclear Physics), an internal publication of the German Uranverein. The reports were classified Top Secret, they had very limited distribution, and the authors were not allowed to keep copies. The reports were confiscated under the Allied Operation Alsos and sent to the United States Atomic Energy Commission for evaluation. In 1971 the reports were declassified and returned to Germany. The reports are available at the Karlsruhe Nuclear Research Center and the American Institute of Physics.

- Paul Harteck, Johannes Jensen, Friedrich Knauer, and Hans Suess Über die Bremsung, die Diffusion und den Einfang von Neutronen in fester Kohlensäure und über ihren Einfang in Uran G-36 (19 August 1940)
- Paul Harteck and Johannes Jesnsen Der Thermodiffusionseffekt im Zusammenspiel mit der Konvektion durch mechanisch bewegte Wände und Vergleich mit der Thermosiphonwirkung G-89 (18 February 1941)
- Johannes Jensen Über die Ultrazentrifugenmethode zur Trennung der Uranisotope G-95 (December 1941)
- Paul Harteck and Johannes Jensen Gerechnung des Trenneffektes und der Ausbeute verschiedner Zentrifugenanordnungen zur Erhöhung des Wirkungsgrades einer einselnen Zentrifuge G-158 (February 1943)
- Paul Harteck, Johannes Jensen, and Albert Suhr Über den Zusammenhang zwischen Ausbeute und Trennschärfe bei der Niederdruckkolonne G-159

== Works ==
=== Books ===
- Konrad Beyerle, Wilhelm Groth, Paul Harteck, and Johannes Jensen Über Gaszentrifugen: Anreicherung der Xenon-, Krypton- und der Selen-Isotope nach dem Zentrifugenverfahren (Chemie, 1950); cited in Walker, 1993, p. 278

=== Articles ===
- Otto Haxel, J. Hans D. Jensen, and Hans E. Suess On the "Magic Numbers" in Nuclear Structure, Phys. Rev. Volume 75, 1766 - 1766 (1949). Institutional affiliations: Haxel: Max-Planck Institut für Physik, Göttingen; Jensen: Institut für theoretische Physik, Heidelberg; and Suess: Inst. für physikalische Chemie, Hamburg. Received 18 April 1949.
- Helmut Steinwedel, J. Hans D. Jensen, and Peter Jensen Nuclear Dipole Vibrations, Phys. Rev. Volume 79, Issue 6, 1019 - 1019 (1950). Institutional affiliations: Steinwedel and J. H. D. Jensen - Institut für theoretische Physik, Universität Heidelberg and Peter Jensen - Physikalisches Institut, Universität Freiburg. Received 10 July 1950.

== Sources ==
- Beyerchen, Alan D. Scientists Under Hitler: Politics and the Physics Community in the Third Reich (Yale, 1977) ISBN 0-300-01830-4
- Hentschel, Klaus, editor and Ann M. Hentschel, editorial assistant and Translator Physics and National Socialism: An Anthology of Primary Sources (Birkhäuser, 1996) ISBN 0-8176-5312-0
- Hoffmann, Dieter Between Autonomy and Accommodation: The German Physical Society during the Third Reich, Physics in Perspective 7(3) 293-329 (2005)
- Jensen, J. Hans D. Glimpses at the History of the Nuclear Structure Theory, The Nobel Prize in Physics 1963 (12 December 1963) J. Hans D. Jensen on Nobelprize.org
- Schaaf, Michael Heisenberg, Hitler und die Bombe. Gespräche mit Zeitzeugen (GNT-Verlag, Diepholz 2018) ISBN 978-3-86225-115-5
- Stech, Berthold J.H.D. Jensen: Personal recollection University of Heidelberg
- Walker, Mark German National Socialism and the Quest for Nuclear Power 1939–1949 (Cambridge, 1993) ISBN 0-521-43804-7
