= Robert Döpel =

German nuclear physicist (1895-1982)

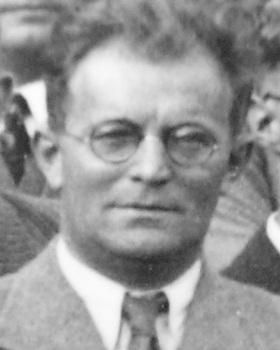
- Robert Döpel (1895—1982), c.. 1935.
- Born: Georg Robert Döpel; December 3, 1895; Neustadt an der Orla, Saxe-Weimar-Eisenach, German Empire
- Died: December 2, 1982 (aged 86); Ilmenau, East Germany
- Citizenship: Germany
- Education: Ludwig-Maximilians-Universität München; University of Jena; Leipzig University
- Known for: Soviet program of nuclear weapons Uranium Club
- Spouse: Klara Mannss (m. 1935–45)
- Awards: Patriotic Order of Merit
- Scientific career
- Fields: Nuclear physics
- Workplaces: Technische Universität Ilmenau; NII-9 in Moscow; Leipzig University; University of Würzburg; University of Göttingen
- Thesis: Elektromagnetische Analyse von Kanalstrahlen. (1925)
- Doctoral advisor: Wilhelm Wien

Georg Robert Döpel (3 December 1895 – 2 December 1982), best known as Robert Döpel, was a German nuclear physicist and a professor of physics at the Technische Universität Ilmenau in Germany.

An early participant of the German program, the Uranprojekt, in 1939, Döpel was later taken into Soviet custody and held in Russia after World War II. There, Döpel was one of many German nuclear physicists working in the Soviet program of nuclear weapons in 1945. As opposed to his fellow German scientists, Döpel was held in Russia for a longer time and was not allowed to return to his homeland until 1957, only to teach physics at the Technische Universität Ilmenau, Germany.

His later career focused in climate physics, concerning the topics of global warming before passing in Ilmenau in 1982, aged 86.

== Early life ==
Döpel was born in Neustadt, which is a small town in Saale-Orla-Kreis, Thuringia, Germany on 3 December 1895. From 1919—1925, he studied and attained degrees in physics from Leipzig University, the University of Jena, and the Ludwig-Maximilians-Universität München where he attended the doctoral program and did his fundamental research on the Anode ray under Physics Nobel Laureate Wilhelm Wien, prior awarding his PhD in physics in 1924—25.

== Career ==
=== Academia and Uranprojkt ===
After receipt of his doctorate, Döpel became Robert W. Pohl teaching assistant at the University of Göttingen, initially teaching courses on physics at an undergraduate level. He continued his work on the canal rays, which were the basis of his doctoral thesis, at the private laboratory of Rudolf Freihern von Hirsch zu Planegg, just west of Munich, along with the Physics Nobel Laureate Johannes Stark. In 1929, he accepted a teaching position at the University of Würzburg, and in 1932, became qualified as privatdozent in physics.

In 1939, Döpel became an extraordinarius professor at Leipzig University, where he was a colleague of Werner Heisenberg. At some point, Döpel succeeded Fritz Kirchner as professor of radiation heat transfer.

On 22 April 1939, after hearing a paper by Wilhelm Hanle on the use of uranium fission in a Uranmaschine (uranium machine, i.e., nuclear reactor), Georg Joos, along with Hanle, notified Wilhelm Dames, at the Ministry of Education, of potential military applications of nuclear energy. Just seven days later, a group, organized by Dames, met at the Ministry of Education to discuss the potential of a sustained nuclear chain reaction. Their Working Community for Nuclear Physics was known informally as the first Uranverein (Uranium Club) and included the physicists Walther Bothe, Wilhelm Hanle, his friend Robert Döpel, Hans Geiger, Wolfgang Gentner, Gerhard Hoffmann, and Joos. Informal work began at the University of Göttingen by Joos, Hanle, and their colleague Reinhold Mannkopff. Their work was discontinued in August 1939, when the three were called to military training.

The second Uranverein began after the Army Ordnance Office squeezed out the Imperial Research Council of the Ministry of Education and started the formal German program on develoing the nuclear weapons. The first meeting was held on 16 September 1939. A second meeting soon thereafter included Klaus Clusius, Carl Friedrich von Weizsäcker, Werner Heisenberg and Robert Döpel, his counterpart as an experimental physicist at the University of Leipzig. Here, Heisenberg was the director of the Department of Theoretical Physics until 1942.

In August 1940, Döpel showed the utility of using heavy water as a moderator in a research nuclear reactor (uranmaschine). together with his wife Klara– a paralegal professional who worked as technician and married Döpel in 1935 and she worked with him in Leipzig without wages. They conducted experiments with a spherical geometry (hollow spheres) of uranium surrounded by heavy water. Trial L-I was done in August 1940, and L-II was conducted six months later. Results from trial L-IV, in the first half of 1942, indicated that the spherical geometry, with five metric tons of heavy water and 10 metric tons of metallic uranium, could sustain a fission reaction. So, "the Germans were the first physicists in the world, with their Leipzig pile L-IV, to achieve positive neutron production." The results were set forth in an article by Döpel, Döpel's wife, and W. Heisenberg. The article was published at first in the Research Reports in Nuclear Physics, a classified internal reporting reports of the German Uranium Club. In 1942, the supervision of the Uranverein was transferred from the Army Ordnance Office to the Imperial Research Council.

In June 1942, Döpel's uranmaschine was destroyed by a low-speed detonation induced by hydrogen formation. This was the first in a series of accidents that destroyed nuclear energy assemblies due to wrong hydrogen handling. Already afore, a shift of the main works of Heisenberg towards the Kaiser Wilhelm-Institute for Physics (after World War II the Max Planck Institute for Physics) in Berlin was decided. The Döpels didn't follow him despite his wishes, and they retired thereby from the uranium project. This finished the work on this topic at Leipzig.

In a letter written in December 1943, Döpel recounted that allied air raids had destroyed 75% of Leipzig, including his institute. The Russian air raids during that year had also burned down Döpel's institute apartment and Heisenberg's house in Leipzig. Sixteen months later, on April 6, 1945–just 32 days before the surrender of Germany– Klara was killed in an air raid, while she was working in the physics building.

=== Soviet program of nuclear weapons ===
Near the close of World War II, the Soviet Union sent special search teams into Germany to locate and deport German nuclear scientists or any others who could be of use to the Soviet atomic bomb project. The Russian Alsos teams were headed by NKVD security operative Avraami Zavenyagin and staffed with numerous scientists, from their only nuclear laboratory, attired in NKVD officer's uniforms. The main search team, headed by Colonel General Zavenyagin, arrived in Berlin on 3 May, the day after Russia announced the fall of Berlin to their military forces; it included Colonel General V. A. Makhnjov, and nuclear physicists Yulij Borisovich Khariton, Isaak Konstantinovich Kikoin, and Lev Andreevich Artsimovich. Döpel was sent to the Soviet Union to work on their atomic bomb effort.

At first, he worked at the Nauchno-Issledovatel'skij Institut-9 (NII-9, Scientific Research Institute No. 9), in Moscow. There, he worked with Max Volmer on the production of heavy water.

=== Back in Germany ===
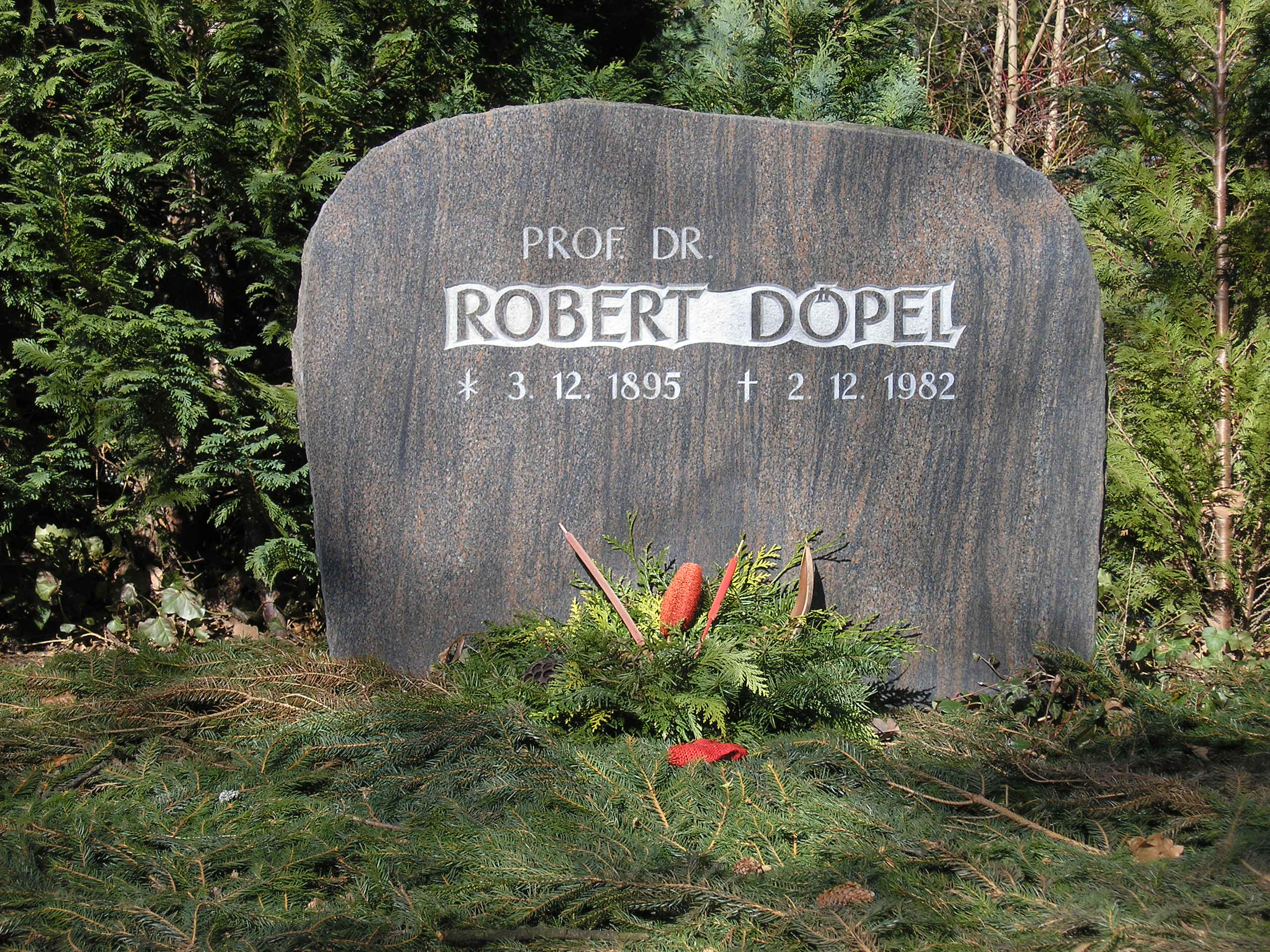
The grave of Robert Döpel (1895-1982) at the courtyard of Technical University of Ilmenau in 2010.

In 1957, the Soviet government allowed Döpel to be returned to East Germany after he accepted a technical and teaching position at the Technische Universität Ilmenau in his birth town. There, he became professor of physics and directed an Institute for Applied Physics of the Technische Universität Ilmenau. Döpel conducted research on the experimental physics and conducted investigations on the spectral analysis of the mechanism of electric discharges in gases.

Later on, he was engaged in energetics in connection with waste heat and global warming problems. With his zero-dimensional climate model, he estimated global warming contributions from waste heat for coming centuries which have been confirmed meanwhile by more refined model calculations. He died in Ilmenau in 1982. In honour of his 100th birthday in 1995, there were solemn colloquia at the Universities of Ilmenau and of Leipzig.

== Internal reports ==
The following reports were published in Kernphysikalische Forschungsberichte (Research Reports in Nuclear Physics), an internal publication of the German Uranverein. The reports were classified top secret, they had very limited distribution, and the authors were not allowed to keep copies. The reports were confiscated under the Allied Operation Alsos and sent to the United States Atomic Energy Commission for evaluation. In 1971, the reports were declassified and returned to Germany. The reports are available at the Karlsruhe Nuclear Research Center and the American Institute of Physics.

- Robert Döpel, K. Döpel, and Werner Heisenberg Bestimmung der Diffusionslänge thermischer Neutronen in Präparat 38 (5 December 1940). G-22.
- Robert Döpel, K. Döpel, and Werner Heisenberg Bestimmung der Diffusionslänge thermischer Neutronen in schwerem Wasser (7 August 1940). G-23.
- Robert Döpel, K. Döpel, and Werner Heisenberg Versuche mit Schichtenanordnungen von D_{2}O und 38 (28 October 1941). G-75.
- Robert Döpel Bericht über Unfälle beim Umgang mit Uranmetall (9 July 1942). G-135.
- Robert Döpel, K. Döpel, and Werner Heisenberg Der experimentelle Nachweis der effektiven Neutronenvermehrung in einem Kugel-Schichten-System aus D_{2}O und Uran-Metall (July 1942). G-136.
- Robert Döpel, K. Döpel, and Werner Heisenberg Die Neutronenvermehrung in einem D_{2}O-38-Metallschichtensystem (March 1942). G-373.

== Selected literature ==
- Robert Döpel Elektromagnetische Analyse von Kanalstrahlen, Annalen der Physik Volume 381, Number 1, 1-28 (1925)
- Robert Döpel Über den selektiven Photoeffekt am Strontium, Zeitschrift für Physik Volume 33, Number 1, 237-245 (December, 1925). The author was identified as being at the I. physikalisches Institut der Universität, Göttingen. The article was received on 3 June 1925.
- Robert Döpel Kernprozesse bei der mittleren Korpuskularenergie von Sternzentren, Naturwissenschaften Volume 24, Number 15, 237- (April, 1936)

== Books ==
- Robert Döpel Kanalstrahlröhren als Ionenquellen (Akademie-Verlag Berlin, 1958)
- Werner Heisenberg, Robert Döpel, Wilhelm Hanle, and Käthe Mitzenheim Werner Heisenberg in Leipzig 1927-1942 (C. Kleint and G. Wiemers [Eds.]: Abhandlungen der sächsischen Akademie der Wissenschaften zu Leipzig, Mathemat.-Naturwissenschaftliche Klasse; Vol. 58/2, Akademie-Verlag Berlin 1993. Pocketbook: Wiley-VCH, Weinheim 1993)

== Bibliography ==
- Arnold, Heinrich: Robert Döpel and his Model of Global Warming. An Early Warning – and its Update. (2013) online. 1st ed.: Robert Döpel und sein Modell der globalen Erwärmung. Eine frühe Warnung - und die Aktualisierung. Universitätsverlag Ilmenau 2009, ISBN 978-3-939473-50-3
- Arnold, Heinrich, Global Warming by Anthropogenic Heat, a Main Problem of Fusion Techniques. 2016-07-13 (Digitale Bibiliothek Thueringen)
- Hentschel, Klaus (editor) and Ann M. Hentschel (editorial assistant and translator) Physics and National Socialism: An Anthology of Primary Sources (Birkhäuser, 1996) ISBN 0-8176-5312-0
- Kant, Horst Werner Heisenberg and the German Uranium Project / Otto Hahn and the Declarations of Mainau and Göttingen, Preprint 203 (Max-Planck Institut für Wissenschaftsgeschichte, 2002)
- Kruglov, Akadii The History of the Soviet Atomic Industry (Taylor and Francis, 2002)
- Maddrell, Paul Spying on Science: Western Intelligence in Divided Germany 1945–1961 (Oxford, 2006) ISBN 0-19-926750-2
- Macrakis, Kristie Surviving the Swastika: Scientific Research in Nazi Germany (Oxford, 1993)
- Oleynikov, Pavel V. German Scientists in the Soviet Atomic Project, The Nonproliferation Review Volume 7, Number 2, 1 – 30 (2000). The author has been a group leader at the Institute of Technical Physics of the Russian Federal Nuclear Center in Snezhinsk (Chelyabinsk-70).
- Riehl, Nikolaus and Frederick Seitz Stalin's Captive: Nikolaus Riehl and the Soviet Race for the Bomb (American Chemical Society and the Chemical Heritage Foundations, 1996) ISBN 0-8412-3310-1.
- Walker, Mark German National Socialism and the Quest for Nuclear Power 1939–1949 (Cambridge, 1993) ISBN 0-521-43804-7
