= Paul Harteck =

German chemist (1902–1985)

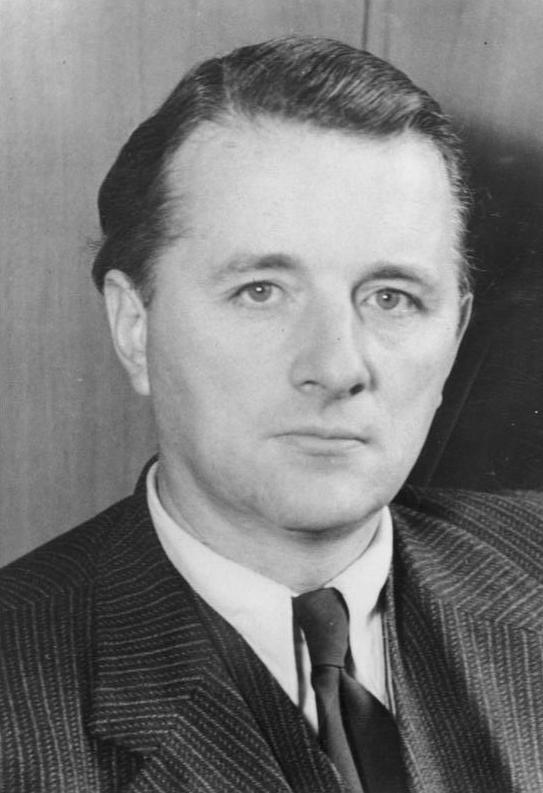
- 1948
- Born: Paul Karl Maria Harteck; 20 July 1902; Vienna, Austria-Hungary
- Died: 22 January 1985 (aged 82); Santa Barbara, California, U.S.
- Education: Humboldt University of Berlin
- Awards: Wilhelm Exner Medal; 1961
- Scientific career
- Fields: Physical chemistry
- Workplaces: University of Breslau,
- Doctoral advisor: Max Bodenstein

Paul Karl Maria Harteck (20 July 1902 – 22 January 1985) was an Austrian physical chemist. In 1945 under Operation Epsilon in "the big sweep" throughout Germany, Harteck was arrested by the allied British and American Armed Forces for suspicion of aiding the Nazis in their nuclear weapons program and he was incarcerated at Farm Hall, an English house fitted with covert electronic listening devices, for six months.

== Education ==
Harteck studied chemistry at the University of Vienna and the Humboldt University of Berlin from 1921 to 1924. He received his doctorate at the latter under Max Bodenstein in 1926. From 1926 to 1928 he was Arnold Eucken’s teaching assistant at the University of Breslau.

== Career ==
From 1928 to 1933, Harteck was a staff scientist at the KWI für physikalische Chemie und Elektrochemie (KWIPC) (Kaiser Wilhelm Institute for Physical Chemistry and Elektrochemistry) located in Dahlem-Berlin, where he worked with Karl Friedrich Bonhoeffer on experiments on parahydrogen and orthohydrogen. While at the KWIPC, he completed his habilitation in 1931 at the Humboldt University of Berlin where he also supervised the dissertation of Karl-Hermann Geib who later developed the Girdler sulfide process.

In 1933, Harteck went to do research with Ernest Rutherford at the University of Cambridge. During this time, Rutherford was working on accelerator-driven nuclear fusion, and Harteck was credited in the 1934 paper on the topic.

Upon his return from England in 1934, he became an ordinarius professor and director of the physical chemistry department at the University of Hamburg. From 1937, he was an advisor to the Heereswaffenamt (HWA, Army Ordnance Office). In April 1939, along with his teaching assistant Wilhelm Groth, Harteck made contact with the Reichskriegsministerium (RKM, Reich Ministry of War) to alert them to the potential of military applications of nuclear chain reactions. From that year, his department as a whole did research for the HWA, with emphasis on uranium isotope separation. From 1940, with Hans Suess, his focus was on the use of heavy water as a neutron moderator. In 1941, his department constructed a conversion unit for, then I.G. Farben controlled, Norsk Hydro in German-occupied Norway for the catalytic production of heavy water. The Norwegians were forced to install the plant at their own cost, as their contribution to German war effort. In 1942, with the help of Werner Heisenberg, Harteck circumvented an appointment in Russia. In February 1943, Harteck and his colleague Johannes Jensen suggested a new type of centrifugal isotope separation, which was adopted by the Anschütz Company. Under his supervision Wilhelm Groth conducted the last enrichment experiments with the ultracentrifuge in Celle, a small town 120 km south of Hamburg. In late spring 1945, Harteck was arrested by the allied British and American Armed Forces and incarcerated at Farm Hall for six months under Operation Epsilon. In 1946, upon his return from incarceration, he became director of the chemistry department at the University, a position he held until 1950.

In 1951, Harteck emigrated to the United States to become the Distinguished Research Professor of Physical Chemistry at the Rensselaer Polytechnic Institute in Troy, New York. In 1937, 1952 and 1972, he was nominated for the Nobel Prize in Chemistry. At the Rensselaer Polytechnic Institute he provided leadership in chemical kinetics, and especially in atom and radiation chemistry. He continued research in nitrogen reactions and the fixation of nitrogen and the new field of research in the investigation of the chemistry and photochemistry of the upper atmosphere, including planetary atmospheres. He retired from Rensselaer in 1982 and died at his home in Santa Barbara, California in 1985.

== Honors and awards ==
Harteck was the recipient of numerous awards during his career and was awarded several honors due to his pioneering work in the study of parahydrogen, production and reactions of oxygen atoms, xenon (photochemical) lamp, gas centrifuge enrichment of isotopes, and photochemical isotope separation. He was the recipient of the Jean Servais Stas Medal (1957) and the Wilhelm Exner Medal (1961). He received an honorary doctoral degree in 1966 from the University of Bonn. In 1977 he was a co-recipient of the Krupp Award (1977) by the Alfried Krupp von Bohlen und Halbach Foundation for his efforts on isotope separation. He was elected as an honorary member of the Société Royale de Chimie Belgique and was awarded the Grand Decoration of Honor of Austria in 1978.

== Paul Harteck Lecture Series ==
After his retirement in 1982, the Rensselaer Polytechnic Institute established the prestigious Paul Harteck Lecture Series, which recognizes internationally exceptional contributions to the advancement of Physical Chemistry. There have been 19 recipients of the lectureship in the period 1982-2026, including five Nobel Laureates.

=== Lecturers ===
Year	Lecturer	Affiliation	Lecture title
1982	John C. Polanyi	University of Toronto	In the Footsteps of Paul Harteck: What We Can Learn from Feeble Luminescence
1983	Peter P. Sorokin	IBM	Study of Chemical Transients by Time-Resolved Infrared Spectral Photography
1984	Isaac F. Silvera	Harvard University	Hydrogen and Ultrahigh Pressure New States of Simple Matter
1985	Gerhard Herzberg	National Research Council Canada	Spectra and Structure of Molecular Ions
1986	Jerome Karle	Naval Research Laboratory	Structural Chemistry from X-Ray Diffraction
1987	Ivar Giaever	Rensselaer Polytechnic Institute and General Electric Research Laboratory	Detection of Cells and Enzymes Using an Electric Field
1988	Dudley R. Herschbach	Harvard University	Electronic Structure in Strange Dimensions
1990	Johannes Georg Bednorz	IBM Research – Zurich	High Temperature Superconductivity - A Challenge
2000	Andreas C. Albrecht	Cornell University	The Nonlinear Spectroscopies: Ultrashort Timing and Precise Frequency Measurements with Noisy Light
2006	Richard P. Van Duyne	Northwestern University	Molecular Plasmonics for Surface Enhanced Sensing and Spectroscopy
2007	Lewis E. Kay	University of Toronto	Seeing the Invisible by Solution NMR Spectroscopy
2009	Edward I. Solomon	Stanford University	Spectroscopic Methods in Bioinorganic Chemistry: Blue to Green to Red Copper Sites
2010	James H. Prestegard	University of Georgia	Carbohydrates as Mediators of Cell-cell Communication
2014	Lene Vestergaard Hau	Harvard University	Quantum Control of Light and Matter: From the Macroscopic to the Nanoscale
2016	Cynthia M. Friend	Harvard University	Informing Catalyst Design Through Fundamental Studies
2018	Gregory D. Scholes	Princeton University	Probing Ultrafast Chemical Dynamics Inspired by the Rhythms of Fireflies
2024	Gabriela Schlau-Cohen	Massachusetts Institute of Technology	Why Don't Plants Get Sunburn?
2024	Victor S. Batista	Yale University	Simulating Chemistry on Bosonic Quantum Devices
2026	Dimitrios A. Pantazis	Max Planck Society	Molecular Principles of Solar Energy Conversion in Photosynthesis

== Internal reports ==
The following reports were published in Kernphysikalische Forschungsberichte (Research Reports in Nuclear Physics), an internal publication of the German Uranverein. The reports were classified Top Secret, they had very limited distribution, and the authors were not allowed to keep copies. The reports were confiscated under the Allied Operation Alsos and sent to the United States Atomic Energy Commission for evaluation. In 1971, the reports were declassified and returned to Germany. The reports are available at the Karlsruhe Nuclear Research Center and the American Institute of Physics.

- Paul Harteck, Johannes Jensen, Friedrich Knauer, and Hans Suess Über die Bremsung, die Diffusion und den Einfang von Neutronen in fester Kohlensäure und über ihren Einfang in Uran G-36 (19 August 1940)
- Paul Harteck Die Produktion von schwerem Wasser G-86 (December 1941)
- Paul Harteck Die Trennung der Uranisotope G-88 (December 1941)
- Paul Harteck and Johannes Jensen Der Thermodiffusionseffekt im Zusammenspiel mit der Konvektion durch mechanisch bewegte Wände und Vergleich mit der Thermosiphonwirkung G-89 (18 February 1941)
- Paul Harteck Die Gewinnung von schwerem Wasser G-154 (26 February 1942)
- Paul Harteck and Johannes Jensen Berechnung des Trenneffektes und der Ausbeute verschiedener Zentrifugenanordnungen zur Erhöhung des Wirkungsgrades einer einzelnen Zentrifuge G-158 (February 1943)
- Paul Harteck, Johannes Jensen, and Albert Suhr Über den Zusammenhang zwischen Ausbeute und Trennschärfe bei der Niederdruckkolonne G-159
- Paul Harteck Paul Harteck’s Institute Papers, Volume 1-6 G-341

== Selected publications ==
=== Articles ===
- A. Farkas, L. Farkas, P. Harteck Experiments on Heavy Hydrogen. II. The Ortho-Para Conversion, Proceedings of the Royal Society of London. Series A. Vol. 144, No. 852, pp. 481–493 (29 March 1934)
- M. L. E. Oliphant, P. Harteck, Lord Rutherford Transmutation Effects Observed with Heavy Hydrogen, Proceedings of the Royal Society of London. Series A. Vol. 144, No. 853, pp. 692–703 (1 May 1934)

=== Books ===
- K. F. Bonhoeffer and P. Harteck, Grundlagen Der PhotoChemie (Verlag Von Theodor Steinkopff, 1933)
- Konrad Beyerle, Wilhelm Groth, Paul Harteck, and Johannes Jensen Über Gaszentrifugen: Anreicherung der Xenon-, Krypton- und der Selen-Isotope nach dem Zentrifugenverfahren (Chemie, 1950); cited in Walker, 1993, 278.
