= Reich Ministry of Science, Education and Culture =

Organization in Germany

- Reichsministerium für Wissenschaft, Erziehung und Volksbildung

Agency overview
- Formed: 1 May 1934
- Dissolved: 23 May 1945
- Jurisdiction: Government of Nazi Germany
- Minister responsible: Bernhard Rust

The Reich Ministry of Science, Education and Culture (German: Reichsministerium für Wissenschaft, Erziehung und Volksbildung, also unofficially known as the "Reich Education Ministry" (German: Reichserziehungsministerium), or "REM") existed from 1934 until 1945 under the leadership of Bernhard Rust and was responsible for unifying the education system of Nazi Germany and aligning it with the goals of Nazi leadership.

== Background ==
The REM was the successor to the former Preußisches Ministerium für Wissenschaft, Kunst und Volksbildung (Prussian Ministry of Science, Art and Culture), creating for the first time in Germany a centralized and hierarchical institution in control of the Reich's education sector. In 1934, the REM took over from the Reichsinnenministerium (Reich Interior Ministry) the supervision of colleges and universities in Germany, as well as research institutions such as the Physikalisch-Technische Reichsanstalt (abbreviated PTR; translation: Reich Physical and Technical Institute.); today, the PTR is known as the Physikalisch-Technische Bundesanstalt.

== Administrators ==
No.	Portrait	Minister of Culture	Took office	Left office	Time in office	Party	Cabinet	Ref.
1	Bernhard Rust	Bernhard Rust (1883–1945)	1 May 1934	30 April 1945	10 years, 333 days	NSDAP	Hitler	
2	Gustav Adolf Scheel	Gustav Adolf Scheel (1907–1979)	30 April 1945	3 May 1945	3 days	NSDAP	Goebbels	–
3	Wilhelm Stuckart	Wilhelm Stuckart (1902–1953)	3 May 1945	23 May 1945	20 days	NSDAP	Flensburg Government	

=== Heads of the REM Amt für Wissenschaft (Science Office) ===
Portrait	Name	Took office	Left office
	Theodor Vahlen	1934	1937
–	Otto Wacker	1937	1939
	Rudolf Mentzel	May 1939	1945

== Bibliography ==
- Hentschel, Klaus, editor, and Ann M. Hentschel, editorial assistant and Translator. Physics and National Socialism: An Anthology of Primary Sources (Birkhäuser, 1996)
