= Index of physics articles (K) =

The index of physics articles is split into multiple pages due to its size.

To navigate by individual letter use the table of contents below.

== K ==
- K-65 residues
- K-Long
- K-Poincaré algebra
- K-Poincaré group
- K-Short
- K-edge
- K-factor (aerospace)
- K-factor (centrifugation)
- K-theory (physics)
- K. R. Ramanathan
- K. R. Sreenivasan
- K2K experiment
- K3 surface
- KALI (laser)
- KAMINI
- KAON Factory
- KARMEN
- KASCADE
- KAT-7
- KATRIN
- KEK
- KEKB (accelerator)
- KM3NeT
- KMQ viewer
- KMS state
- KOALA – Quasi Laue Diffractometer
- KOWARI
- KSTAR
- KT (energy)
- K band (IEEE)
- K band (infrared)
- K band (NATO)
- K correction
- Ka band
- Kadomtsev–Petviashvili equation
- Kadowaki–Woods ratio
- Kagome lattice
- Kai-Ming Ho
- Kai Puolamäki
- Kai Siegbahn
- Kaido Reivelt
- Kalb–Ramond field
- Kalina cycle
- Kalliroscope
- Kaluza–Klein theory
- Kamaloddin Jenab
- Kamioka Liquid Scintillator Antineutrino Detector
- Kamioka Observatory
- Kammback
- Kamran Vafa
- Kaon
- Kaon oscillation
- Kaonic hydrogen
- Kaonium
- Kapitsa–Dirac effect
- Kaplan–Yorke map
- Karatmeter
- Karel Niessen
- Karen Kavanagh
- Karen Ter-Martirosian
- Kari Enqvist
- Kariamanickam Srinivasa Krishnan
- Karl-Heinrich Riewe
- Karl-Heinz Höcker
- Karl-Henning Rehren
- Karl-Otto Kiepenheuer
- Karl Alexander Müller
- Karl Baedeker (scientist)
- Karl Bechert
- Karl Eugen Guthe
- Karl Ferdinand Braun
- Karl Friedrich Küstner
- Karl G. Kessler
- Karl Glitscher
- Karl Guthe Jansky
- Karl Heinz Beckurts
- Karl Herzfeld
- Karl Ledersteger
- Karl Leo
- Karl Lintner
- Karl Meissner
- Karl Mey
- Karl Scheel
- Karl Schwarzschild
- Karl Taylor Compton
- Karl Weissenberg
- Karl Wirtz
- Karl Zimmer
- Karol Olszewski
- Kasner metric
- Kasson S. Gibson
- Katabatic wind
- Kate Hutton
- Kater's pendulum
- Katharine Burr Blodgett
- Katherine Freese
- Katherine McAlpine
- Katherine Sopka
- Kathy Sykes
- Kato theorem
- Katsunori Wakabayashi
- Kaufmann (Scully) vortex
- Kautsky effect
- Kauzmann paradox
- Kavli Institute for Theoretical Physics
- Kavli Institute of Nanoscience
- Kaye effect
- Kazim Ergin
- Kazimierz Fajans
- Kazuhiko Nishijima
- Kazys Almenas
- Keiiti Aki
- Keith Brueckner
- Keith Burnett
- Keith Burton
- Keith Edward Bullen
- Keith Nugent
- Keith Runcorn
- Kelly Johnson (engineer)
- Kelvin
- Kelvin's circulation theorem
- Kelvin-Planck statement
- Kelvin material
- Kelvin probe force microscope
- Kelvin water dropper
- Kelvin wave
- Kelvin–Helmholtz instability
- Kelvin–Helmholtz mechanism
- Kelvin–Voigt material
- Ken Pounds
- Ken Riley (physicist)
- Kendal Nezan
- Kender engine
- Kennedy–Thorndike experiment
- Kenneth Allen (physicist)
- Kenneth Bainbridge
- Kenneth G. Libbrecht
- Kenneth G. Wilson
- Kenneth H. Hunt
- Kenneth Lane (physicist)
- Kenneth M. Baird
- Kenneth Mees
- Kenneth Nordtvedt
- Kenneth Ross MacKenzie
- Kenneth Stewart Cole
- Kepler's laws of planetary motion
- Kepler orbit
- Kepler problem
- Keplerian problem
- Kerma (physics)
- Kern arc
- Kerr-lens modelocking
- Kerr Grant
- Kerr cell shutter
- Kerr effect
- Kerr metric
- Kerr–Newman metric
- Kerson Huang
- Keulegan–Carpenter number
- Kharkiv Theoretical Physics School
- Khālid ibn ʿAbd al‐Malik al‐Marwarrūdhī
- Kibble balance
- Kiel probe
- Killing horizon
- Killing spinor
- Kilogram
- Kilogram per cubic metre
- Kilometre
- Kim Maltman
- Kim Sung-Hou
- Kim Weaver
- Kinematic diagram
- Kinematic pair
- Kinematics
- Kinetic Monte Carlo
- Kinetic energy
- Kinetic inductance
- Kinetic inductance detector
- Kinetic momentum
- Kinetic term
- Kinetic theory
- Kinetics (physics)
- Kingdon trap
- Kip Siegel
- Kip Thorne
- Kirchhoff's circuit laws
- Kirchhoff's diffraction formula
- Kirchhoff's law of thermal radiation
- Kirchhoff equations
- Kirpal Nandra
- Kirstine Meyer
- Kite types
- Kjell Henriksen
- Klara Döpel
- Klaus Blaum
- Klaus Fesser
- Klaus Fuchs
- Klaus Kern
- Klaus von Klitzing
- Kleemenko cycle
- Klein paradox
- Klein transformation
- Klein–Gordon equation
- Klemperer rosette
- Klystron
- Klystron tube
- Knapp's rule
- Knight shift
- Knudsen cell
- Knudsen diffusion
- Knudsen equation
- Knudsen flow
- Knudsen gas
- Knudsen layer
- Knudsen number
- Knut Ångström
- Kochen–Specker theorem
- Kodama state
- Koenig's manometric flame apparatus
- Kogut–Susskind fermion
- Kohn anomaly
- Kohn effect
- Kohn–Sham equations
- Koide formula
- Kolmogorov–Arnold–Moser theorem
- Komar mass
- Kondo effect
- Konishi anomaly
- Konrad Beyerle
- Konrad Bleuler
- Konrad Dannenberg
- Konstantin Novoselov
- Konstanty Zakrzewski
- Kopp's law
- Korringa–Kohn–Rostoker approximation
- Kort nozzle
- Korteweg–de Vries equation
- Kossel
- Kosterlitz–Thouless transition
- Kozeny–Carman equation
- Kramers' law
- Kramers theorem
- Kramers–Heisenberg formula
- Kramers–Kronig relations
- Kramers–Wannier duality
- Krasovskii–LaSalle principle
- Kratos MS 50
- Kreft's dichromaticity index
- Kretschmann scalar
- Kristian Birkeland
- Kristian Fossheim
- Kronig–Penney model
- Krueger flaps
- Kruskal–Szekeres coordinates
- Krylov–Bogolyubov theorem
- Krypton fluoride laser
- Kröger–Vink notation
- Ku band
- Kugelblitz (astrophysics)
- Kugel–Khomskii coupling
- Kullback–Leibler divergence
- Kundt's tube
- Kuramoto model
- Kurchatov Medal
- Kurd von Mosengeil
- Kurt Binder
- Kurt Diebner
- Kurt Gottfried
- Kurt Lehovec
- Kurt Mendelssohn
- Kurt Symanzik
- Kurt Wiesenfeld
- Kutta condition
- Kutta–Joukowski theorem
- Kuznetsov NK-14
- Kuzyk quantum gap
- Kyong Wonha
- Kyriakos Tamvakis
- K·p perturbation theory
- Kármán line
- Kármán vortex street
- Kármán–Howarth equation
- Källén–Lehmann spectral representation
- Köhler theory
- König's theorem (kinetics)
- Küssner effect
