= KMQ =

KMQ may refer to:

- Komatsu Airport, an airport in the city of Komatsu, Japan
- KMQ viewer, glasses for viewing a stereoscopic over/under format
