= Van Hare Effect =

Depth viewing technique

The Van Hare Effect is a 3D stereoscopic viewing technique for creating or enhancing the illusion of depth in an image by means of stereopsis for binocular vision using psychophysical percepts. The Van Hare Effect creates the illusion of dimensionality, rather than actual dimensionality in the subject being viewed. The Van Hare Effect is achieved by employing the stereoscopic cross-eyed viewing technique on a pair of identical images placed side-by-side. In doing so, it artificially tricks the human brain and optical center into seeing depth in what is actually a two-dimensional, non-stereoscopic image. The illusion of depth is interesting in that even if the image pair is not itself originally stereoscopic, the brain perceives it as if it is.

No special viewing apparatus is required as the brain is tricked into creating a false perception of a three-dimensional still image or video simply by viewing it with the cross-eyed technique. In videos or films viewed this way, the artificial depth perception derived can to be diminished for some viewers, perhaps due to the fast changing visual picture, which appears to occupy more of the brain.

Most people can employ the Van Hare Effect but not all. The reasons for why some people cannot make the Van Hare Effect work for them are unknown and deserve further scientific study.

== Background ==
The Van Hare Effect was discovered in 2003 by the 3D theorist, Thomas Van Hare, who also invented three additional fields in stereoscopy -- hyperdimensionality, variable dimensionality, and computational dimensionality, a.k.a. C3D, which were all developed for military applications with the intended purpose of creating stereoscopic output from single camera drones for improved interpretation of reconnaissance imagery and capture.

Why the Van Hare Effect works remains a matter of conjecture, although it is clearly the brain itself that creates the impression of depth perception even where there is none in the image pair being viewed. The brain appears to be "trained" to view images in 3D as a general rule, even when very limited or no stereoscopic data is available. Thus, the Van Hare Effect creates the artificial impression of 3D viewing based on the brain's own past experience in interpreting objects, shapes and people, drawing on past visual experiences and knowledge of the perception of similar forms. The cross-eyed viewing technique may be the cue that allows the brain to override its assumption that the photograph or video/film being viewed is two-dimensional and instead trick it into thinking that the results are supposed to be three-dimensional. Therefore, once the brain is tricked in this manner, it may be that it works more effectively in discerning the depth and dimensional data from the existing two-dimensional images, thus giving the viewer the impression of dimensionality even where there is none.

The Pulfrich effect may likewise be partly explained in this manner, though the actual temporal changes from frame to frame in the films prepared for viewing with the Pulfrich effect do in fact provide some dimensional information to the brain. However, even where no temporal changes are evident in objects in the films being viewed with the Pulfrich effect, the brain appears to apply some depth perception to those areas of the film anyway, as if artificially compensating in a manner that inserts dimensional data where no stereoscopic-like changes are actually available. This may be related to the same processes in the brain that produce the Van Hare Effect.

The Van Hare Effect may also result partly from the brain's ability to discern dimensional information from changes in the size of objects or in the varying definition of textures within the image due to changes in resolution at a distance. It may also result from the amount of haze evident in the picture, which increases in distance and, in color images, may be perceived as a matter of color saturation or by a subtle shift toward the blue end of the spectrum. Additionally, some artificial depth perception may result from the perception of the amount of overlap seen in objects or the appearance of objects that are known to be the same size, that repeat in the image at various sizes, due to the distances involved. All of these latter reasons, however, should allow depth perception to be just as evident in a single two-dimensional image, yet typically they appear to escape notice when the viewer is examining a single image. It may be that once the Van Hare Effect is applied, these clues within the images are more easily recognized and discerned by the brain and optic center.

The Van Hare Effect may also be more readily apparent or magnified to those who have used the cross-eyed viewing technique in the past. If the viewer is accustomed to looking at stereoscopic image pairs without a viewer and by using the cross-eyed viewing technique, the viewer may have further trained their brain in a manner that enhances the Van Hare Effect. The knowledge of visual interpretation from the cross-eyed technique then is more readily applied when viewing identical image pairs instead of stereoscopic image pairs.

== Technique ==
A regular, two-dimensional image is all that is needed. The viewer prepares two prints of the identical image and these are placed side-by-side, horizontally, and close together. The pair of identical images are then viewed with the cross-eyed viewing method, the same as one would use in interpreting stereoscopic image pairs. The cross-eyed viewing method has its roots in aerial photography and aerial reconnaissance image interpretation.

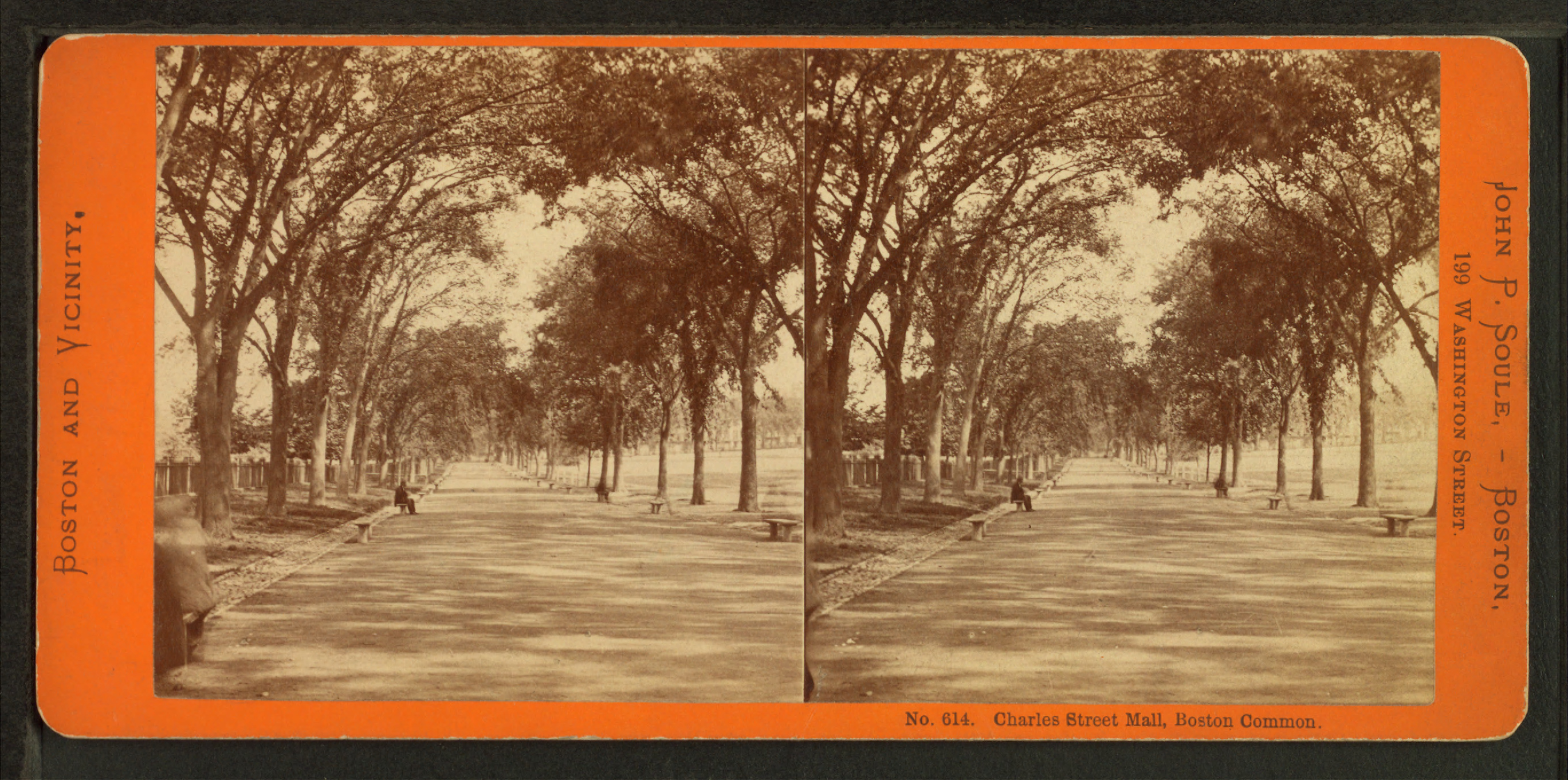
View of Boston, c. 1860; an early stereoscopic card for viewing a scene from nature, where actual stereoscopic image data is included.

No special glasses, filters, colored lens or other apparatus are required to employ the Van Hare Effect. Simply by utilizing the cross-eyed viewing technique, the resulting pair of identical images are seen in three-dimensions, even if there are no stereoscopic differences based on the interstitial distance included in the image being viewed.

The cross-eyed viewing method, in traditional stereoscopy, swaps the left and right eye images so that they will be correctly seen cross-eyed, the left eye viewing the image on the right and vice versa. A fused three-dimensional image thus appears to the eye, though it also appears to be smaller and closer than the actual images, so that large objects and scenes appear miniaturized.

For videos with the artificial depth implied by the Van Hare Effect, the viewer plays the same video side-by-side, as above, and views it with the cross-eyed viewing technique.

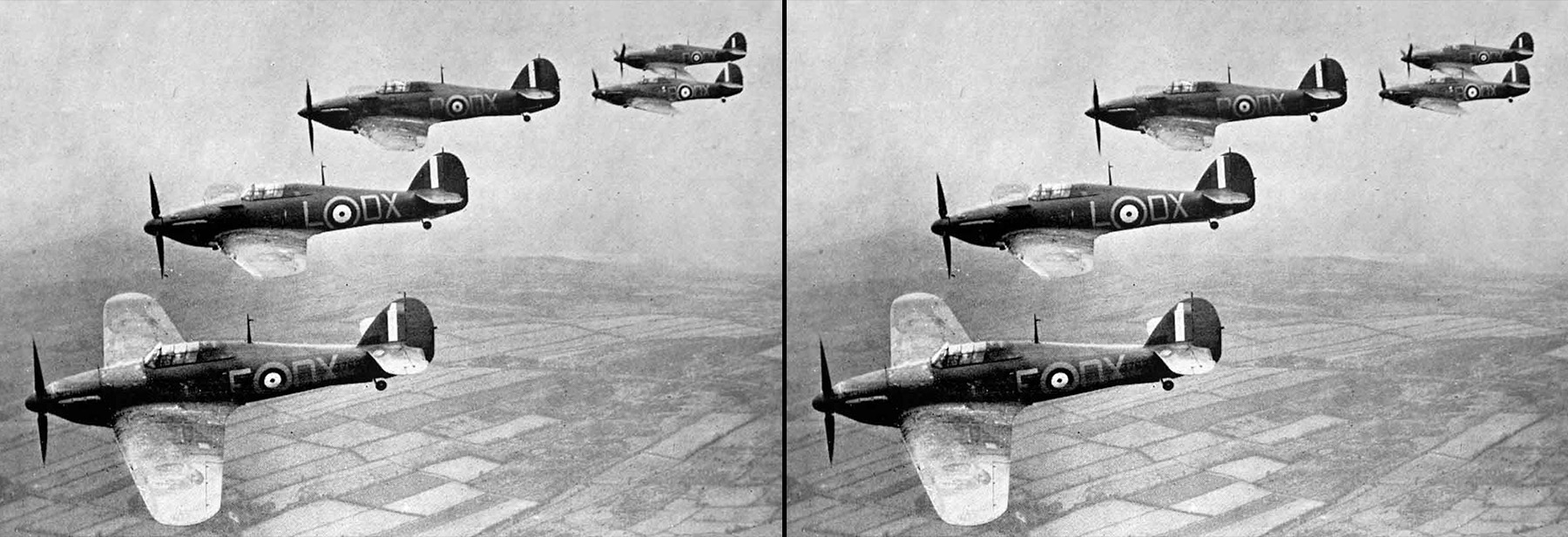
Two identical images of a historic photo of a flight of RAF Hawker Hurricanes are placed side-by-side to demonstrate the Van Hare Effect, where a 2D image can be artificially perceived as if it is stereoscopic.

As an aid for those wishing to learn how to use the cross-eyed viewing method and thereby create image pair fusion, a fingertip can be placed just below the division between the two images, then slowly brought straight toward the viewer's eyes, keeping the eyes directed at the fingertip; at a certain distance, a fused three-dimensional image should seem to be hovering just above the finger.

A second aid, alternatively, involves using a piece of paper with a small opening cut into it. This can be used in a similar manner so that when the paper is correctly positioned between the image pair and the viewer's eyes, which can be achieved by moving the paper forward and backward until the two images come into full view, whereupon the hole in the paper will seem to frame a small three-dimensional image.

A third aid is that the viewer goes cross-eyed, and when this is done, the two images appear as three images, due to the lines of sight when cross-eyed. If the viewer focuses on the middle of the three images, it will come into focus as stereoscopic, without any viewing apparatus or use of a finger to get the eyes correctly focused.

== Notable uses ==
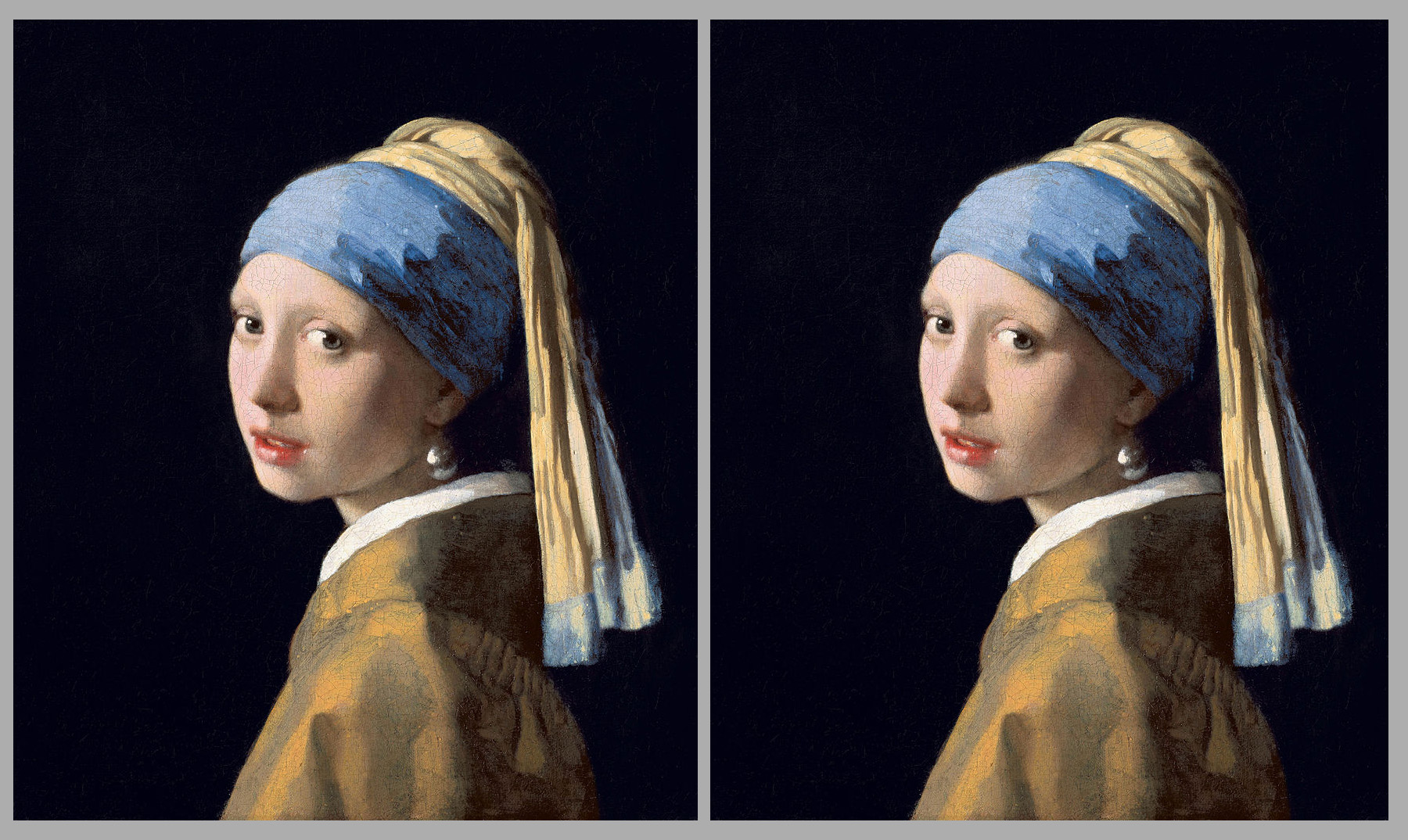
Two identical images of the famous Vermeer painting, Girl with a Pearl Earring, painted c. 1665, are placed side-by-side to demonstrate the Van Hare Effect and how it can be used to reinterpret artworks. The 2D painting can be artificially perceived as if it is stereoscopic, giving artificial depth. In this case, a dimensional mistake is uncovered -- the girl's neck is not properly painted in the correct position for artificial depth. This is an error in the original painting that heretofore typically escapes notice when seen by a common viewer's eye. Once the error is recognized through application of the Van Hare Effect, it becomes easily recognized even when viewing normally as a single image.

Beyond creating an artificial 3D effect from regular photographs, there are other uses for the Van Hare Effect, including the following:

Converting 2D Images to 3D -- This is the original intent of the Van Hare Effect. Images that are 2D can be viewed in artificial 3D, often resulting in features that escaped notice becoming apparent to the viewer as the brain provides dimensional interpretation to what was heretofore a two-dimensional image.

Finding Hidden Objects -- The Van Hare Effect provides viewers with a fast and easy way to find hidden objects, such as in "hidden object games", where two images are presented side-by-side and the viewer is challenged to find the missing items or changes from one image to the next. By employing cross-eyed viewing and the Van Hare Effect, the changes are instantly evident, either appearing as throbbing differences or standing out as if hovering over the top of the image when viewed in this manner.

Easily Recognizing Image Edits -- Where an original image and an edited image are both in hand, the Van Hare Effect provides a way to spot the edits that have been made simply by comparing the original and the edited image side-by-side with the cross-eyed viewing. The image edits are instantly evident, typically as throbbing or highlighted areas in the combined "middle" image.

Seeing Artworks in 3D -- Painting and flat image artworks of most types can be seen as if in artificial 3D, even if the artist did not paint any significant clues as to the dimensions of the subjects. Using the Van Hare Effect, the human brain simply fills in an artificial dimensional depth in the painting, even if it is not there, thus allowing the user to appreciate the artwork in a new way.

Uncovering Image of Video Manipulation -- Often, when an image or video has been manipulated, retouched, or edited, the changes are not readily apparent to the viewer. However, when the image or video is viewed while employing the Van Hare Effect—even without having the original unedited image—some of the manipulations may become obvious to the viewer and recognizable as changes to the original image because the person manipulating, retouching, or editing the image or video did so on the two-dimensional image or video only and, as a result, made errors that are apparent from the artificial depth effect created when applying the Van Hare Effect.
