= Stereoscopy =

Technique for creating or enhancing the impression of depth in an image

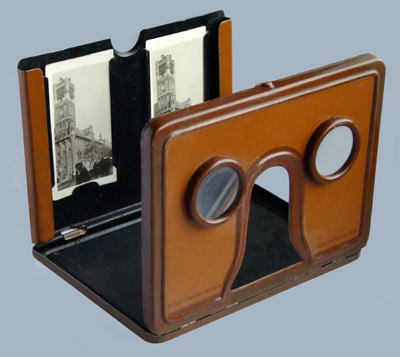
Stereoscopy with a binocular stereoscope, showing the two lenses a person looks through to see a 3D image formed behind them

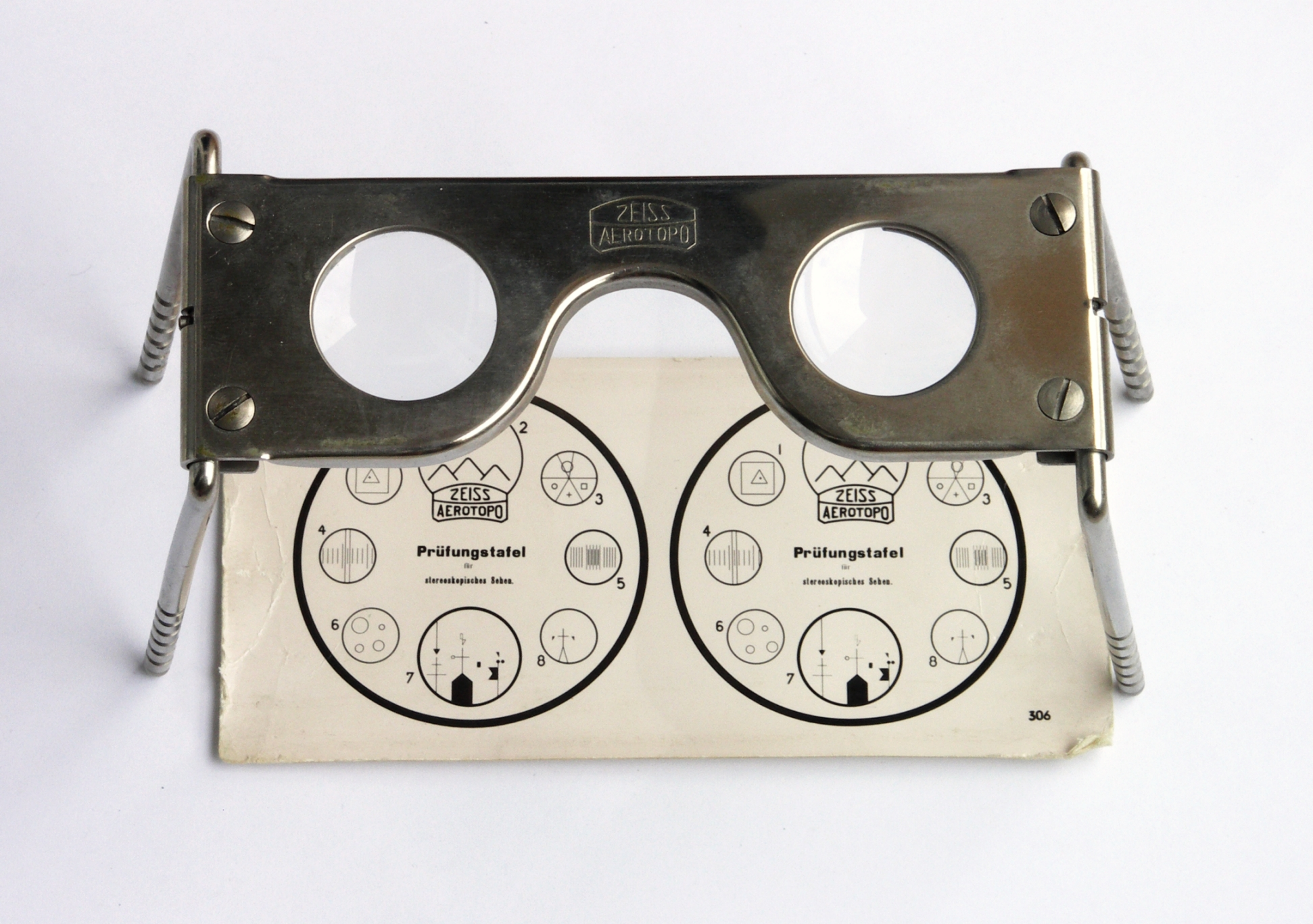
Pocket stereoscope with original test image. Used by military to examine stereoscopic pairs of aerial photographs.

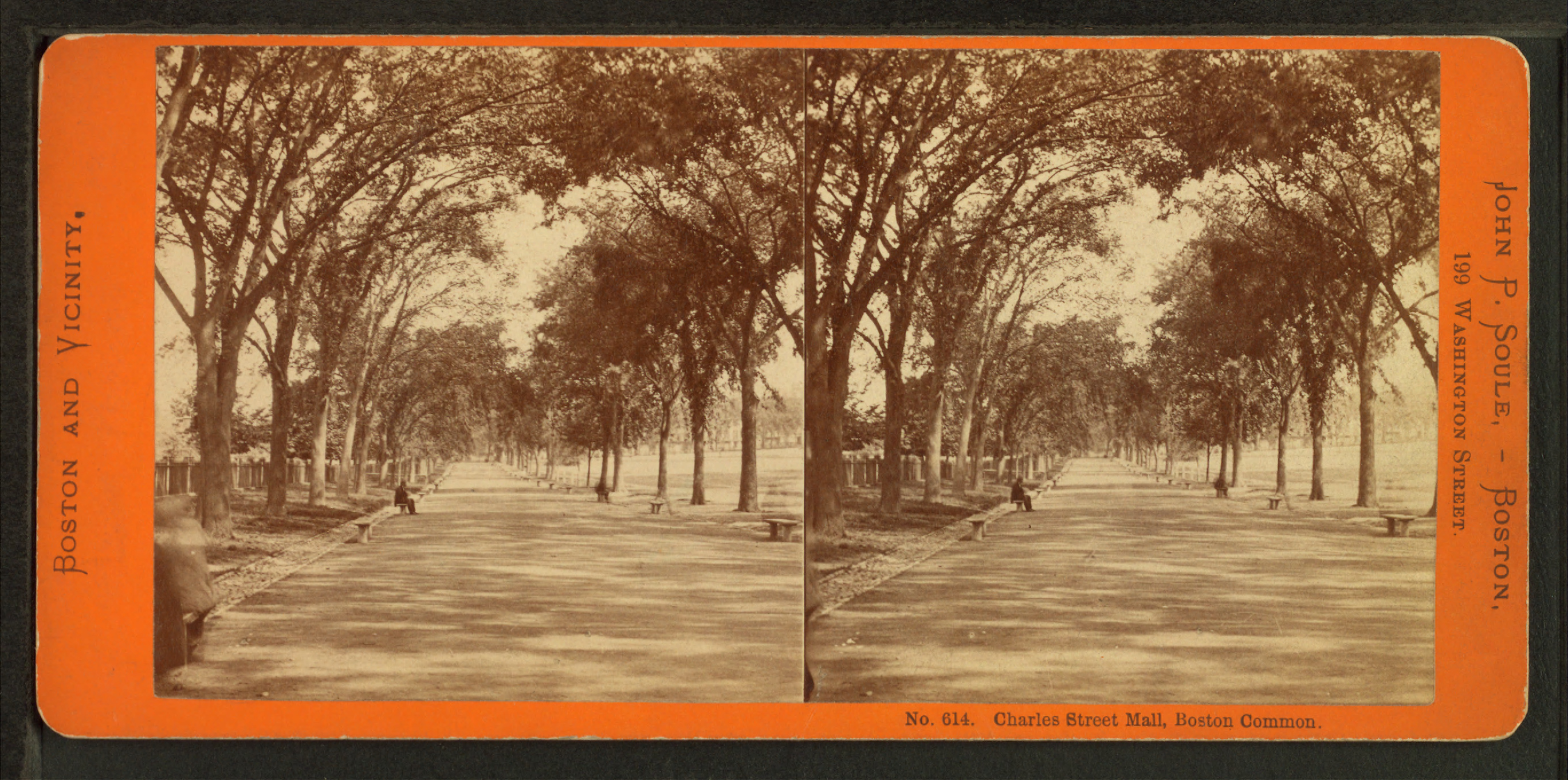
View of Boston, c. 1860; an early stereoscopic card for viewing a scene from nature

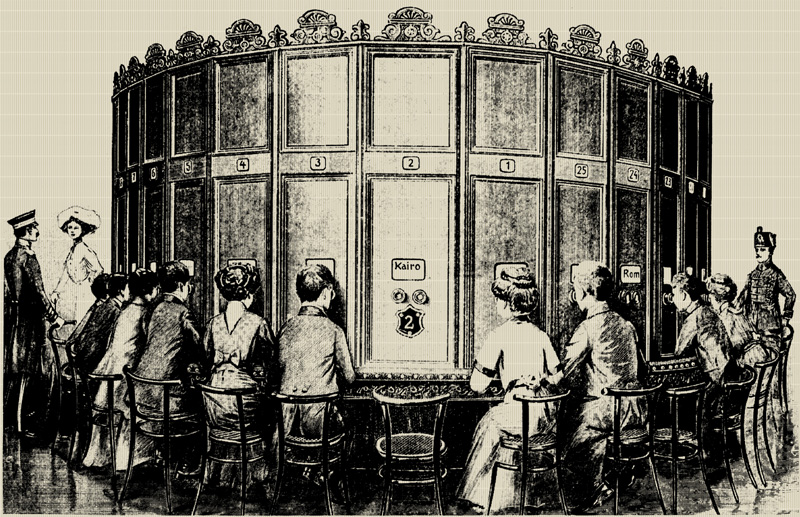
Kaiserpanorama consists of a multi-station viewing apparatus and sets of stereo slides. Patented by A. Fuhrmann around 1890.

Stereoscopy, also called stereoscopics or stereo imaging, refers to making images appear three-dimensional. The most popular kind of stereoscopy is two-view stereoscopy, which causes partial stereopsis in an image from a set of two two-dimensional images by using binocular disparity. The word stereoscopy derives from Ancient Greek στερεός (stereós) 'firm, solid' and σκοπέω (skopéō) 'to look, to see'. A stereoscopic image is called a stereogram. Originally, stereogram referred to a pair of two-dimensional images that could be viewed using a stereoscope.

Most stereoscopic methods present a pair of two-dimensional images to the viewer. The left image is presented to the left eye and the right image is presented to the right eye. When viewed, the human brain perceives the images as a single 3D view, giving the viewer the perception of 3D depth. However, the 3D effect lacks proper focal depth, which gives rise to the vergence-accommodation conflict.

== Background ==
Stereoscopy creates the impression of three-dimensional depth. The most popular type of stereoscopy, two-view stereoscopy, creates the impression from a pair of two-dimensional images. Human vision, including the perception of depth, is a complex process, which only begins with the acquisition of visual information taken in through the eyes; much processing happens in the brain, as it strives to make sense of the raw information. One of the functions that occur within the brain as it interprets what the eyes see is assessing the relative distances of objects from the viewer, and the depth dimension of those objects. The cues that the brain uses to gauge relative distances and depth in a perceived scene include:

- Binocular disparity - The differences in images in each eye caused by the horizontal distance between the two eyes
- Vergence
- Accommodation
- Occlusion (the overlapping of one object by another)
- Subtended visual angle of an object of known size
- Linear perspective (convergence of parallel edges)
- Vertical position (objects closer to the horizon in the scene tend to be perceived as farther away)
- Haze or contrast, saturation, and color, greater distance generally being associated with greater haze, desaturation, and a shift toward blue
- Change in size of textured pattern detail

(All but the first three of the above cues exist in traditional two-dimensional images, such as paintings, photographs, and television.)

Two-view stereoscopy is the production of the impression of depth in a photograph, movie, or other image by the presentation of a slightly different image to each eye, also known as stereopsis from binocular disparity. The two images are combined in the brain to give the perception of stereopsis. However, because all points in the image produced by stereoscopy from binocular disparity focus at the same plane regardless of their depth in the original scene, the third cue, focus, also known as accommodation, is not replicated and therefore the appearance of depth is incomplete.

There are two main elements of stereopsis from binocular disparity that are unnatural for human vision: (1) the mismatch between convergence and accommodation, caused by the difference between objects' perceived position in front of or behind the display or screen and the real origin of that light; and (2) possible crosstalk between the eyes, caused by imperfect image separation in some methods of binocular fixed-focus stereoscopy. The presentation of dual 2D images is distinctly different from displaying an image in three full dimensions by using a volumetric display, or recreating a light field.

Most 3D displays use the two-view stereoscopic method to convey images. The method was first invented by Sir Charles Wheatstone in 1838, and improved by Sir David Brewster who made the first portable 3D viewing device.

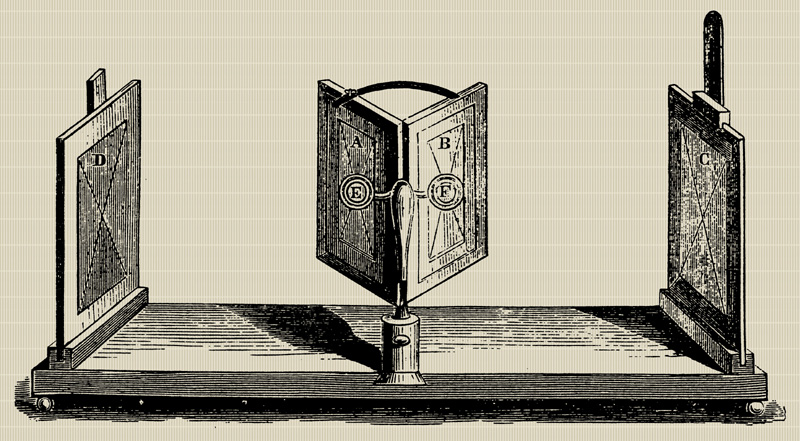
Wheatstone mirror stereoscope

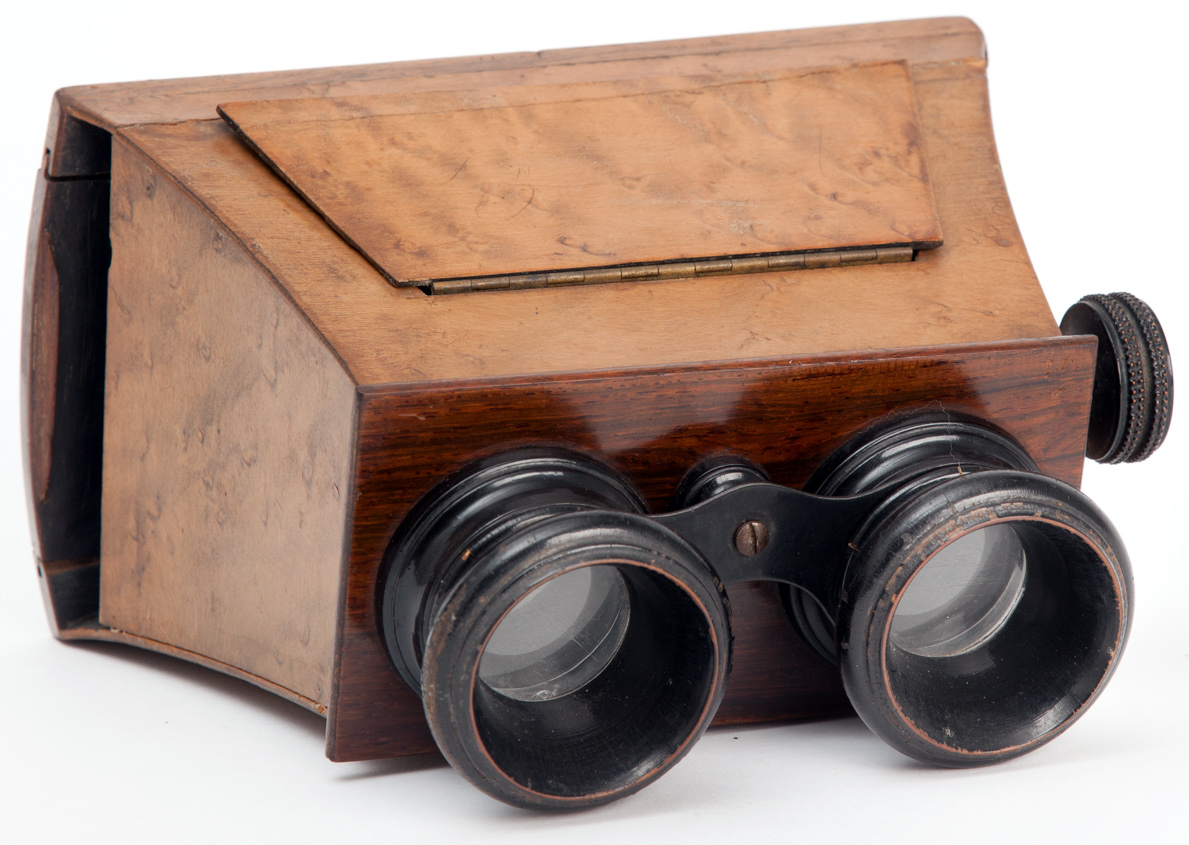
Brewster-type stereoscope, 1870

Wheatstone originally used his stereoscope (a rather bulky device) with drawings because photography was not yet available, yet his original paper seems to foresee the development of a realistic imaging method:

For the purposes of illustration I have employed only outline figures, for had either shading or colouring been introduced it might be supposed that the effect was wholly or in part due to these circumstances, whereas by leaving them out of consideration no room is left to doubt that the entire effect of relief is owing to the simultaneous perception of the two monocular projections, one on each retina. But if it be required to obtain the most faithful resemblances of real objects, shadowing and colouring may properly be employed to heighten the effects. Careful attention would enable an artist to draw and paint the two component pictures, so as to present to the mind of the observer, in the resultant perception, perfect identity with the object represented. Flowers, crystals, busts, vases, instruments of various kinds, &c., might thus be represented so as not to be distinguished by sight from the real objects themselves.

Stereoscopy is used in photogrammetry and also for entertainment through the production of stereograms. Stereoscopy is useful in viewing images rendered from large multi-dimensional data sets such as are produced by experimental data. Modern industrial three-dimensional photography may use 3D scanners to detect and record three-dimensional information. The three-dimensional depth information can be reconstructed from two images using a computer by correlating the pixels in the left and right images. Solving the Correspondence problem in the field of Computer Vision aims to create meaningful depth information from two images.

=== Visual requirements ===
There are 3 components of binocular vision involved in viewing two-view stereo images:

1. Simultaneous perception
2. Fusion (binocular 'single' vision)
3. Stereopsis

These functions develop in early childhood. Some people who have strabismus disrupt the development of stereopsis, however orthoptics treatment can be used to improve binocular vision. A person's stereoacuity determines the minimum image disparity they can perceive as depth. It is believed that approximately 12% of people are unable to properly see 3D images, due to a variety of medical conditions. According to another experiment up to 30% of people have very weak stereoscopic vision preventing them from depth perception based on stereo disparity. This nullifies or greatly decreases immersion effects of stereo to them.

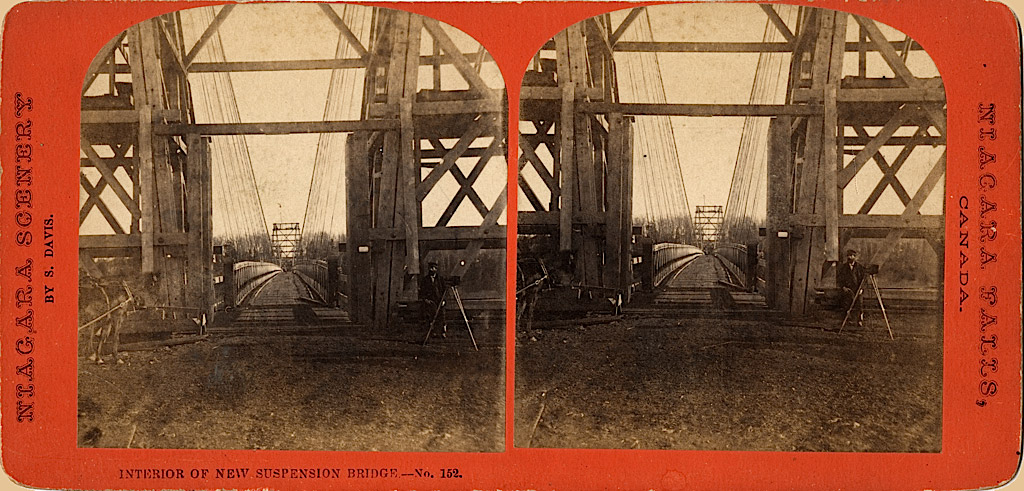
Saul Davis (act. 1860s–1870s), New Suspension Bridge, Niagara Falls, Canada, c. 1869, albumen print stereograph, Department of Image Collections, National Gallery of Art Library, Washington, DC

Stereoscopic viewing may be artificially created by the viewer's brain, as demonstrated with the Van Hare Effect, where the brain perceives stereo images even when the paired photographs are identical. This "false dimensionality" results from the developed stereoacuity in the brain, allowing the viewer to fill in depth information even when few if any 3D cues are actually available in the paired images.

== Side-by-side ==
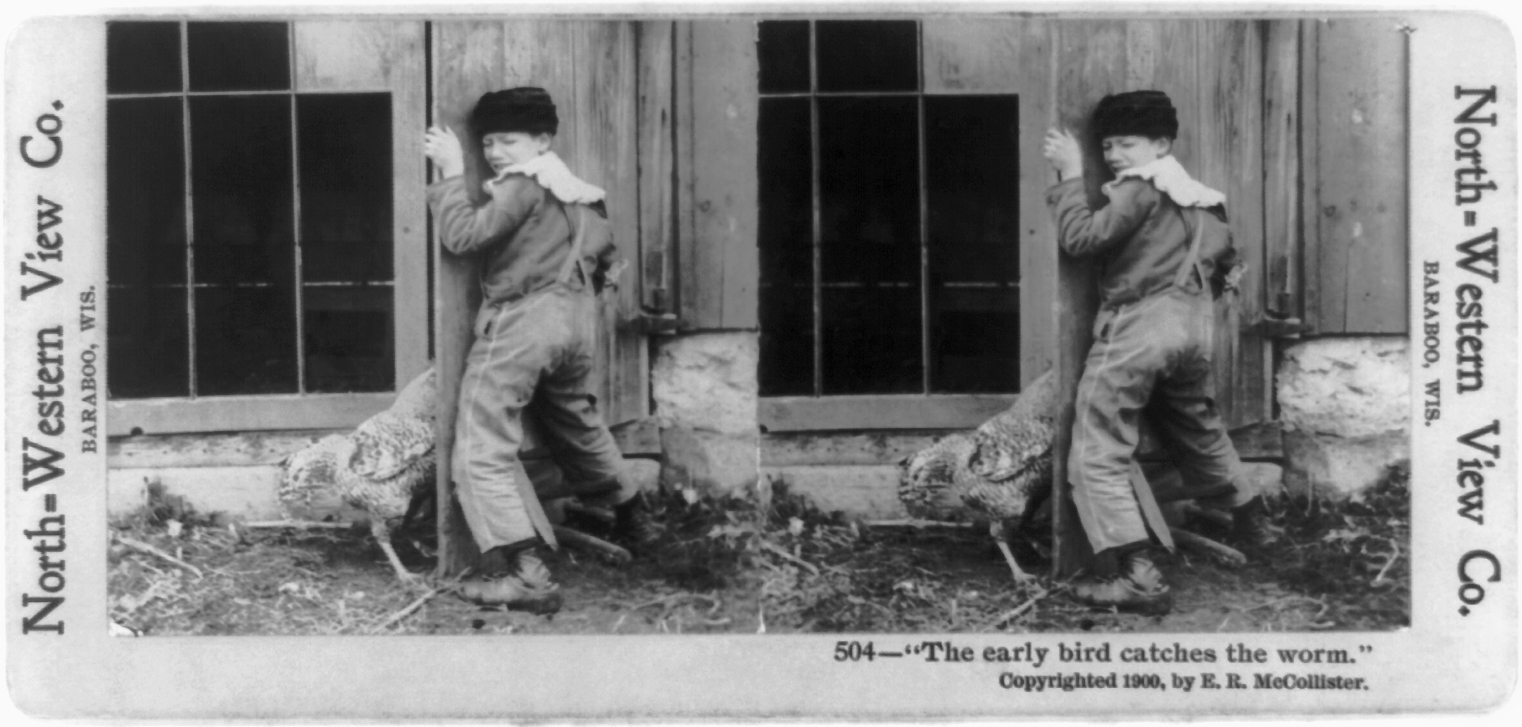
"The early bird catches the worm" stereograph published in 1900 by North-Western View Co. of Baraboo, Wisconsin, digitally restored

Traditional stereoscopic photography consists of creating a binocular stereogram, which can show a 3D effect starting from a pair of 2D images. The easiest way to trigger stereopsis is to provide the eyes of the viewer with two different images, representing two perspectives of the same object, with a minor deviation equal or nearly equal to the perspectives that both eyes naturally receive in binocular vision. This is known as binocular disparity.

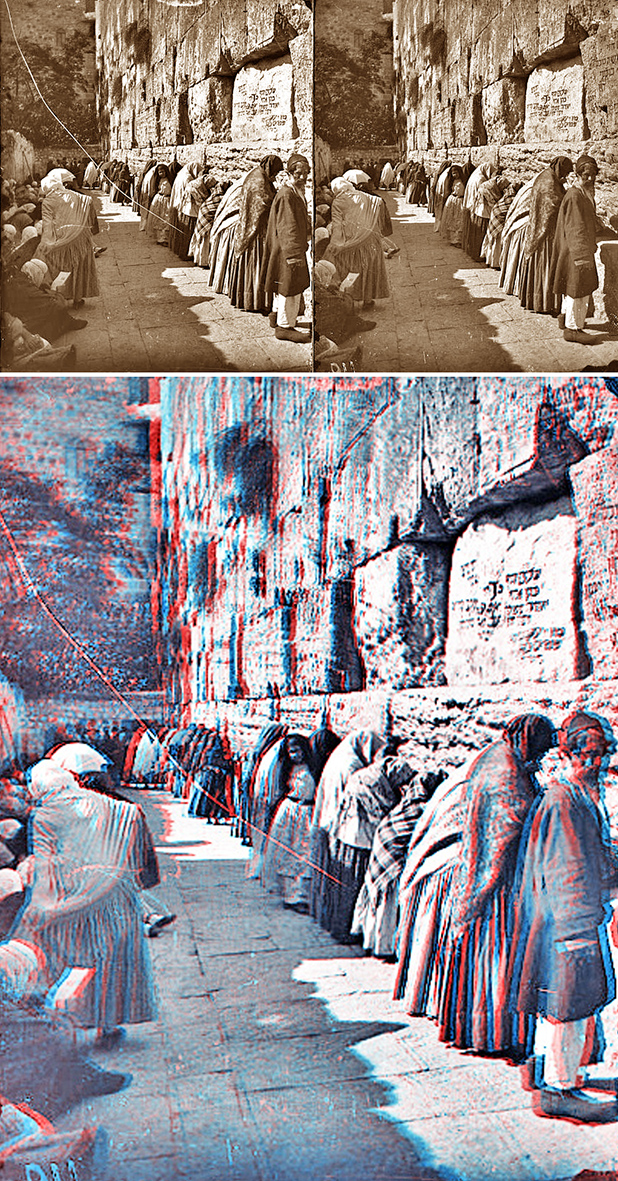
A stereoscopic pair of images (top) and a combined anaglyph that colors one perspective red and the other cyan. 3D red cyan glasses are recommended to view this image correctly.

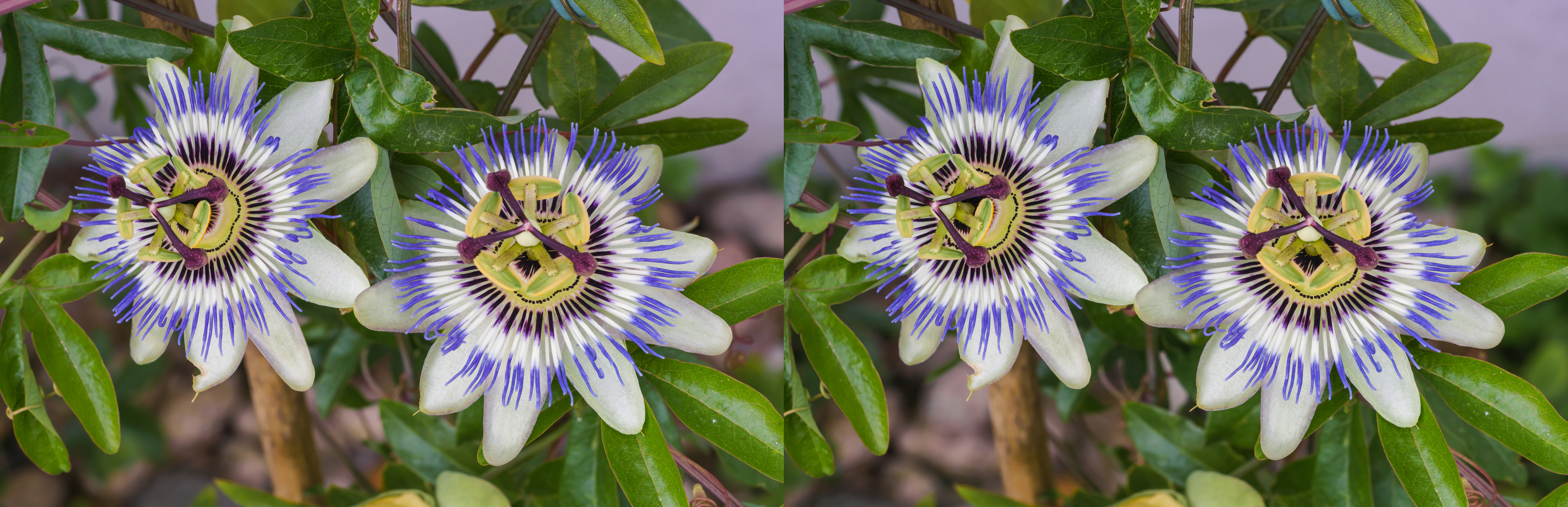
Two Passiflora caerulea flowers arranged as a stereo image pair for viewing by the cross-eyed viewing method (see Freeviewing)

To avoid eyestrain and distortion, each of the two 2D images should be presented to the viewer so that any object at infinite distance is perceived by the eye as being straight ahead, the viewer's eyes being neither crossed nor diverging. When the picture contains no object at infinite distance, such as a horizon or a cloud, the pictures should be spaced correspondingly closer together.

The advantages of side-by-side viewers is the lack of diminution of brightness, allowing the presentation of images at very high resolution and in full spectrum color, simplicity in creation, and little or no additional image processing is required. Under some circumstances, such as when a pair of images is presented for freeviewing, no device or additional optical equipment is needed.

The principal disadvantage of side-by-side viewers is that large image displays are not practical and resolution is limited by the lesser of the display medium or human eye. This is because as the dimensions of an image are increased, either the viewing apparatus or viewer themselves must move proportionately further away from it in order to view it comfortably. Moving closer to an image in order to see more detail would only be possible with viewing equipment that adjusted to the difference.

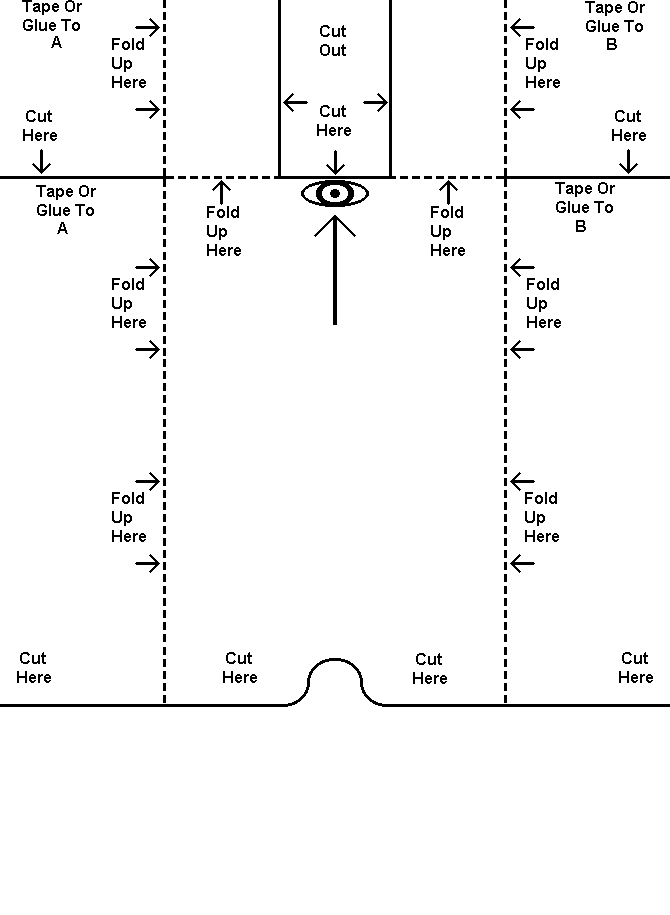
Printable cross eye viewer

=== Freeviewing ===
Freeviewing is viewing a side-by-side image pair without using a viewing device.

Two methods are available to freeview: parallel viewing and cross-eyed viewing.

- The parallel viewing method uses an image pair with the left-eye image on the left and the right-eye image on the right. The fused three-dimensional image appears larger and more distant than the two actual images, making it possible to convincingly simulate a life-size scene. The viewer attempts to look through the images with the eyes substantially parallel, as if looking at the actual scene. This can be difficult with normal vision because eye focus and binocular convergence are habitually coordinated. One approach to decoupling the two functions is to view the image pair extremely close up with completely relaxed eyes, making no attempt to focus clearly but simply achieving comfortable stereoscopic fusion of the two blurry images by the "look-through" approach, and only then exerting the effort to focus them more clearly, increasing the viewing distance as necessary. Regardless of the approach used or the image medium, for comfortable viewing and stereoscopic accuracy the size and spacing of the images should be such that the corresponding points of very distant objects in the scene are separated by the same distance as the viewer's eyes, but not more; the average interocular distance is about 63 mm. Viewing much more widely separated images is possible, but because the eyes never diverge in normal use it usually requires some previous training and tends to cause eye strain.
- The cross-eyed viewing method swaps the left and right eye images so that they will be correctly seen cross-eyed, the left eye viewing the image on the right and vice versa. The fused three-dimensional image appears to be smaller and closer than the actual images, so that large objects and scenes appear miniaturized. This method is usually easier for freeviewing novices. As an aid to fusion, a fingertip can be placed just below the division between the two images, then slowly brought straight toward the viewer's eyes, keeping the eyes directed at the fingertip; at a certain distance, a fused three-dimensional image should seem to be hovering just above the finger. Alternatively, a piece of paper with a small opening cut into it can be used in a similar manner; when correctly positioned between the image pair and the viewer's eyes, it will seem to frame a small three-dimensional image.

Prismatic, self-masking glasses are now being used by some cross-eyed-view advocates. These reduce the degree of convergence required and allow large images to be displayed. However, any viewing aid that uses prisms, mirrors or lenses to assist fusion or focus is simply a type of stereoscope, excluded by the customary definition of freeviewing.

Stereoscopically fusing two separate images without the aid of mirrors or prisms while simultaneously keeping them in sharp focus without the aid of suitable viewing lenses inevitably requires an unnatural combination of eye vergence and accommodation. Simple freeviewing therefore cannot accurately reproduce the physiological depth cues of the real-world viewing experience. Different individuals may experience differing degrees of ease and comfort in achieving fusion and good focus, as well as differing tendencies to eye fatigue or strain.

==== Autostereogram ====
An autostereogram is a single-image stereogram (SIS) designed to create a three-dimensional (3D) effect within the human brain from an external two-dimensional image. In order to perceive 3D shapes in these autostereograms, one must overcome the normally automatic coordination between focusing and vergence.

==== Contrast-based stereoscopy ====
Contrast-based stereoscopy is a method of partially replicating the effect of a binocular stereogram, using only a single two-dimensional image, through the use of color contrast. Creating a stereoscopic image using this method requires the use of two monochromatic, partially transparent images (one of a brighter color compared to the other), overlaid atop one another. While this method does not require the manipulation of one's vergence, it can only create the appearance of depth from a specific viewing angle, and cannot simulate an entire three-dimensional scene as an autostereogram would.

=== Stereoscope and stereographic cards ===
Stereoscopes are viewing devices in which two photographs of the same object, taken from slightly different angles, are simultaneously presented, one to each eye. A simple stereoscope is limited in the size of the image that may be used. A more complex stereoscope uses a pair of horizontal periscope-like devices, allowing the use of larger images that can present more detailed information in a wider field of view. One can buy historical stereoscopes such as Holmes stereoscopes as antiques.

A stereographic card consists of two nearly identical photographs or prints on paper, mounted side by side onto a rigid card backing. However, they may also take the form of daguerreotypes, glass plate negatives, or other processes. The stereograph card backings can be brightly coloured with decorative printing and/ or flourished borders, or they can be drab, plain, and strictly utilitarian in appearance. The coloured mounts are generally uniform in colour, having the same colour present on both sides of the card; however, they can also be multi-coloured, where one colour is present on the top side, and another colour is present on the reverse. Brightly coloured stereographic card mounts produced in the 19th century may contain toxic pigments such as Emerald Green or Paris Green.

=== Transparency viewers ===
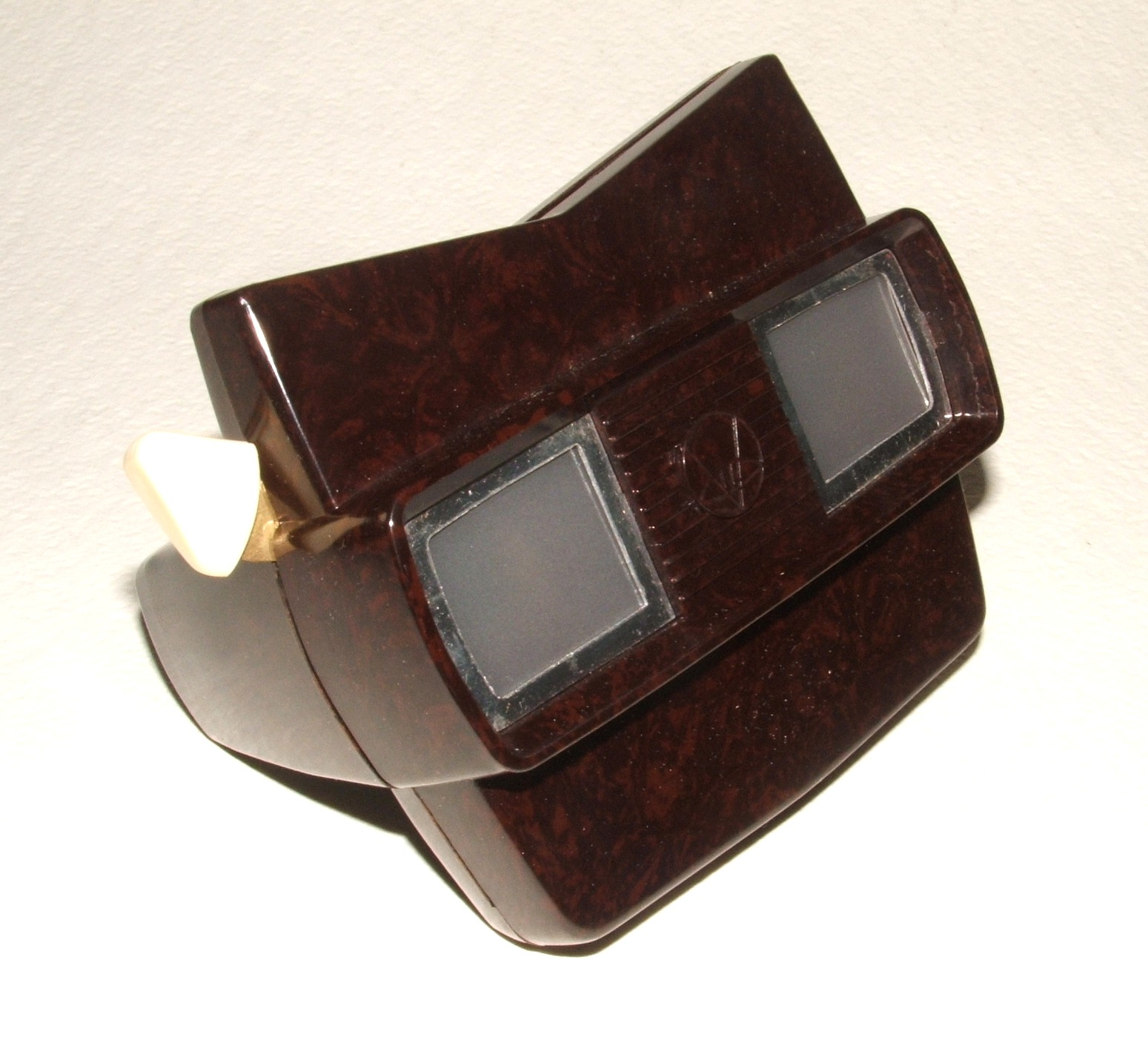
A View-Master Model E of the 1950s

Some stereoscopes are designed for viewing transparent photographs on film or glass, known as transparencies or diapositives and commonly called slides. Some of the earliest stereoscope views, issued in the 1850s, were on glass. In the early 20th century, 45x107 mm and 6x13 cm glass slides were common formats for amateur stereo photography, especially in Europe. In later years, several film-based formats were in use. The best-known formats for commercially issued stereo views on film are Tru-Vue, introduced in 1931, and View-Master, introduced in 1939 and still in production. For amateur stereo slides, the Stereo Realist format, introduced in 1947, is by far the most common.

=== Head-mounted displays ===
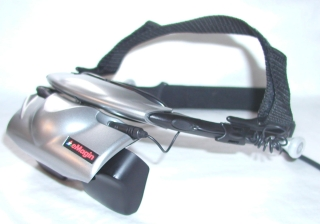
An HMD with a separate video source displayed in front of each eye to achieve a stereoscopic effect

A head-mounted display (HMD) is an electronic display that is worn on the head and often can show two-view fixed-focus stereoscopic imagery. The user typically wears a helmet or glasses with two small LCD or OLED displays with magnifying lenses, one for each eye. A HMD can be used to show stereoscopic films, images, or games, and it can also be used to create a virtual computer monitor.

Head-mounted displays may be coupled with head-tracking devices, allowing the user to navigate a virtual environment in three degrees of rotation or six degrees of freedom, in virtual reality and augmented reality. Performing the motion update quickly enough to avoid inducing nausea in the user requires a great amount of computer image processing. If six axis position sensing (direction and position) is used then wearer may move about within the limitations of the equipment used. Owing to rapid advancements in computer graphics and the continuing miniaturization of video and other equipment these devices are beginning to become available at more reasonable cost.

Head-mounted or wearable glasses may be used to view a see-through image imposed upon the real world view, creating augmented reality. In some consumer devices, this is done by reflecting the displays through partially transparent mirrors in front of the eyes. The real world view is seen through the mirrors' surface, with the virtual content also visible.

Augmented stereoscopic vision is also expected to have applications in surgery, as it allows the combination of radiographic data (CAT scans and MRI imaging) with the surgeon's vision.

== 3D viewers ==
There are two categories of 3D viewer technology, active and passive. Active viewers have electronics which interact with a display. Passive viewers filter constant streams of binocular input to the appropriate eye.

=== Active ===
==== Shutter systems ====
Functional principle of active shutter 3D systems

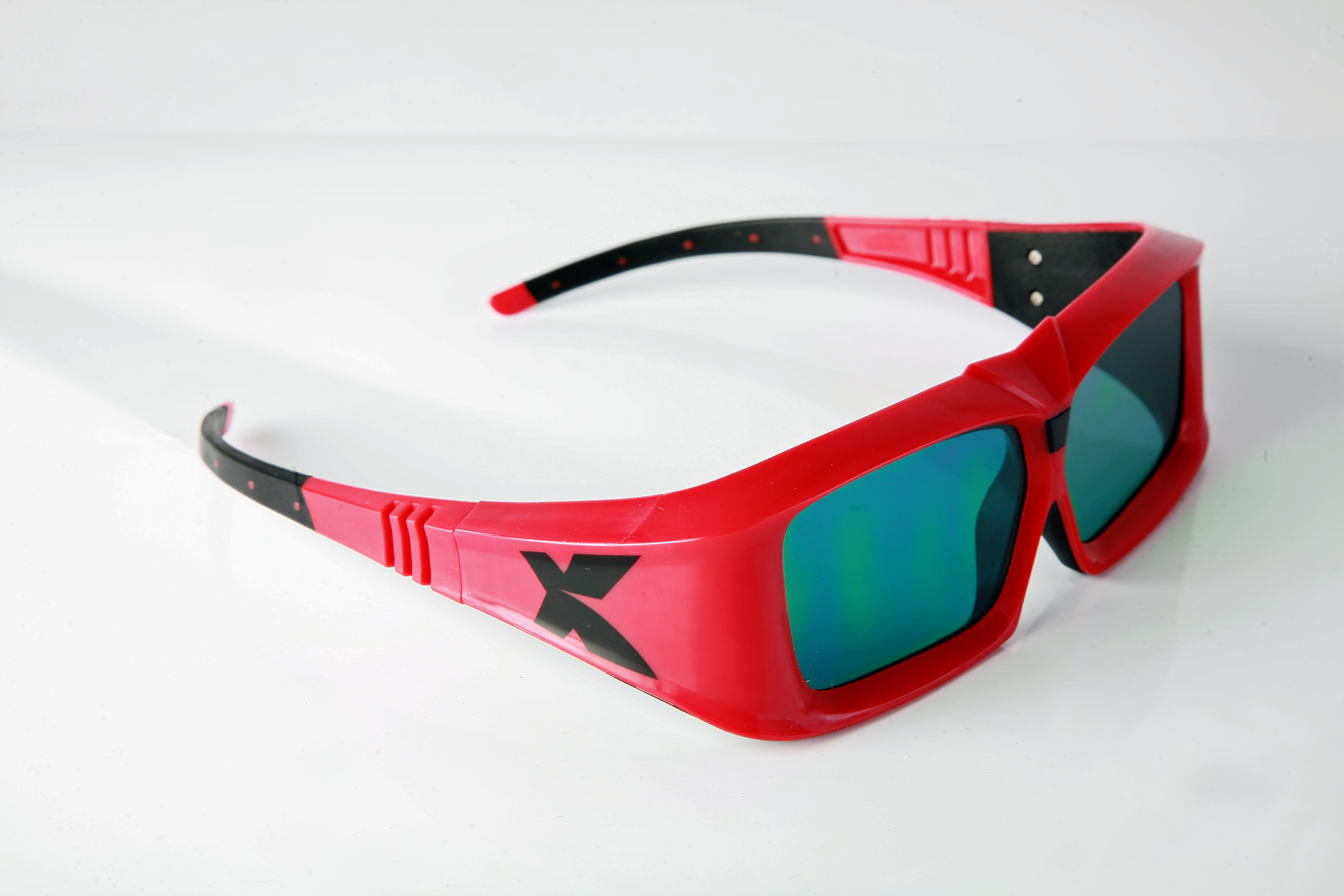
A pair of LC shutter glasses used to view XpanD 3D films. The thick frames conceal the electronics and batteries.

A shutter system works by openly presenting the image intended for the left eye while blocking the right eye's view, then presenting the right-eye image while blocking the left eye, and repeating this so rapidly that the interruptions do not interfere with the perceived fusion of the two images into a single 3D image. It generally uses liquid crystal shutter glasses. Each eye's glass contains a liquid crystal layer which has the property of becoming dark when voltage is applied, being otherwise transparent. The glasses are controlled by a timing signal that allows the glasses to alternately darken over one eye, and then the other, in synchronization with the refresh rate of the screen. The main drawback of active shutters is that most 3D videos and movies were shot with simultaneous left and right views, so that it introduces a "time parallax" for anything side-moving: for instance, someone walking at 3.4 mph will be seen 20% too close or 25% too remote in the most current case of a 2x60 Hz projection.

=== Passive ===
==== Polarization systems ====
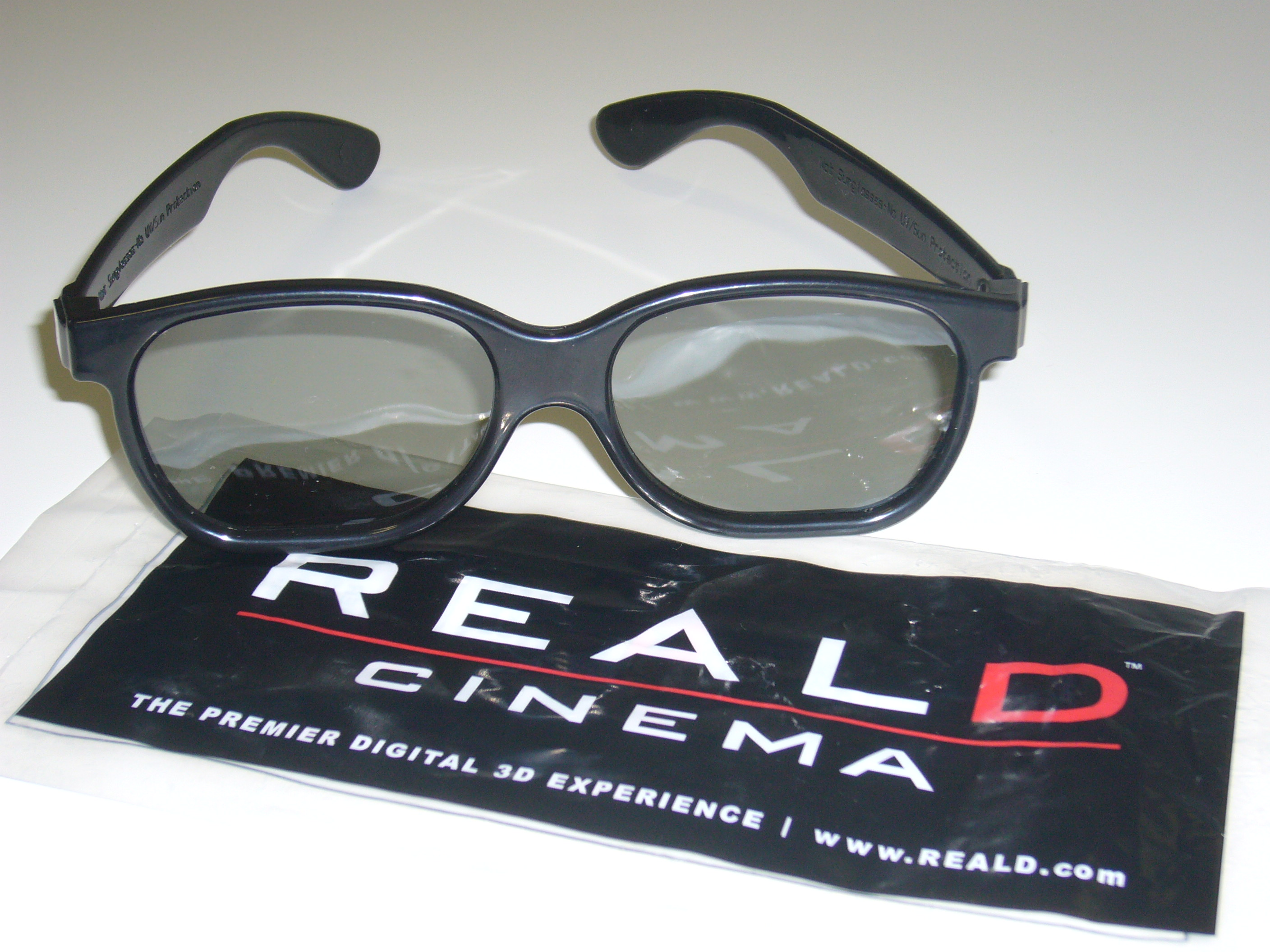
RealD circular polarized glasses

To present stereoscopic motion pictures, two images are projected superimposed onto the same screen through polarizing filters or presented on a display with polarized filters. For projection, a silver screen is used so that polarization is preserved. On most passive displays every other row of pixels is polarized for one eye or the other. This method is also known as being interlaced. The viewer wears low-cost eyeglasses which also contain a pair of opposite polarizing filters. As each filter only passes light which is similarly polarized and blocks the opposite polarized light, each eye only sees one of the images, and the effect is achieved.

==== Interference filter systems ====
This technique uses specific wavelengths of red, green, and blue for the right eye, and different wavelengths of red, green, and blue for the left eye. Eyeglasses which filter out the very specific wavelengths allow the wearer to see a full color 3D image. It is also known as spectral comb filtering or wavelength multiplex visualization or super-anaglyph. Dolby 3D uses this principle. The Omega 3D/Panavision 3D system has also used an improved version of this technology In June 2012 the Omega 3D/Panavision 3D system was discontinued by DPVO Theatrical, who marketed it on behalf of Panavision, citing "challenging global economic and 3D market conditions".

==== Color anaglyph systems ====
Difference in projections of a vertical line in stereoscopy according to distance between left $Z_L$ and right eye $Z_R$ - animation for eye distance $d$

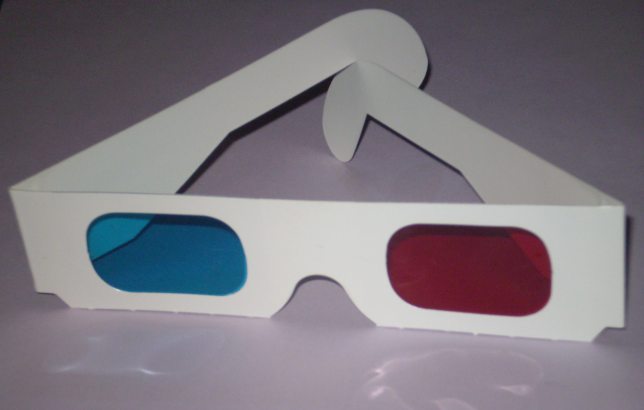
Anaglyph 3D glasses

Anaglyph 3D is the name given to the stereoscopic 3D effect achieved by means of encoding each eye's image using filters of different (usually chromatically opposite) colors, typically red and cyan. Red-cyan filters can be used because our vision processing systems use red and cyan comparisons, as well as blue and yellow, to determine the color and contours of objects. Anaglyph 3D images contain two differently filtered colored images, one for each eye. When viewed through the "color-coded" "anaglyph glasses", each of the two images reaches one eye, revealing an integrated stereoscopic image. The visual cortex of the brain fuses this into perception of a three dimensional scene or composition.

==== ChromaDepth system ====
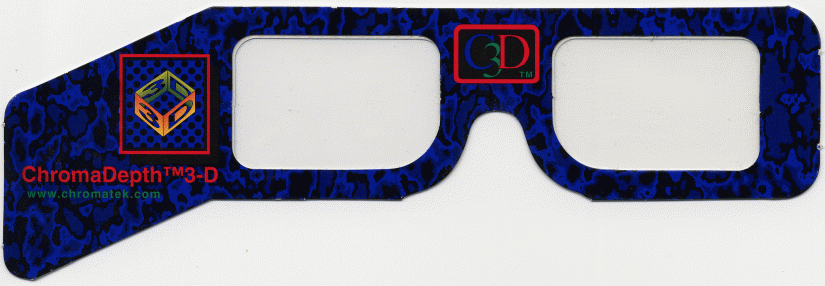
ChromaDepth glasses with prism-like film

The ChromaDepth procedure of American Paper Optics is based on the fact that with a prism, colors are separated by varying degrees. The ChromaDepth eyeglasses contain special view foils, which consist of microscopically small prisms. This causes the image to be translated a certain amount that depends on its color. If one uses a prism foil now with one eye but not on the other eye, then the two seen pictures – depending upon color – are more or less widely separated. The brain produces the spatial impression from this difference. The advantage of this technology consists above all of the fact that one can regard ChromaDepth pictures also without eyeglasses (thus two-dimensional) problem-free (unlike with two-color anaglyph). However the colors are only limitedly selectable, since they contain the depth information of the picture. If one changes the color of an object, then its observed distance will also be changed.

==== Pulfrich method ====
The Pulfrich effect is based on the phenomenon of the human eye processing images more slowly when there is less light, as when looking through a dark lens. Because the Pulfrich effect depends on motion in a particular direction to instigate the appearance of depth, it is not useful as a general stereoscopic technique. For example, it cannot be used to show a stationary object apparently extending into or out of the screen; similarly, objects moving vertically will not be seen as moving in depth. Incidental movement of objects will create spurious artifacts, and these incidental effects will be seen as artificial depth not related to actual depth in the scene.

==== Over/under format ====
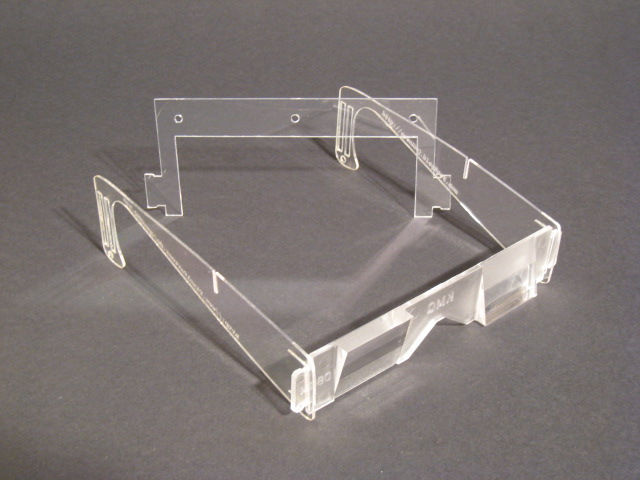
KMQ stereo prismatic viewer with openKMQ plastics extensions

Stereoscopic viewing is achieved by placing an image pair one above one another. Special viewers are made for over/under format that tilt the right eyesight slightly up and the left eyesight slightly down. The most common one with mirrors is the View Magic. Another with prismatic glasses is the KMQ viewer. A recent usage of this technique is the openKMQ project.

== Other display methods without viewers ==
=== Autostereoscopy ===
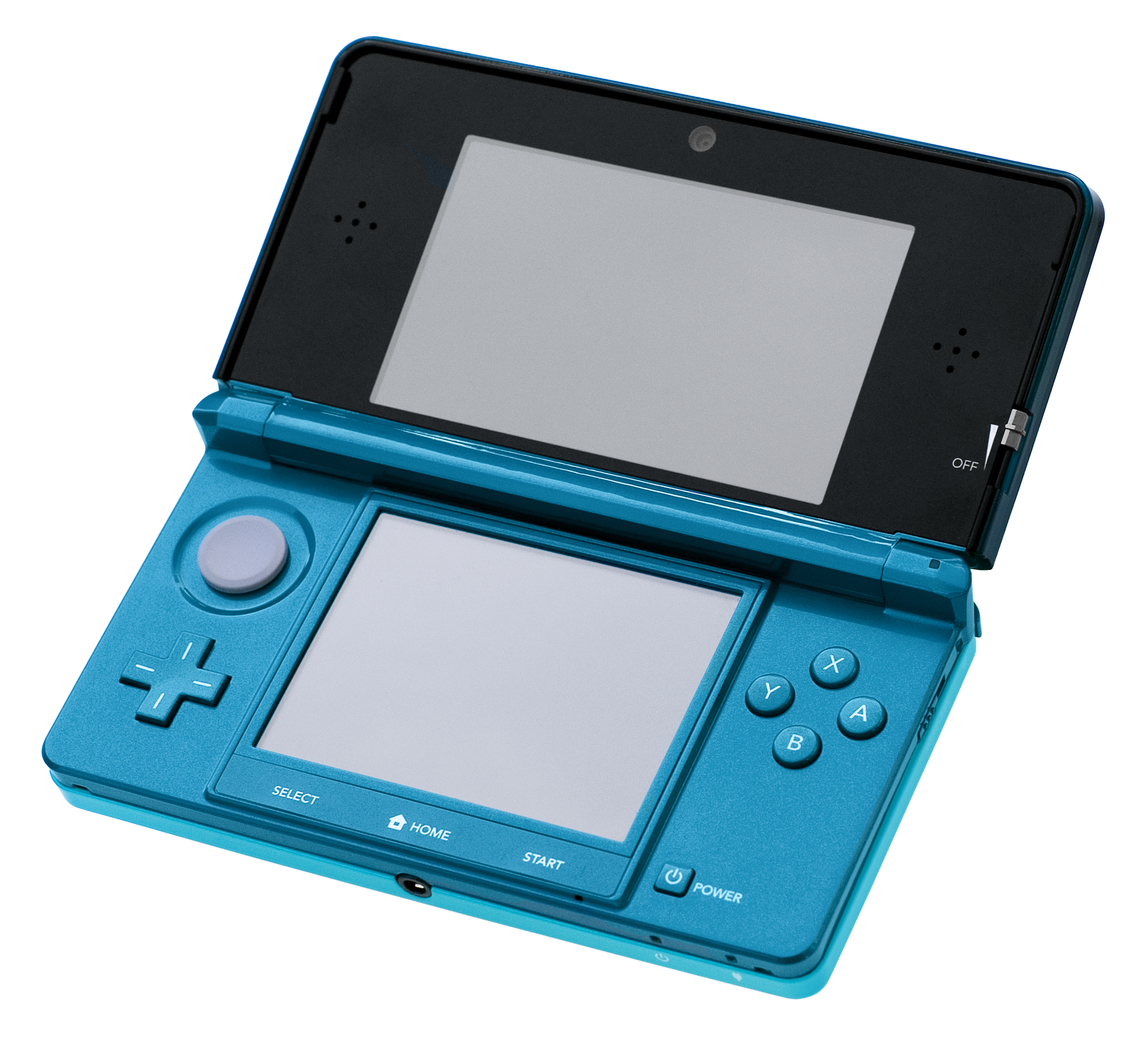
The Nintendo 3DS uses parallax barrier autostereoscopy to display a 3D image.

Autostereoscopic display technologies use optical components in the display, rather than worn by the user, to enable each eye to see a different image. Because headgear is not required, it is also called "glasses-free 3D". The optics split the images directionally into the viewer's eyes, so the display viewing geometry requires limited head positions that will achieve the stereoscopic effect. Automultiscopic displays provide multiple views of the same scene, rather than just two. Each view is visible from a different range of positions in front of the display. This allows the viewer to move left-right in front of the display and see the correct view from any position. The technology includes two broad classes of displays: those that use head-tracking to ensure that each of the viewer's two eyes sees a different image on the screen, and those that display multiple views so that the display does not need to know where the viewers' eyes are directed. Examples of autostereoscopic displays technology include lenticular lens, parallax barrier, volumetric display, holography and light field displays.

==== Holography ====
Laser holography, in its original "pure" form of the photographic transmission hologram, is the only technology yet created which can reproduce an object or scene with such complete realism that the reproduction is visually indistinguishable from the original, given the original lighting conditions. It creates a light field identical to that which emanated from the original scene, with parallax about all axes and a very wide viewing angle. The eye differentially focuses objects at different distances and subject detail is preserved down to the microscopic level. The effect is exactly like looking through a window. Unfortunately, this "pure" form requires the subject to be laser-lit and completely motionless—to within a minor fraction of the wavelength of light—during the photographic exposure, and laser light must be used to properly view the results. Most people have never seen a laser-lit transmission hologram. The types of holograms commonly encountered have seriously compromised image quality so that ordinary white light can be used for viewing, and non-holographic intermediate imaging processes are almost always resorted to, as an alternative to using powerful and hazardous pulsed lasers, when living subjects are photographed.

Although the original photographic processes have proven impractical for general use, the combination of computer-generated holograms (CGH) and optoelectronic holographic displays, both under development for many years, has the potential to transform the half-century-old pipe dream of holographic 3D television into a reality; so far, however, the large amount of calculation required to generate just one detailed hologram, and the huge bandwidth required to transmit a stream of them, have confined this technology to the research laboratory.

==== Volumetric displays ====
Volumetric displays use some physical mechanism to display points of light within a volume. Such displays use voxels instead of pixels. Volumetric displays include multiplanar displays, which have multiple display planes stacked up, and rotating panel displays, where a rotating panel sweeps out a volume.

Other technologies have been developed to project light dots in the air above a device. An infrared laser is focused on the destination in space, generating a small bubble of plasma which emits visible light.

==== Integral imaging ====
Integral imaging is a technique for producing 3D displays which are both autostereoscopic and multiscopic, meaning that the 3D image is viewed without the use of special glasses and different aspects are seen when it is viewed from positions that differ either horizontally or vertically. This is achieved by using an array of microlenses (akin to a lenticular lens, but an X–Y or "fly's eye" array in which each lenslet typically forms its own image of the scene without assistance from a larger objective lens) or pinholes to capture and display the scene as a 4D light field, producing stereoscopic images that exhibit realistic alterations of parallax and perspective when the viewer moves left, right, up, down, closer, or farther away.

Integral imaging may not technically be a type of autostereoscopy, as autostereoscopy still refers to the generation of two images.

=== Wiggle stereoscopy ===
Wiggle stereoscopy is an image display technique achieved by quickly alternating display of left and right sides of a stereogram. Found in animated GIF format on the web, online examples are visible in the New-York Public Library stereogram collection.

== Stereo photography techniques ==
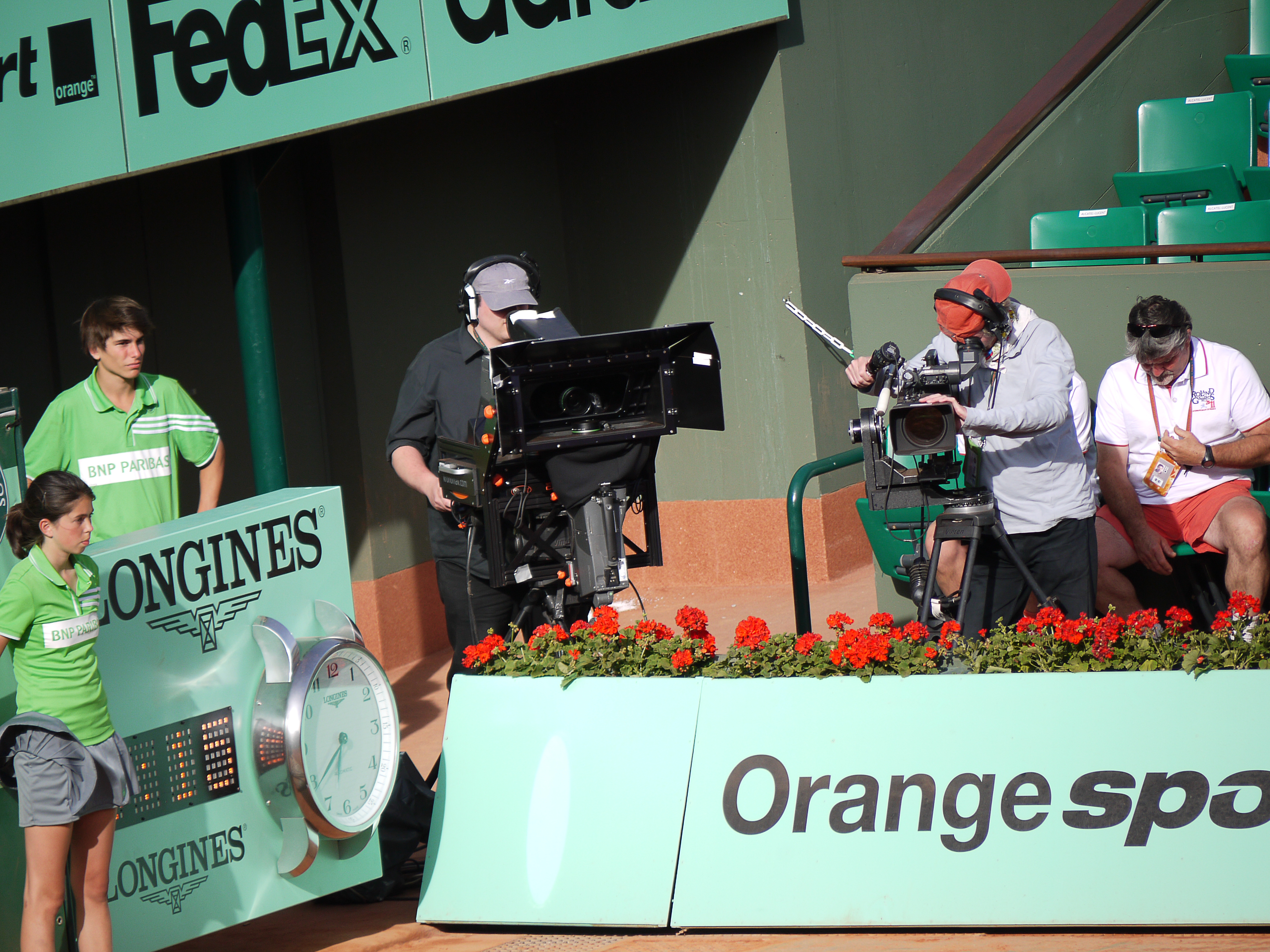
Modern stereo TV camera

For general-purpose stereo photography, where the goal is to duplicate natural human vision and give a visual impression as close as possible to actually being there, the correct baseline (distance between where the right and left images are taken) would be the same as the distance between the eyes. When images taken with such a baseline are viewed using a viewing method that duplicates the conditions under which the picture is taken, then the result would be an image much the same as that which would be seen at the site the photo was taken. This could be described as "ortho stereo."

However, there are situations in which it might be desirable to use a longer or shorter baseline. The factors to consider include the viewing method to be used and the goal in taking the picture. The concept of baseline also applies to other branches of stereography, such as stereo drawings and computer generated stereo images, but it involves the point of view chosen rather than actual physical separation of cameras or lenses.

== Stereo window ==
The concept of the stereo window is always important, since the window is the stereoscopic image of the external boundaries of left and right views constituting the stereoscopic image. If any object, which is cut off by lateral sides of the window, is placed in front of it, an effect results that is unnatural and is undesirable, this is called a "window violation." This can best be understood by returning to the analogy of an actual physical window. Therefore, there is a contradiction between two different depth cues: some elements of the image are hidden by the window, so that the window appears closer than these elements, and the same elements of the image appear closer than the window. As such, the stereo window must always be adjusted to avoid window violations to prevent viewer discomfort from conflicting depth cues.

Some objects can be seen in front of the window, as far as they do not reach the lateral sides of the window. But these objects cannot be seen as too close, since there is always a limit of the parallax range for comfortable viewing.

If a scene is viewed through a window the entire scene would normally be behind the window (assuming parallel view, with left images being seen by the left eye and vice versa). If the scene is distant, it would be some distance behind the window; if it is nearby, it would appear to be just beyond the window. An object smaller than the window itself could even go through the window and appear partially or completely in front of it. The same applies to a part of a larger object that is smaller than the window. The goal of setting the stereo window is to duplicate this effect.

Therefore, the location of the window versus the whole of the image must be adjusted so that most of the image is seen beyond the window. In the case of viewing on a 3D TV set, it is easier to place the window in front of the image, and to let the window in the plane of the screen.

On the contrary, in the case of projection on a much larger screen, it is much better to set the window in front of the screen (it is called "floating window"), for instance so that it is viewed about two meters away by the viewers sit in the first row. Therefore, these people will normally see the background of the image at the infinite. Of course the viewers seated beyond will see the window more remote, but if the image is made in normal conditions, so that the first row viewers see this background at the infinite, the other viewers, seated behind, will also see this background at the infinite, since the parallax of this background is equal to the average human interocular distance.

The entire scene, including the window, can be moved backwards or forwards in depth, by horizontally sliding the left and right eye views relative to each other. Moving either or both images away from the center will bring the whole scene away from the viewer, whereas moving either or both images toward the center will move the whole scene toward the viewer. This is possible, for instance, if two projectors are used for this projection.

In stereo photography window adjustments is accomplished by shifting/cropping the images, in other forms of stereoscopy such as drawings and computer generated images the window is built into the design of the images as they are generated.

The images can be cropped creatively to create a stereo window that is not necessarily rectangular or lying on a flat plane perpendicular to the viewer's line of sight. The edges of the stereo frame can be straight or curved and, when viewed in 3D, can flow toward or away from the viewer and through the scene. These designed stereo frames can help emphasize certain elements in the stereo image or can be an artistic component of the stereo image.

In freeview parallel method or glasses/stereoscope-assisted 3D viewing, “window violations” may refer to subjects that are cropped beyond the focal plane or screen (as if looking at part of a large object that fills a narrow window). However, most window violations refer to objects viewed in crossview (“popouts” where an object appears before the focal plane or screen; right image to left eye and vice versa), where parts of the object appear to be physically cropped; imagine a large object extruded through a small window such that its edges are literally cut off. This is a critical, traditional window violation before the window (between a viewer and the screen), and is most disorienting because parts of the popout object seem to be missing, rather than merely hidden as they would be with parallel-viewed objects beyond the window (depth).

== Uses ==
While stereoscopic images have typically been used for amusement, including stereographic cards, 3D films, 3D television, stereoscopic video games, printings using anaglyph and pictures, posters and books of autostereograms, there are also other uses of this technology.

=== Art ===
Salvador Dalí created some impressive stereograms in his exploration in a variety of optical illusions. Other stereoscopic artists include Zoe Beloff, Christopher Schneberger, Rebecca Hackemann, William Kentridge, and Jim Naughten. Red-and-cyan anaglyph stereoscopic images have also been painted by hand. The cultural and historical dimensions of stereoscopic imaging were examined in 3D: Double Vision (2018–2019) at the Los Angeles County Museum of Art, curated by Britt Salvesen, described as the first survey of the medium's nearly two-hundred-year history in a North American art museum.

=== Education ===
In the 19th century, it was realized that stereoscopic images provided an opportunity for people to experience places and things far away, and many tour sets were produced, and books were published allowing people to learn about geography, science, history, and other subjects. Such uses continued till the mid-20th century, with the Keystone View Company producing cards into the 1960s.

=== Space exploration ===
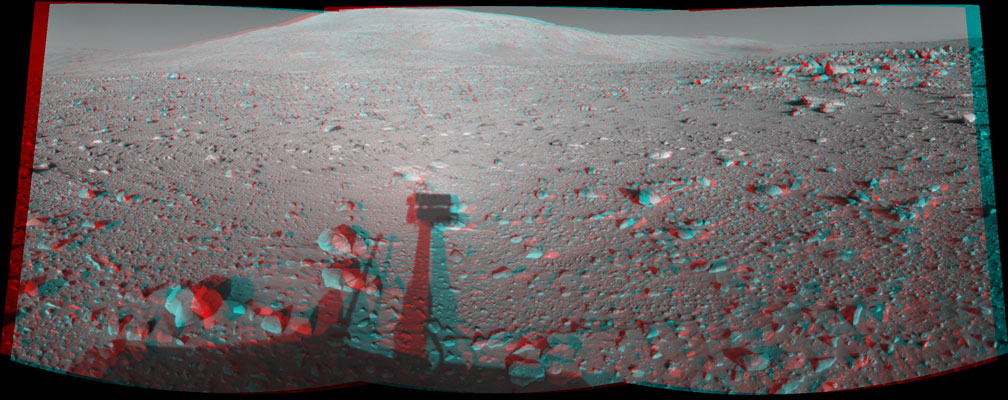
This image, captured on 8 June 2004, is an example of a composite anaglyph image generated from the stereo Pancam on Spirit, one of the Mars Exploration Rovers. It can be viewed stereoscopically with proper red/cyan filter glasses. A single 2D version is also available. Courtesy NASA/JPL-Caltech. 3D red cyan glasses are recommended to view this image correctly.

The Mars Exploration Rovers, launched by NASA in 2003 to explore the surface of Mars, are equipped with unique cameras that allow researchers to view stereoscopic images of the surface of Mars.

The two cameras that make up each rover's Pancam are situated 1.5m above the ground surface, and are separated by 30 cm, with 1 degree of toe-in. This allows the image pairs to be made into scientifically useful stereoscopic images, which can be viewed as stereograms, anaglyphs, or processed into 3D computer images.

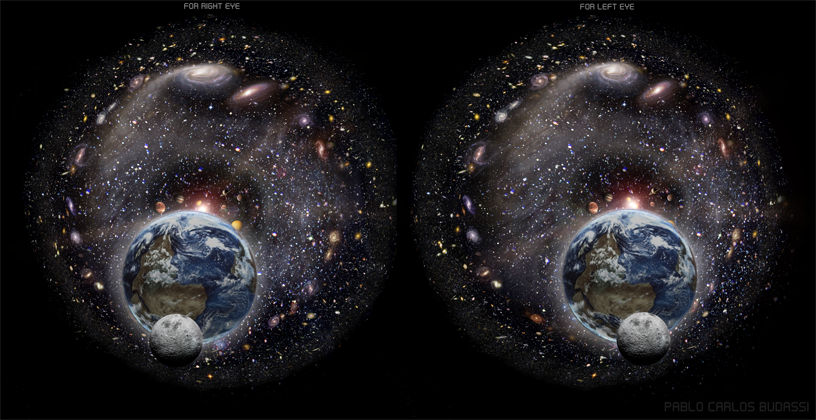
Cross-eyed stereography of an artistic depiction of the Solar System and nearby galaxies

The ability to create realistic 3D images from a pair of cameras at roughly human-height gives researchers increased insight as to the nature of the landscapes being viewed. In environments without hazy atmospheres or familiar landmarks, humans rely on stereoscopic clues to judge distance. Single camera viewpoints are therefore more difficult to interpret. Multiple camera stereoscopic systems like the Pancam address this problem with uncrewed space exploration.

=== Clinical uses ===
Stereogram cards and vectographs are used by optometrists, ophthalmologists, orthoptists and vision therapists in the diagnosis and treatment of binocular vision and accommodative disorders.

=== Mathematical, scientific and engineering uses ===
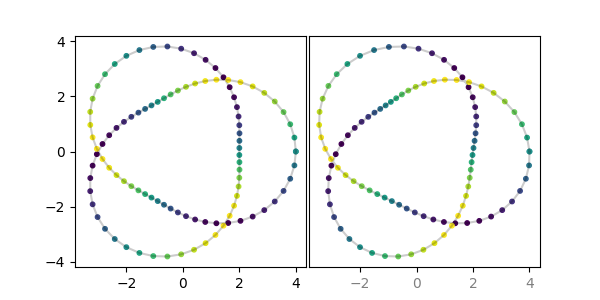
A stereogram of a trefoil knot, generated by the mpl_stereo extension to the Matplotlib open-source plotting library. The stereoscopic effect allows for seeing the otherwise hidden 3D structure.

Stereopair photographs provided a way for 3-dimensional (3D) visualisations of aerial photographs; since about 2000, 3D aerial views are mainly based on digital stereo imaging technologies. One issue related to stereo images is the amount of disk space needed to save such files. Indeed, a stereo image usually requires twice as much space as a normal image. Recently, computer vision scientists tried to find techniques to attack the visual redundancy of stereopairs with the aim to define compressed version of stereopair files. Cartographers generate today stereopairs using computer programs in order to visualise topography in three dimensions. Computerised stereo visualisation applies stereo matching programs. In biology and chemistry, complex molecular structures are often rendered in stereopairs. The same technique can also be applied to any mathematical (or scientific, or engineering) parameter that is a function of two variables, although in these cases it is more common for a three-dimensional effect to be created using a 'distorted' mesh or shading (as if from a distant light source).

=== Video games ===
Numerous video games from the 2010s have indulged in stereoscopic technology, with Top Spin 4 being a notable example. However, stereoscopic technology is far less prevalent today, with most video games and their companies preferring to manufacture games using VR (virtual reality).

== See also ==
- Cloud stereoscopy
- Binocular vision#Stereo images
