= Georg Stetter =

Austrian-German nuclear physicist (1895–1988)

Georg Carl Stetter (23 December 1895 – 14 July 1988) was an Austrian-German nuclear physicist. Stetter was Director of the Second Physics Institute of the University of Vienna. He was a principal member of the German nuclear energy project, also known as the Uranium Club. In the latter years of World War II, he was also the Director of the Institute for Neutron Research. After the war, he was dismissed from his university positions, and he then became involved in dust protection research. After his dismissal was overturned, he became Director of the First Physics Institute of the University of Vienna, and he began research on aerosols. In 1962, Stetter became a full Member of the Austrian Academy of Sciences. In that same year, the Academy established their Commission for Clean Air, and Stetter served as its chairman until 1985.

== Education ==
In 1914, Stetter studied at the Technische Hochschule Wien (today, the Technische Universität Wien). After one semester, he volunteered for military service. He began his service with the Radiodetachement des Kampftruppen und Kampfverbände Telegraphenregiments St. Pölten (Radiodetachement of the Combat Troops and Battle Units Telegraph Regiment St. Pölten). Later he was transferred to the leadership of a field radio station. Among other awards for his military service, he received the Goldenes Militär-Verdienstkreuz (Golden Military Merit Cross). His service awakened in him interest in electromagnetic waves and electronics. In 1919, after World War I, Stetter studied physics and mathematics at the Universität Wien (University of Venna). He received his doctorate in 1922.

== Career ==
Upon receipt of his doctorate, Stetter became a teaching assistant at the II. Physikalische Institut der Wiener Universität (Second Physics Institute of the University of Vienna).

The close association of the II. Physikalische Institut with the Institut für Radiumforschung (Institute for Radium Research) of the Österreichischen Akademie der Wissenschaften (ÖAW, Austrian Academy of Sciences) in Vienna brought Stetter in close contact with nuclear physics. Stetter's pioneering work in the use of electronics to measure the energy of nuclear particles earned him the Haitingerpreis (Haitinger Prize) of the ÖAW in 1926. He completed his Habilitation at the university in 1928. In 1935, he became the president of the Wiener Chemisch-Physikalischen Gesellschaft (Vienna Chemico-Physical Society). In 1937, he became Vertreter des Gauvereins Österreich im Vorstand der Deutschen Physikalischen Gesellschaft (Austrian District Association representative of the board of the German Physical Society). In 1938, he became a member of the Deutschen Akademie der Naturforscher (German Academy of Natural Scientists) in Halle. In 1939, he became an ordentlicher Professor (ordinarius professor) and director of the II. Physikalische Institut.In 1940, he became a corresponding member of the Österreichischen Akademie der Wissenschaften (Austrian Academy of Sciences). He was also the director of the Vereins zur Förderung des physikalischen und chemischen Unterrichts (Association for the Promotion of Teaching Physics and Chemistry). Stetter also joined the Nazi Party.

Soon after the discovery of nuclear fission in 1939, the German nuclear energy project, also known as the Uranverein (Uranium Club), started under the Reichsforschungsrat (RFR, Reich Research Council) of the Reichserziehungsministerium (REM, Reich Ministry of Education). The Heereswaffenamt (HWA, Army Ordnance Office) soon squeezed out the RFR and started the formal German nuclear energy project under military auspices. Military control of the Uranverein was initiated on 1 September 1939, the day World War II began, and the first meeting was held on 16 September 1939. The meeting was organized by Kurt Diebner, advisor to the HWA, and held in Berlin. The invitees included Walther Bothe, Siegfried Flügge, Hans Geiger, Otto Hahn, Paul Harteck, Gerhard Hoffmann, Josef Mattauch, and Georg Stetter. A second meeting was held soon thereafter and included Klaus Clusius, Robert Döpel, Werner Heisenberg, and Carl Friedrich von Weizsäcker. Also at this time, the Kaiser-Wilhelm Institut für Physik (KWIP, Kaiser Wilhelm Institute for Physics, after World War II the Max Planck Institute for Physics), in Berlin-Dahlem, was placed under HWA authority, with Diebner as the administrative director, and the military control of the nuclear research commenced.

On 14 June 1939, Stetter submitted a secret patent to the Deutschen Reichspatentamt (German Reich Patent Office) for the generation of energy through nuclear fission. The patent described a heterogeneous, moderated reactor, which would later be used widely. On 30 June 1958, the patent was re-registered in Austria, and it ran to 14 June 1971, when it was purchased by the Österreichischen Studiengesellschaft für Atomenergie (Austrian Society for the Study of Atomic Energy).

As a participant in the Uranverein, Stetter prepared reports with Karl Lintner on the inelastic dispersion of fast neutrons. Circa 1942, Stetter led a group of six physicists and physical chemists in measuring atomic constants and neutron cross sections, as well as investigating transuranic elements. In 1943, when he additionally became Director of the Institut für Neutronenforschung (Institute for Neutron Research), the II. Physikalische Institut and the Institut für Neutronenforschung were then under Stetter's unified directorship. Due to the war, the institutes set up the Aussenstelle Thumersbach (Thumersbach Branch Office) near Zell am See, Salzburg. It was there that Stetter conducted his first research on cosmic radiation.

In 1945, during the occupation of Austria by the Allied powers, Stetter was dismissed from his positions at the University of Vienna, because of his membership in the Nationalsozialistische Deutsche Arbeiterpartei (National Socialist Workers Party). From 1946 to 1948, he did not have a steady income; during this time, he worked in Zell am See for the Salzburg provincial government (Salzburger Landesregierung) and the American military government (amerikanische Militärregierung) on dust protection devices (Staubschutzgeräten). In 1949, he did pioneering work on an optical dust measuring device (optisches Staubmessgerät) for the German Coal Mining Association (deutschen Steinkohlenbergbauverein).

Stetter's dismissal from his university positions was waived by the Liquidator (Liquidator) in 1948 and by the Verwaltungsgerichtshof (Administrative Court) in 1950.

After the death of Felix Ehrenhaft in 1952, Stetter was appointed ordinarius professor and Director of the I. Physikalische Institut der Wiener Universität (First Physics Institute of the University of Vienna), where he started aerosol research. From 1955 to 1957, he was appointed head of the Österreichischen Staub-(und Silikose) Bekämpfungsstelle (Austrian Dust and Silikosis Prevention Agency). At this agency, he came in contact with the problems of industrial hygiene and air pollution. In 1962, Stetter became a full Member of the Österreichischen Akademie der Wissenschaften (Austrian Academy of Sciences). In that same year, the Austrian Academy of Sciences established their Kommission für Reinhaltung der Luft (Commission for Clean Air), and Stetter served as chairman from 1962 to 1985.

Stetter was an honorary member of the Österreichischen Physikalischen Gesellschaft (Austrian Physical Society) and the Chemisch Physikalischen Gesellschaft (Chemico-Physical Society). In 1966 he was awarded the Schrödinger-Preis (Schrödinger Prize) of the ÖAW. Stetter achieved emeritus status on 30 September 1967. In 1971, he received the Ehrenmedaille der Stadt Wien (Honorary Medal of the City of Vienna) and in 1986 the Österreichische Ehrenkreuz für Wissenschaft und Kunst I. Klasse (Austrian Honorary Cross for Science and Art, First Class).

== Internal Reports ==
Reports were published in Kernphysikalische Forschungsberichte (Research Reports in Nuclear Physics), an internal publication of the German Uranverein. The reports were classified Top Secret, they had very limited distribution, and the authors were not allowed to keep copies. The reports were confiscated under the Allied Operation Alsos and sent to the United States Atomic Energy Commission for evaluation. In 1971, the reports were declassified and returned to Germany. The reports are available at the Karlsruhe Nuclear Research Center and the American Institute of Physics.

- Georg Stetter, Josef Schintlmeister, Willibald Jentschke, Richard Herzog, Friedrich Prankl, Leopold Wieninger, Karl Kaindl, Franz Gundlach, Walter Biberschick, and Tullius Vellat Bericht über das II. Physikalische Institut der Wiener Universität G-345 (27 June 1945). [Institutional citations on the report were II. Physikalische Institut der Wiener Universität (Second Physics Institute of the University of Vienna), the Institut für Neutronenforschung (Institute for Neutron Research), and the Aussenstelle Thumersbach (Thumersbach Branch Office) near Zell am See, Salzburg. The Second Physics Institute of the University of Vienna and the Institute for Neutron Research were unified under the directorship of Stetter. As a result of the war, personnel and equipment had been moved to Schwallenbach and Thumersbach.]

== Selected literature ==
- Georg Stetter Die Massenbestimung von H-Partiklen, Zeitschrift für Physik, Volume 34, 158-177 (1925)
- Georg Stetter Die Massenbestimmung von Atomtrümmern aus Aluminium, Kohlenstoff, Bor und Eisen, Zeitschrift für Physik, Volume 42, Issue 9-10, pp. 741–758 (1927). Institutional affiliation: II. physikalisches Institut der Universität, Wien.
- E. A. W. Schmidt and G. Stetter Use of the electrometer tube amplifier for researches on protons [In German] Sitz. Akad. Wiss. Wien, Abt. Ila (1929)
- G. Ortner and G. Stetter On the choice of the coupling elements for an amplifier with small time constants [In German], Sitz. Akad. Wiss. Wien, Abt. Da (1933)
- G. Ortner and G. Stetter Pure nitrogen for ionization chambers [In German] Anz. Akad. Wiss. Wien (1933)
- G. Ortner and G. Stetter Electronic tube amplifiers for counting particles [In German] Sitz. Akad. Wiss. Wien, Abt. Ha (1938)
- G. Stetter Dust inspection by optical measurements [In German], Micro-technic (1949)

== Bibliography ==
- 40 Jahre KRL: Kommission für Reinhaltung der Luft der Österreichischen Akademie der Wissenschaften 1962–2002, Österreichische Akademie der Wissenschaften Kommission für Reinhaltung der Luft (2005)
- Hentschel, Klaus (editor) and Ann M. Hentschel (editorial assistant and translator) Physics and National Socialism: An Anthology of Primary Sources (Birkhäuser, 1996) ISBN 0-8176-5312-0
- Walker, Mark German National Socialism and the Quest for Nuclear Power 1939–1949 (Cambridge, 1993) ISBN 0-521-43804-7
