= Karatmeter =

Scientific instrument

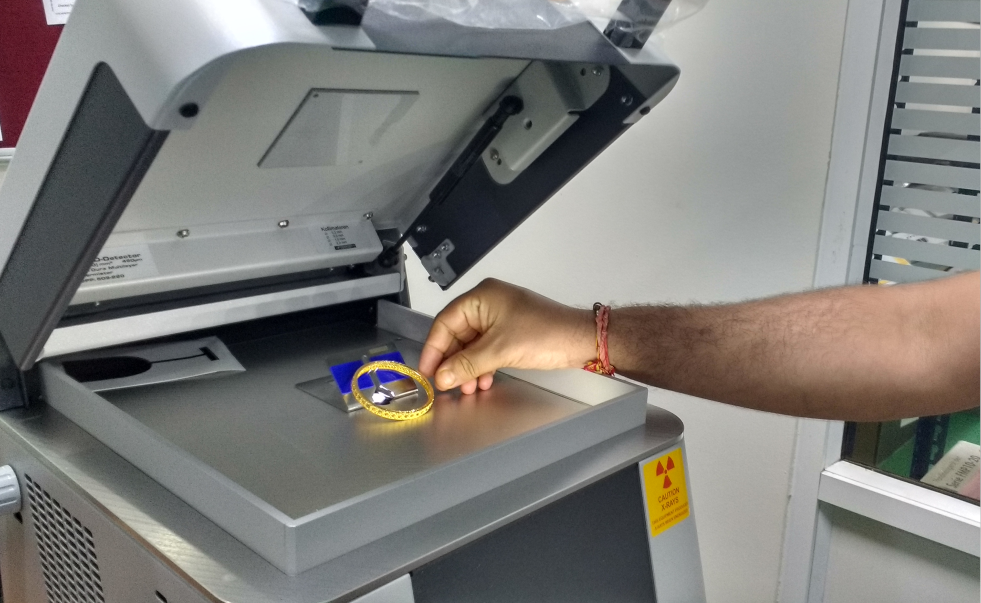
X-Ray based karat testing machine for gold purity testing

The Karatmeter is a scientific instrument which uses X-rays to give an exact reading of the purity of gold. The Karatmeter is also referred to as an X-ray fluorescence (XRF) spectrometer. It is a non-destructive means of testing the purity of gold and other related elements and alloys. Analyzing gold using XRF spectrometers gives the purity of gold, up to 10–12 microns, and hence it gives the analysis of an object's coating only. Using this technique, the precise percentage or karat (of karat) in a solid piece of jewelry can be determined.

Energy dispersive X-ray fluorescence (ED-XRF) is an analytical method for the determination of the chemical composition of many types of materials. It is non-destructive and is suitable for solid, liquid and powdered samples.

The karatmeter was introduced in 1998 by the Indian jewellery company Tanishq, to detect malpractice in purity declarations.
