= Kenneth H. Hunt =

Australian physicist

Kenneth Henderson Hunt (1920–2002) was Foundation Professor of Engineering at Monash University in Melbourne, Australia and an expert in kinematics.

Hunt was born in Seaford, East Sussex, in the United Kingdom, on 7 June 1920. He studied engineering at Balliol College, Oxford University and, during World War II, served in the Royal Engineers. After the war, he worked in the oil industry until 1949, when he took a lecturership at the University of Melbourne. He moved to Monash in 1960, at which time he was appointed Foundation Professor, and was dean of engineering there from 1961 to 1975. He is the author of Mechanisms and Motion (1959) and Kinematic Geometry of Mechanisms (1978).
