= K-factor (aeronautics) =

For aircraft fuel flow meters, K-factor refers to the number of pulses expected for every one volumetric unit of fluid passing through a given flow meter, and is usually encountered when dealing with pulse signals. Pressure and temperature sensors providing pulses can be used to determine mass flow, with division of the pulses by the K-factor, or multiplication with the inverse of the K-factor providing factored totalization, and rate indication. Furthermore, by dividing the pulse rate by the K-Factor, the volumetric throughput per unit time of the rate of flow can be determined.
