= Kiel probe =

Device used to measure properties of a fluid flow

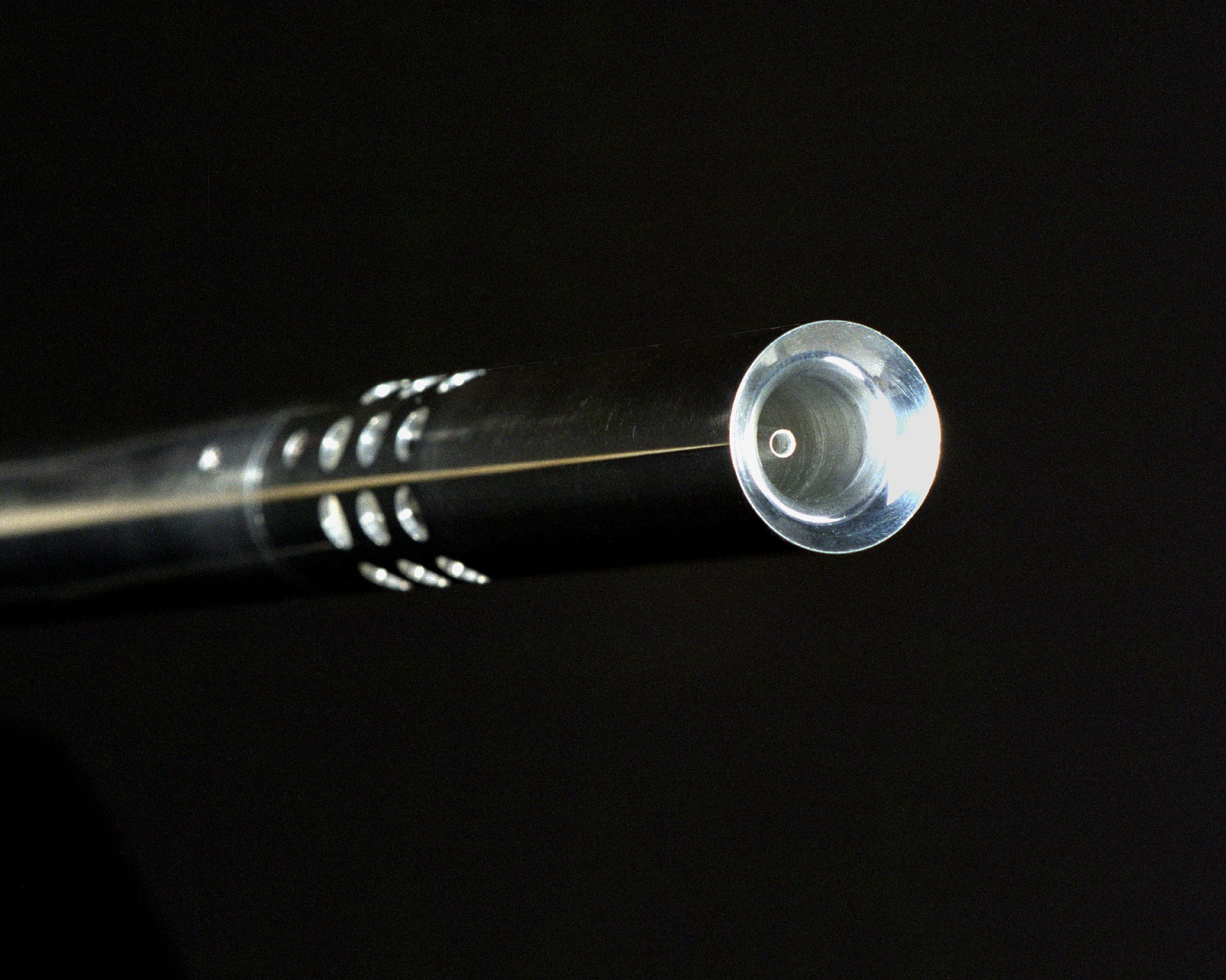
A Kiel probe from the Rockwell-MBB X-31 experimental aircraft

A Kiel probe is a device for measuring stagnation pressure or stagnation temperature in fluid dynamics. It is a variation of a pitot probe where the inlet is protected by a "shroud" or "shield." Compared to the pitot probe, it is less sensitive to changes in yaw angle, and is therefore useful when the probe's alignment with the flow direction is variable or imprecise.
