= Knapp's rule =

Knapp's Rule states that lenses placed at the anterior focal point of the eye, generally 15 mm in front of the eye, will create similarly sized images on the retina, whenever the disparity between the two eyes is due to a difference in axial length of the eyes.

When a refractive error is corrected with spectacle lenses, the retinal images change size. It is magnified with convex lenses and minified with concave lenses. One difficulty, then, in prescribing glasses to an individual with a disparity in refractive error between the two eyes is that a disparity in image size between the two eyes may be created.

There is some controversy as to the soundness of Knapp's Rule.
