= Kyriakos Tamvakis =

Greek theoretical physicist

- Born: January 1, 1950 (age 76); Greece
- Known for: quantum field theory, theoretical physics
- Scientific career
- Fields: Theoretical physicist
- Workplaces: University of Ioannina
- Doctoral advisor: Gerald Guralnik

Kyriakos Tamvakis (Greek: Κυριάκος Ταμβάκης; born in 1950) is a Greek theoretical physicist and professor at the University of Ioannina. Kyriakos Tamvakis studied at the University of Athens and gained his Ph.D. at Brown University, Providence, Rhode Island, USA in 1978. His thesis title was "Induced Boson Selfcouplings In Four Fermion And Yukawa Theories". Since then he has held several positions at CERN’s Theory Division in Geneva, Switzerland. He has been Professor of Theoretical Physics at the University of Ioannina, Greece, since 1982. Professor Tamvakis has published more than 100 articles on theoretical high-energy physics in various journals and has written two textbooks in Greek, on quantum mechanics and on classical electrodynamics.
