= Karl G. Kessler =

- Born: Hamburg, Germany
- Education: University of Michigan
- Scientific career
- Fields: Physics

Karl G. Kessler (1919–1997) was president of the Optical Society of America in 1969. He had also been the associate director for international and academic affairs at the National Institute of Standards and Technology.

== See also ==
- Optical Society Presidents
