= Kratos MS 50 =

- Other names: EI 50
- Uses: Mass spectrometry
- Manufacturer: Kratos
- Model: MS 50
- Related items: Sector instrument

The Kratos MS 50, or EI 50, is a tool for electron ionization (EI). The EI 50, used for relatively small molecules (as opposed to methods like MALDI), ionizes molecules via electron ionization (normally under 70 electronvolt conditions) and then accelerates them through an electric potential. The spectroscopy is done by analyzing the different displacements by a magnet. For equal charge, these displacements depend only on velocity, thus for the EI 50's constant kinetic energy conditions, these displacements are uniquely determined by a particle's mass.
