= Ken Riley (physicist) =

British physicist

Ken Riley is a physicist.

== Career ==
Ken Riley read mathematics at Clare College, University of Cambridge, and proceeded to a Ph.D. there in theoretical and experimental nuclear physics.

He became a research associate in elementary particle physics in Brookhaven, and then, having taken up lectureship at the Cavendish Laboratory, Cambridge, continued this research at the Rutherford Laboratory and Stanford; in particular he was involved in the experimental discovery of a number of the early baryonic resonances.

He taught physics and mathematics for over 40 years at Clare College and served on many committees concerned with the teaching and examining of these subjects at all levels of tertiary and undergraduate education. He was also a Senior Tutor and Admissions Tutor for twenty years.

He is also one of the authors of 200 Puzzling Physics Problems and Mathematical Methods for Physics and Engineering. He also wrote the memoir In Loco Parentis: a light-hearted look at the role of a Cambridge Tutor.
