= Kyong Won-ha =

North Korean nuclear scientist (born 1928)

- Born: 1928 (age 97–98); Pyongyang, Heian'nan Province, Korea, Empire of Japan
- Known for: North Korean nuclear program
- Scientific career
- Fields: Nuclear science

- Kyong Won-ha
- Hangul: 경원하
- Hanja: 慶元河
- RR: Gyeong Wonha
- MR: Kyŏng Wŏnha

Kyong Won-ha (Korean: 경원하; born 1928) is a nuclear scientist who may have participated in developing the North Korean nuclear program.

According to a 2003 report, he left North Korea in 2002 with help from Spanish officials, ultimately defecting to the United States.

== See also ==
- North Korea and weapons of mass destruction
- North Korean defectors
- Nuclear technology
