= Konrad Beyerle =

German engineer (1900-1979)

Konrad Beyerle (1900 in Freiburg im Breisgau – 1979) was a German engineer. During World War II, he was in charge of centrifuge research and development at Anschütz & Co. G.m.b.H. He participated in the development of ultracentrifuges for the enrichment of uranium done under the auspices of the German nuclear energy project, also known as the Uranium Club. After the war, he was head of the Institute for Instrumentation of the Max Planck Society.

== Education ==
Beyerle had a doctorate.

== Career ==
As late as 1935, Beyerle was employed at the Allgemeine Elektrizitäts-Gesellschaft (AEG, General Electric Company). No later than 1938, he was employed at the Anschütz & Co. G.m.b.H.

Shortly after the discovery of nuclear fission in December 1938/January 1939, the Uranverein, i.e., the German nuclear energy project, had an initial start in April before being formed a second time under the Heereswaffenamt (HWA, Army Ordnance Office) in September 1939. Beyerle soon brought his industrial expertise to the project for the development of an ultracentrifuge for the enrichment of uranium-235, in collaboration with Paul Harteck, director of the Physical Chemistry Department at the University of Hamburg, and his colleague Wilhelm Groth. Construction began in the autumn of 1941, and it was done under the auspices of an Heereswaffenamt contract let by Kurt Diebner, director of the Kernforschungsrat (Nuclear Research Council), under General Carl Heinrich Becker of the HWA. Konrad Beyerle was in charge of centrifuge development at Anschütz in Kiel. In 1943, enrichment to 5% was achieved, however, technical difficulties and the war hindered large-scale production. In July 1944, the Anschütz company was struck during an Allied air raid, and the exact part of the plant that was working on centrifuges was destroyed. Beyerle moved his effort south and merged with Hartick’s group in Freiburg and Kandern, the locations to which the Institute of Physical Chemistry had moved in hopes of avoiding Allied air raids. Avoiding the air raids only lasted until September 1944.On September 9, 1944, Beyerle proposed Harteck’s Plön Castle as a new location for continuing the isotope experiments with the UZ 1 and UZ III A centrifuges; ultimately, however, the decision was made to use Celle (the Spinnhütte silk mill). For safety reasons, only the UZ III A was set up there. In November 1944, the UZ III A was reassembled in Celle, and operations were successfully resumed in early February 1945, producing up to 50 grams of 15% enriched uranium per day.The advance of British troops finally brought production to a halt on April 12, 1945. The enriched uranium produced up to that point remained unaccounted for. A second ultracentrifuge, as well as the components for additional ones–which were needed for larger-scale production–had been moved to an unknown location but remained untraceable even after the war ended.

After World War II, Beyerle was head of the Institut für Instrumentenkunde (Institute for Instrumentation) of the Max-Planck-Gesellschaft (MPG, Max Planck Society, successor organization to the Kaiser-Wilhelm Gesellschaft), in Göttingen, where he continued research and development of centrifuges. Two of his colleagues at the institute were H. Freise and H. Billing.

== Internal Reports ==
The following report was published in Kernphysikalische Forschungsberichte (Research Reports in Nuclear Physics), an internal publication of the German Uranverein. The reports were classified Top Secret, they had very limited distribution, and the authors were not allowed to keep copies. The reports were confiscated under the Allied Operation Alsos and sent to the United States Atomic Energy Commission for evaluation. In 1971, the reports were declassified and returned to Germany. The reports are available at the Karlsruhe Nuclear Research Center and the American Institute of Physics.

- Konrad Beyerle Die Gaszentrifugenanlage für den Reichsforschungsrat G-248 (12 December 1944)

== Patents ==
- Konrad Beyerle (Kiel) Coupling Device, U.S. Patent 2,158,102, Assignor: Allgemeine Elektrizitäts-Gesellschaft (Berlin), Filing date: September 14, 1935
- Konrad Beyerle (Kiel-Neumuhlen) System for the Electrical Transfer of Rotary Motion U.S. Patent 2,157,094, Assignor: Anschütz & Co. G.m.b.H., Filing date: July 27, 1938
- Konrad Beyerle (Kiel-Neumuhlen) System for the Electrical Transfer of Rotary Motion U.S. Patent 2,184,576, Assignor: Anschütz & Co. G.m.b.H., Filing date: October 15, 1938
- Konrad Beyerle (Göttingen) Rotating System for Observation Centrifuges for the Determination of Molecular Weight, U.S. Patent 2,617,585, Filing date: March 31, 1950
- Konrad Beyerle (Göttingen) Damping Bearing for the Shafts of a Gas Centrifuge, U.S. Patent 3,097,167, Filing date: February 20, 1958
- Konrad Beyerle (Aachen) and Karl Heinz Wedge (Bonn) Centrifuge with Rotating Drum, U.S. Patent 3,281,067, Filing date: August 29, 1960
- Konrad Beyerle (Aachen) Mounting for Gyros, U.S. Patent 3,416,377, Filing date: April 18, 1966

== Books by Beyerle ==
- Konrad Beyerle, Wilhelm Groth, Paul Harteck, and Johannes Jensen Über Gaszentrifugen: Anreicherung der Xenon-, Krypton- und der Selen-Isotope nach dem Zentrifugenverfahren (Chemie, 1950), as cited in Walker, 1993, 278.

== Bibliography ==
- Hentschel, Klaus (Editor) and Ann M. Hentschel (Editorial Assistant and Translator) Physics and National Socialism: An Anthology of Primary Sources (Birkhäuser, 1996)
- Walker, Mark German National Socialism and the Quest for Nuclear Power 1939–1949 (Cambridge, 1993) ISBN 0-521-43804-7
