= Karl Lintner =

Austrian nuclear physicist

Karl Lintner (1917 – 11 February 2015) was an Austrian nuclear physicist. During World War II, he worked on the German nuclear energy project, also known as the Uranium Club; he did research on the inelastic dispersion of fast neutrons in uranium. After the war, he taught and did nuclear research at the University of Vienna. He was a full member of the Austrian Academy of Sciences.

== Education ==
From 1936 to 1940, Lintner studied physics at the Universität Wien. He received his doctorate in 1940, under Georg Stetter.

== Career ==
From 1941, Lintner was a teaching assistant to Georg Stetter at the Universität Wien. During World War II, Lintner worked on a team headed by Georg Stetter, a principal working on the German nuclear energy project, also known as the Uranverein (Uranium Club). Stetter led a group of six physicists and physical chemists in measuring atomic constants and neutron cross sections, as well as investigating transuranic elements; in 1943, Stetter held the unified directorship of the Institut für Neutronenforschung (Institute for Neutron Research), the II. Physikalische Institut and the Institut für Neutronenforschung (Institute for Neutron Research). Lintner did research on the inelastic dispersion of fast neutrons in uranium.

From 1945, Lintner was an assistant at the II. Physikalische Institut der Wiener Universität (Second Physics Institute of the University of Vienna), under Eduard Haschek, Karl Przibram, and Erich Schmid. From 1949, he was a Privatdozent at the university. Around 1959, he was a titular ausserordentlicher Professor (extraordinarius professor) there, and later an ordentlicher Professor (ordinarius professor). He was a full member of the Section for Mathematics and the Natural Sciences of the Österreichische Akademie der Wissenschaften

== Classified reports ==
- Georg Stetter and Karl Lintner Schnelle Neutronen im Uran. Der Zuwachs durch den Spaltprozeß und der Abfall durch unelastische Streuung (7 November 1941).

The following are cited as Geheimberichte (secret reports) on German nuclear research from the period 1939 to 1945 and which are being held in the Stadtarchiv Haigerloch:

- Georg Stetter and Karl Lintner Schnelle Neutronen in Uran (I)
- G. Stetter and K. Lintner Schnelle Neutronen in Uran (II und III): Streuversuche
- K. Lintner Schnelle Neutronen in Uranoxyd IV
- W. Jentschke and K. Lintner Schnelle Neutronen in Uran V. This paper is also identified as G-277. There are nearly 400 reports in the G-series. Many of the reports in this series were published in Kernphysikalische Forschungsberichte (Research Reports in Nuclear Physics), an internal publication of the German Uranverein. The reports were classified Top Secret, they had very limited distribution, and the authors were not allowed to keep copies. The reports were confiscated under the Allied Operation Alsos and sent to the United States Atomic Energy Commission for evaluation. In 1971, the reports were declassified and returned to Germany. The reports are available at the Karlsruhe Nuclear Research Center and the American Institute of Physics.

== Literature by Lintner ==
- K. Lintner, H. Moser, and J. Cerny On Spherical Setups used for the Determination of Cross Sections for Fast-Neutron Phenomena [In German], Sitzber. Osterr. Akad. Wiss., Math.-naturw. Klasse, Abt. IIa Volume 158, 123-34 (1950)
- K. Lintner Interaction of Fast Neutrons with the Heaviest Stable Nuclei (bi, Pb, Tl, and Hg) [In German], Acta Phys. Aust. Volume 3, 352-83 (1950)
- E. Schmid and K. Lintner Further Research on The Effects of Radiation on Metals [In German], Z. Metallk. Volume 51, 615-20 (1960). Institutional affiliation: University of Vienna.
- K. Lintner and E. Schmid The Problem of Radiation Influence of Solid Bodies, Nukleonik Volume 1, 29-40 (1958). Institutional affiliation: University of Vienna.
- K. Lintner Effect of Irradiation on the Plasticity of Metal Crystals [In German] Acta Physica Austriaca Volume 16, 256-64 (1963). Institutional affiliation: University of Vienna.
- K. Lintner Nuclear Physics Methods in Metal Physics [In German],Acta Physica Austriaca, Volume 18, 116-45 (1964). Institutional affiliation: University of Vienna.
- I. Schreiner and K. Lintner Study of Radiation Effets by Microhardness Measurements, Acta Physica Austriaca Volume 18, 292-6 (1964). Institutional affiliation: University of Vienna.

== Bibliography ==
- Hentschel, Klaus (editor) and Ann M. Hentschel (editorial assistant and translator) Physics and National Socialism: An Anthology of Primary Sources (Birkhäuser, 1996) ISBN 0-8176-5312-0
- Walker, Mark German National Socialism and the Quest for Nuclear Power 1939–1949 (Cambridge, 1993) ISBN 0-521-43804-7
