= Kasson S. Gibson =

- Died: January 8, 1979
- Scientific career
- Fields: Physics

Kasson S. Gibson was president of the Optical Society of America from 1939-40.

== See also ==
- Optical Society of America § Past Presidents of the OSA
