= KMQ viewer =

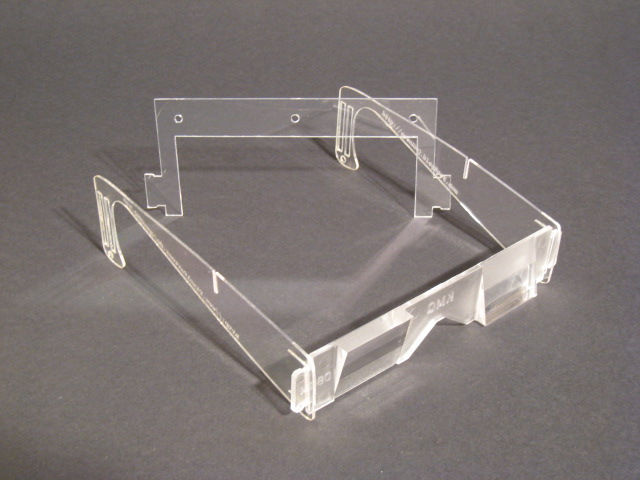
KMQ stereo prismatic viewer with openKMQ plastics extensions

KMQ viewer are glasses for viewing a stereoscopic over/under format. KMQ was invented in the 1980s by a team of three physicists. KMQ stands for the inventors' initials: Koschnitzke, Mehnert, Quick. A recent usage of this technique is the openKMQ project.

== Principle ==
An image pair is placed one above one another. The prismatic viewer tilts the right eyesight slightly up and the left eyesight slightly down.

Stereoscopic viewing is achieved at a matching distance to the glasses. When placing the right view on top of a (letter/A4 size) paper and the left view below, viewing from arm length distance (ca. 50 cm) creates a stereo experience. Bigger over/under stereo image pairs on either paper or a monitor can be viewed from a proportional greater distance. In general, the prisms achieve a 19° viewing angle.
