= Uehling =

Uehling may refer to:

== Places ==
- Uehling, Nebraska, United States

== People ==
- Barbara Uehling, American educator
- Edwin Albrecht Uehling, American physicist
  - Uehling potential named after E.A. Uehling
- O. C. Uehling, American architect
- Robert Uehling, American politician

== See also ==
- Ühlingen-Birkendorf
