= Kulenkampff =

Kulenkampff is a German surname. Notable people with the surname include:

- Georg Kulenkampff (1898–1948), German concert violinist
- Hans-Joachim Kulenkampff (1921–1998), German actor, television host and entertainer
- Helmuth Kulenkampff (1895–1971), German physicist
