= Fritz Sauter =

Austrian-German physicist (1906–1983)

- Born: 9 June 1906; Innsbruck, Austria-Hungary
- Died: 24 May 1983 (aged 76); Garmisch-Partenkirchen, West Germany
- Education: University of Innsbruck
- Known for: Sauter equation Sauter–Schwinger effect Sauter–Schwinger limit Spinors
- Scientific career
- Fields: Physicist
- Workplaces: Ludwig-Maximilians-Universität München; Technische Universität Berlin; University of Königsberg
- Doctoral advisor: Arthur March
- Other academic advisors: Arnold Sommerfeld; Richard Becker
- Doctoral students: Herbert Kroemer; Friedrich Bopp

Fritz Eduard Josef Maria Sauter (German: [ˈzaʊtɐ]; 9 June 1906 – 24 May 1983) was an Austrian-German physicist who worked mostly in quantum electrodynamics and solid-state physics.

== Education ==
From 1924 to 1928, Sauter studied mathematics and physics at the Leopold-Franzens-Universität Innsbruck. He received his doctorate in 1928 under Arthur March, with a thesis on Kirchhoff’s theory of diffraction. After graduation, he did postdoctoral studies with Arnold Sommerfeld and was his assistant at the Ludwig-Maximilians-Universität München. In January 1931, Sommerfeld recommended Sauter to Max Born, director of the Institute of Theoretical Physics at the University of Göttingen.

== Career ==
From 1931 to 1934, Sauter was an assistant to Richard Becker at the Technische Hochschule Berlin (today Technische Universität Berlin) in Charlottenburg. From 1933, he was also a lecturer at Berlin. While at Berlin, he did work on atomic physics and Dirac’s theory of electrons related to Klein's paradox.

Adolf Hitler came to power in Germany on 30 January 1933 and Max Born took leave as director of the Institute of Theoretical Physics at the University of Göttingen on 1 July of that year and immigrated to England. In 1934, Sauter, while only a Privatdozent, was brought in to Göttingen as acting director of the Institute of Theoretical Physics and lecturer on theoretical physics; Born was officially retired under the Nuremberg Laws on 31 December 1935. Sauter continued in this role until 1936, when Becker was appointed director, after the Reichserziehungsministerium (Reich Education Ministry) eliminated his position at Berlin and reassigned him to Göttingen.

After Göttingen, Sauter took a teaching assignment and became acting director of the theoretical physics department at the University of Königsberg. In 1939, he became ordinarius professor of theoretical physics and director of the theoretical physics department at Königsberg. From 1942 to 1945, Sauter was ordinarius professor of theoretical physics at the Ludwig-Maximilians-Universität München.

From 1950 to 1951, Sauter had a teaching assignment and was substitute director of the theoretical physics department at Technische Hochschule Hanover. From 1951 to 1952, he had a teaching assignment at the University of Göttingen and the University of Bamberg. In 1952, he became ordinarius professor and director of the theoretical physics department at the University of Cologne, which he held until achieving emeritus status in 1971.

Having been a student of Sommerfeld, Sauter was a superb mathematician. He wrote his own book on differential equations of physics, and, after Sommerfeld’s death in 1951, Sauter was editor on the 4th, 5th, and 6th editions of Sommerfeld’s book on the same subject, and he was also editor of the four volume, collected works of Sommerfeld. Sauter was also editor of books by Becker, with whom he had been an assistant in Berlin.

== Bibliography ==
Articles

- Fritz Sauter Über das Verhalten eines Elektrons im homogenen elektrischen Feld nach der relativistischen Theorie Diracs, Zeitschrift für Physik 69 (11-12) 742-764 (1931). Author cited as being at Munich.
- Fritz Sauter Über die Bremsstrahlung schneller Elektronen Annalen der Physik 412 (4) 404-412 (1934)

Books

- Fritz Sauter Differentialgleichungen der Physik (de Gruyter, 1950, 1958, and 1966)
- Arnold Sommerfeld, author and Fritz Sauter, editor Vorlesungen über theoretische Physik. Band 6: Partielle Differentialgleichungen der Physik. 4. Auflage, bearbeitet und ergänzt (Akademische Verlagsgesellschaft, 1958)
- Arnold Sommerfeld, author and Fritz Sauter, editor Vorlesungen über theoretische Physik. Bd. 6. Partielle Differentialgleichungen der Physik. 5. Auflage, bearbeitet und ergänzt (Akademische Verlagsgesellschaft, 1962)
- Arnold Sommerfeld, author and Fritz Sauter, editor Vorlesungen über theoretische Physik. Band 6: Partielle Differentialgleichungen der Physik. 5. Auflage, bearbeitet und ergänzt (Akademische Verlagsgesellschaft, 1962)
- Richard Becker, author and Fritz Sauter, editor Theorie der Elektrizität. Bd. 1. Einführung in die Maxwellsche Theorie (Teubner, 1957, 1962, 1964, and 1969)
  - Richard Becker, author, Fritz Sauter, editor, and Ivor De Teissier, translator Electromagnetic Fields and Interactions, Volume I: Electromagnetic Theory and Relativity (Blaisdell, 1964)
- Richard Becker, author and Fritz Sauter, editor Theorie der Elektrizität. Bd. 2. Einführung in die Quantentheorie der Atome und der Strahlung (Teubner, 1959, 1963, 1970, and 1997)
  - Richard Becker, author, Fritz Sauter, editor, and Ivor De Teissier, translator Electromagnetic Fields and Interactions, Volume II: Quantum Theory of Atoms and Radiation (Blaisdell, 1964)
- Arnold Sommerfeld, author and Fritz Sauter, editor Vorlesungen über theoretische Physik. Band 6: Partielle Differentialgleichungen der Physik. 6. Auflage, bearbeitet und ergänzt (Akademische Verlagsgesellschaft, 1966)
- Fritz Sauter, editor Arnold Sommerfeld: Gesammelte Schriften, 4 Volumes (Braunschweig, 1968)
- Richard Becker, author and Fritz Sauter, editor Theorie der Elektrizität. Bd. 3. Elektrodynamik der Materie (Teubner, 1969)
