= Ravndal =

Ravndal is a Norwegian surname. Notable people with the surname include:

- Christian M. Ravndal (1899–1984), American Career Foreign Service Officer
- Finn Ravndal (born 1942), Norwegian physicist
- Torkel Ravndal (1936–2004), Norwegian weightlifter and powerlifter
