= Ludwig Waldmann =

German physicist

Ludwig Waldmann (8 June 1913 in Fürth – 9 February 1980) was a German physicist who specialized in transport phenomena in gases. He derived the Waldmann-Snider equation.

== Career ==
Waldmann completed his Ph.D. under Arnold Sommerfeld at the Ludwig-Maximilians-Universität München in 1938. He was Sommerfeld’s assistant, at the Institute of Theoretical Physics, from 1937 to 1939. Waldman had been the scribe for Sommerfeld’s optics course in 1934, and Waldmann’s careful record of the lectures were the basis for Sommerfeld’s book Optics - Lectures on Theoretical Physics Volume IV.

After being granted his Ph.D. in 1938, his career spanned four decades with many publications to his name (at least 99):

- 1939–1943: Institute of Physical Chemistry, Munich
- 1943–1954: Kaiser-Wilhelm-Gesellschaft and the Max-Planck Institute (MPI) for Chemistry (In 1948 the Kaiser Wilhelm Gesellschaft facilities were named after Max Planck.)
  - 1943–1944: in Berlin
  - 1944–1949: in Tailfingen
  - 1949–1954: in Mainz
- 1954–1963: Fellow (wissenschaftliches Mitglied) of MPI, Mainz
- 1963–1978: Chair for Theoretical Physics, University of Erlangen–Nuremberg
  - 1964/1965 Academic Year: Visiting professor, Department of Chemical Engineering, University of Minnesota
  - 1974: Molecular Physics Group, University of Leiden
- 1978: Retired

Waldmann, for many years, was the chairman of the Thermodynamics and Statistical Physics section of the German Physical Society. He was also a corresponding member of the International Union of Pure and Applied Physics and a member of the Bavarian Academy of Sciences.

Waldmann’s technical contributions were in the areas of kinetic theory of molecular gases, transport phenomena in gases and liquids, and isotope separation. The venerable Handbuch der Physik published his 220-page article “Transporterscheinungen in Gasen von mittlerem Druck” – a chapter in the article conveyed the then new quantum mechanics version of the Boltzmann equation, which later became known as the Waldmann-Snider equation. The original Waldmann publications on the equation appeared in the literature in 1957 and 1958. Independently, R. F. Snider, a Canadian, published the same kinetic equation in 1960. This equation provided the framework for the interpretation of the Senftleben-Beenakker effect.

== Honors ==
- 1979 – Honorary Doctorate, University of Leiden

== Internal Reports ==
The following report was published in Kernphysikalische Forschungsberichte (Research Reports in Nuclear Physics), an internal publication of the German Uranverein. The reports were classified Top Secret, they had very limited distribution, and the authors were not allowed to keep copies. The reports were confiscated under the Allied Operation Alsos and sent to the United States Atomic Energy Commission for evaluation. In 1971, the reports were declassified and returned to Germany. The reports are available at the Karlsruhe Nuclear Research Center and the American Institute of Physics.

- Klaus Clusius, Gerhard Dickel, and Ludwig Waldmann Über die Beeinflussung des Wirkungsgrades von Draht-Trennrohren durch Zentrierung und Einbaur von Scheiben G-132 (20 February 1942)

== Bibliography ==
- Hentschel, Klaus (editor) and Ann M. Hentschel (editorial assistant and translator) Physics and National Socialism: An Anthology of Primary Sources (Birkhäuser, 1996) ISBN 0-8176-5312-0
- Hess, Siegfried “In Memoriam Ludwig Waldmann” Naturforsch. 58a 269-274, 2003. (The author had been a student of Waldmann in Erlangen.)
- Sommerfeld, Arnold, translated from the German by Otto Laporte and Peter A. Moldauer Optics - Lectures on Theoretical Physics Volume IV (Academic Press, 1964)
- Walker, Mark German National Socialism and the Quest for Nuclear Power 1939–1949 (Cambridge, 1993) ISBN 0-521-43804-7
