= George Uhlenbeck =

American physicist (1900–1988)

George Eugène Uhlenbeck
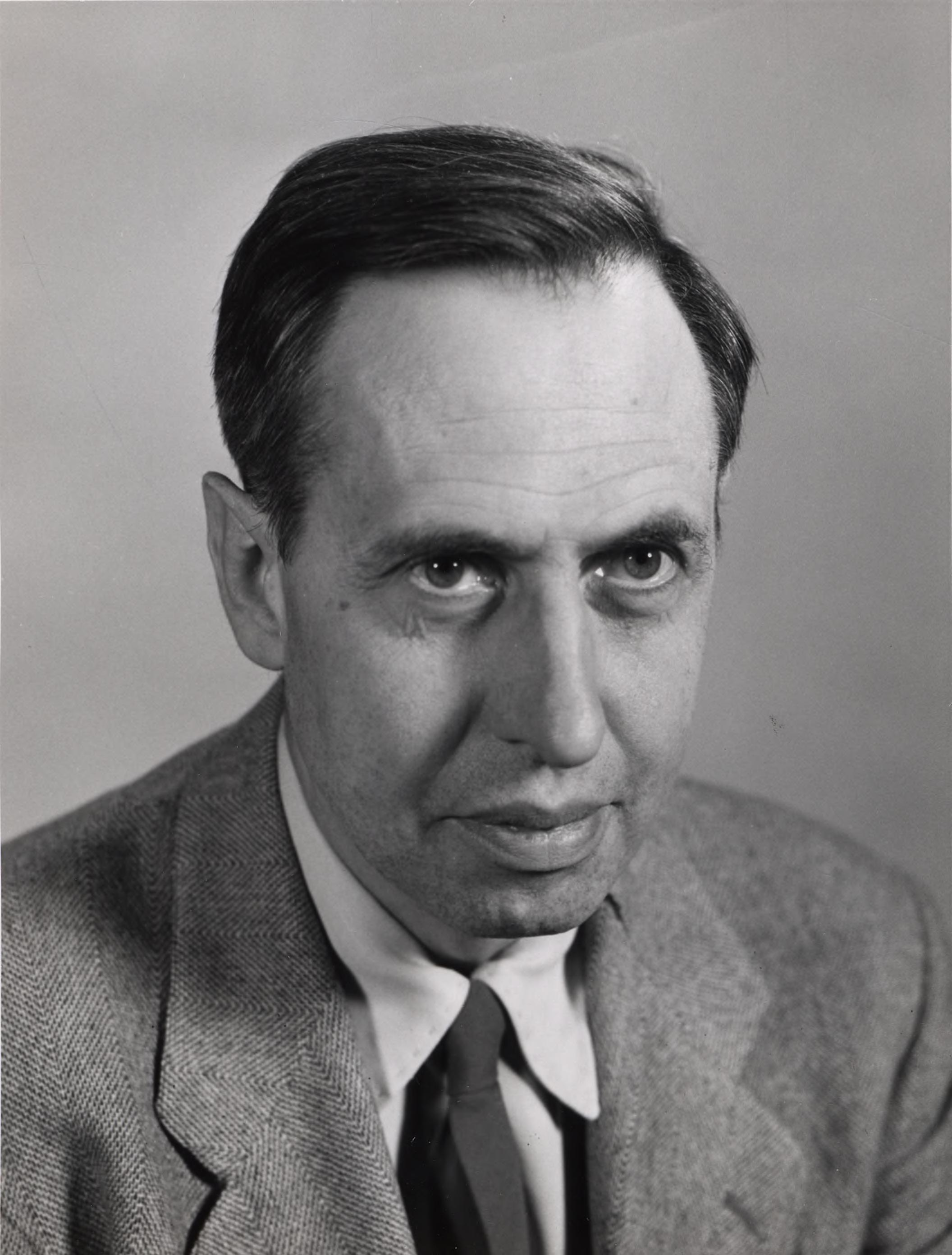
- Born: George Eugene Uhlenbeck; December 6, 1900; Batavia, Dutch East Indies (now Jakarta)
- Died: October 31, 1988 (aged 87); Boulder, Colorado, US
- Education: University of Leiden
- Known for: Electron spin Ornstein–Uhlenbeck process Uehling–Uhlenbeck equation
- Children: Olke C. Uhlenbeck
- Awards: Oersted Medal (1955); Max Planck medal (1964); Lorentz Medal (1970); National Medal of Science (1977); Wolf Prize in Physics (1979)
- Scientific career
- Fields: Physicist
- Workplaces: Columbia University; MIT; University of Michigan; Rockefeller Institute; Princeton University
- Doctoral advisor: Paul Ehrenfest
- Doctoral students: Max Dresden; Emil Konopinski; Edwin Albrecht Uehling; Seth Putterman; Wang Chengshu; Wang Ming-chen

George Eugene Uhlenbeck (December 6, 1900 – October 31, 1988) was a Dutch-American theoretical physicist, known for his significant contributions to quantum mechanics and statistical mechanics. He co-developed the concept of electron spin, alongside Samuel Goudsmit, in 1925. The formalization of Langevin equation for the Brownian motion as a stochastic process, is known as the Ornstein–Uhlenbeck process, derived in 1930 from his work with Leonard Ornstein. I. I. Rabi said that Uhlenbeck and Goudsmit's omission for the Nobel Prize in Physics "will always be a mystery to me".

== Background and education ==
George Uhlenbeck was the son of Eugenius and Anne Beeger Uhlenbeck. He attended the Hogere Burgerschool (High School) in The Hague, from which he graduated in 1918.

He subsequently entered Delft University of Technology as a student in chemical engineering. During the next year, he transferred to Leiden University, to study physics and mathematics, and he earned his bachelor's degree in 1920 (Dutch: Kandidaatsexamen). Uhlenbeck was then admitted by Paul Ehrenfest (a student of Ludwig Boltzmann's) to the Wednesday evening physics colloquium in Leiden. Ehrenfest became the most important scientific influence in his life. From 1922 to 1925 Uhlenbeck was the tutor of the younger son of the Dutch ambassador in Rome. While there, he attended lectures by Tullio Levi-Civita and Vito Volterra and met his longtime friend, Enrico Fermi. In 1923, Uhlenbeck received his master's degree from Leiden (Dutch: Doctoraalexamen).

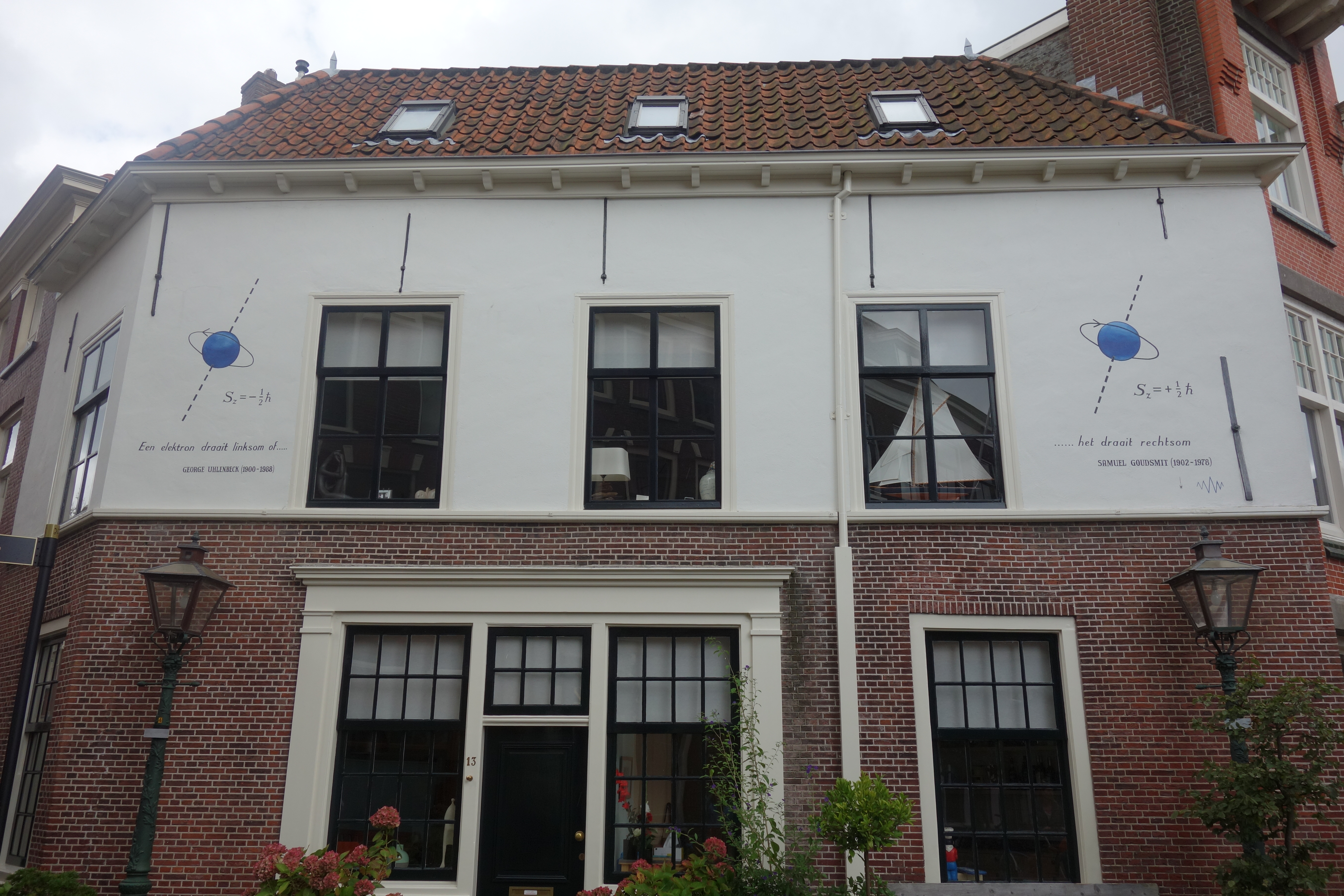
Visualization of electron spin on a wall in Leiden

He returned to Leiden in 1925 to become Ehrenfest's assistant. Ehrenfest assigned him to work with his graduate student, Samuel Goudsmit for a quick update on "what was currently happening in physics". In mid-September 1925, Uhlenbeck and Goudsmit introduced electron spin, which posits intrinsic angular momentum for the electron. In 1927 Uhlenbeck earned his Ph.D. degree under Ehrenfest with his thesis titled: "Over Statistische Methoden in de Theorie der Quanta" ("On Statistical Methods in the Quantum Theory").

Uhlenbeck married Else Ophorst in Arnhem, Netherlands in August 1927. He received a doctorate from the Leiden University in the same year.

== Career ==
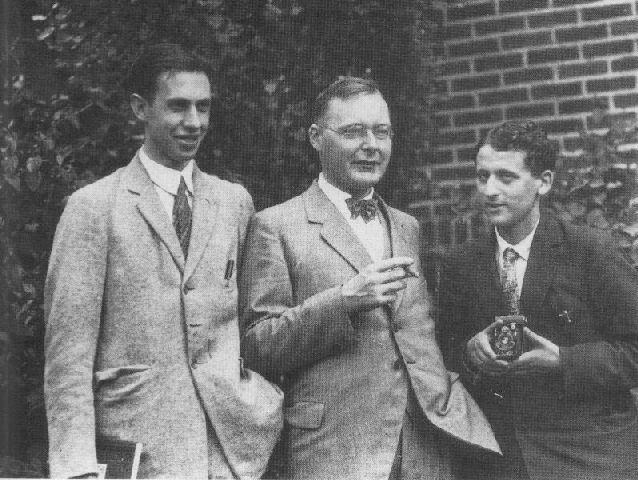
G.E. Uhlenbeck, H.A. Kramers, and S.A. Goudsmit circa 1928 at the University of Michigan in Ann Arbor

In 1927, Uhlenbeck took a position as an instructor in physics at the University of Michigan in Ann Arbor, Michigan. He stayed there until 1935, when he succeeded H. A. Kramers as a professor of theoretical physics in Utrecht. During his eight years in Ann Arbor, Uhlenbeck organized the noted "Summerschool" in theoretical physics.

In 1938, Uhlenbeck spent half a year as visiting professor at Columbia University in New York City, and then he returned to Ann Arbor as a professor of theoretical physics during the next year. Because of the rise of Nazism in Europe, he and Else decided to leave his position in the Netherlands and return to America.

During part of World War II, from 1943 through 1945, Uhlenbeck led a theory group at the Radiation Laboratory in Cambridge, Massachusetts, which was doing radar research. In 1945, he returned to Ann Arbor, where he was named the Henry Smith Carhart Professor of Physics in 1954. In the year 1955 he occupied the Lorentz Chair at Leiden University. Uhlenbeck remained in Ann Arbor until 1960, when he joined the Rockefeller Institute for Medical Research (now the Rockefeller University) in New York City as a professor and member of the institute.

Uhlenbeck developed the physical theory of the Ornstein–Uhlenbeck process. In 1933, Uhlenbeck and Edwin Uehling extended classical kinetic theory to gases obeying Bose–Einstein and Fermi–Dirac statistics. Their treatment generalized the theory of transport phenomena to quantum gases and derived hydrodynamic equations together with expressions for viscosity and thermal conductivity. The resulting kinetic equation, now known as the Uehling–Uhlenbeck equation, incorporates the effects of quantum statistics into the description of particle collisions.

== Retirement and death ==
He retired in 1971, but remained scientifically active until the early 1980s.

Uhlenbeck died on October 31, 1988, in Boulder, Colorado, at the age of 87.

== Recognition ==
Uhlenbeck received five honorary degrees. In addition, he received the Research Corporation award in 1953, the Oersted Medal of the American Association of Physics Teachers in 1955, the Max Planck Medal of the German Physical Society in 1964, the Lorentz Medal of the Royal Netherlands Academy of Arts and Sciences in 1970, the National Medal of Science in 1977, along with Goudsmit, and the Wolf Prize in Physics in 1979.

In 1951 he became member of the Royal Netherlands Academy of Arts and Sciences. He was elected to the United States National Academy of Sciences in 1955, the American Philosophical Society in 1957, and the American Academy of Arts and Sciences in 1964.

Uhlenbeck was a friend of many of the great physicists and mathematicians of his era, including Enrico Fermi and Oskar Klein. Abraham Pais called him "a supurb teacher. I never heard a man who could lecture with such clarity. E.G.D. Cohen, a student of Uhlenbeck's, described his teacher:

... [Uhlenbeck] often admonished me that rather than trying to be original, it was much more important to be clear and correct and to summarise critically the present status of a field in the Ehrenfest tradition. He wisely observed that what is often of lasting value is not the first original contribution to a problem, but rather the final clearly and critically written survey. That is certainly what he did in this Brownian motion paper!

Describing Uhlenbeck's work, Cohen writes:

Uhlenbeck's papers are all relatively short and stand out by their conciseness, precision, and clarity, finely honed to a deeper understanding of a basic problem in statistical physics. They do not contain long formal derivations and are almost all geared to concrete problems. ... they were of a classic nobility, mathematical purity and clarity ... He felt that something really original one did only once – like the electron-spin--the rest of one's time one spent on clarifying the basics.

Cohen also comments on the high quality of Uhlenbeck's teaching:

He was an inspiring teacher. With superbly organised and extremely clear lectures, he laid bare for everyone to see the beautiful structure of statistical mechanics, based on the principles of the founding fathers, Maxwell, Boltzmann, and Gibbs. Thus he transmitted to a younger generation what he conceived to be the essence of the past and the way to the future. In doing so, he educated several generations of physicists in statistical mechanics in a style rare in this century.

== See also ==
- Ornstein–Uhlenbeck process
