= Ottokar Tumlirz =

Austrian physicist (1856–1928)

- Born: 17 January 1856; Weipert, Kingdom of Bohemia
- Died: 4 May 1928 (aged 72); Innsbruck, Austria
- Education: Charles University in Prague
- Scientific career
- Fields: Physics
- Workplaces: University of Innsbruck
- Doctoral advisor: Ernst Mach
- Doctoral students: Arthur March

Ottokar Tumlirz (17 January 1856 – 4 May 1928) was an Austrian physicist.

== Biography ==
He received his education at the University of Prague, obtaining his doctorate with a thesis on the expansion of sound and light waves (1879). At Prague he worked as an assistant to Ernst Mach (1838–1916) in the institute of experimental physics. After serving as a lecturer for several years in Prague, he relocated to the University of Vienna in 1890 as an assistant to Joseph Stefan (1835–1893). During the following year he was appointed associate professor of theoretical physics at the University of Czernowitz, where in 1894 he attained the title of "full professor". From 1905 to 1925 he served as a professor at the University of Innsbruck. Following his retirement, he was succeeded at Innsbruck by Arthur March (1891–1957).

His scientific research largely dealt with the specifics of thermodynamics and electromagnetism. He was the author of well-regarded books on the electromagnetic theory of light and electric potential.

- Elektromagnetische Theorie des Lichtes, (1883) - Electromagnetic theory of light.
- Das Potential und seine Anwendung zu der Erklärung der elektrischen Erscheinungen, (1884) - Potential and its application to the explanation of electrical phenomena.

In 1908 Tumlirz described careful and effective experiments which demonstrated the effect of the rotation of the Earth on the outflow of water through a central aperture, in a paper entitled "New physical evidence on the axis of rotation of the earth".
