= Sieved ultraspherical polynomials =

In mathematics, the two families c^{λ}_{n}(x;k) and B^{λ}_{n}(x;k) of sieved ultraspherical polynomials, introduced by Waleed Al-Salam, W.R. Allaway and Richard Askey in 1984, are the archetypal examples of sieved orthogonal polynomials. Their recurrence relations are a modified (or "sieved") version of the recurrence relations for ultraspherical polynomials.

== Recurrence relations ==
For the sieved ultraspherical polynomials of the first kind the recurrence relations are

$2xc_n^\lambda(x;k) = c_{n+1}^\lambda(x;k) + c_{n-1}^\lambda(x;k)$ if n is not divisible by k
$$2x(m+\lambda)c_{mk}^\lambda(x;k) = (m+2\lambda)c_{mk+1}^\lambda(x;k) + mc_{mk-1}^\lambda(x;k)$$

For the sieved ultraspherical polynomials of the second kind the recurrence relations are

$2xB_{n-1}^\lambda(x;k) = B_{n}^\lambda(x;k) + B_{n-2}^\lambda(x;k)$ if n is not divisible by k
$$2x(m+\lambda)B_{mk-1}^\lambda(x;k) = mB_{mk}^\lambda(x;k) +(m+2\lambda)B_{mk-2}^\lambda(x;k)$$
