= Ernst Wagner =

German physicist

- Born: 14 August 1876; Hildburghausen, German Empire
- Died: 1 November 1928 (aged 52); Würzburg, Germany
- Education: University of Würzburg; Friedrich Wilhelm University of Berlin; Ludwig-Maximilians-Universität München
- Scientific career
- Fields: Physicist
- Workplaces: University of Würzburg; Ludwig-Maximilians-Universität München
- Doctoral advisor: Wilhelm Röntgen
- Doctoral students: Helmuth Kulenkampff

Ernst Wagner (1876–1928) was a German physicist. He was born on 14 August 1876 at Hildburghausen. He first studied medicine and physics at the University of Würzburg, the Friedrich Wilhelm University of Berlin, and the Ludwig-Maximilians-Universität München, obtaining his doctorate under Wilhelm Röntgen in 1903. He became Privatdozent in spring 1909 and extraordinary professor in 1915 at the Ludwig-Maximilians-Universität München. Wagner was notable for his work on X-rays and on the absolute measurement of high pressure.
