= Uehling potential =

Coulomb potential with vacuum polarization corrections

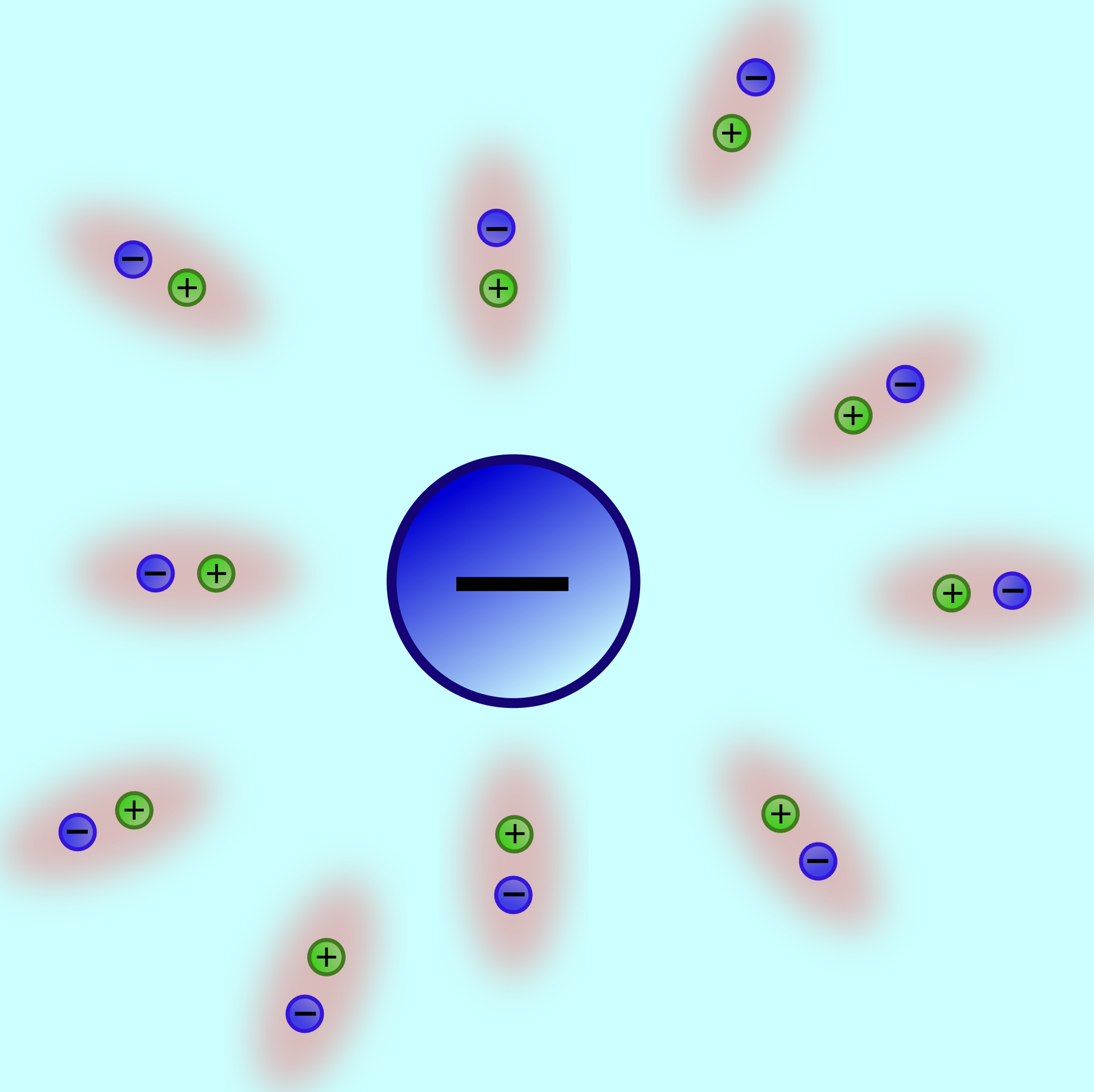
The vacuum (light blue) acts as a polarizable medium (composed of virtual particle–antiparticle pairs) that slightly modify the electric potential of the electron (depicted in the middle with minus sign).

In quantum electrodynamics, the Uehling potential describes the interaction potential between two electric charges which, in addition to the classical Coulomb potential, contains an extra term responsible for the electric polarization of the vacuum. This potential was found by Edwin Albrecht Uehling in 1935.

Uehling's corrections take into account that the electromagnetic field of a point charge does not act instantaneously at a distance, but rather it is an interaction that takes place via exchange particles, the photons. In quantum field theory, due to the uncertainty principle between energy and time, a single photon can briefly form a virtual particle–antiparticle pair, that influences the point charge. This effect is called vacuum polarization, because it makes the vacuum appear like a polarizable medium. By far the dominant contribution comes from the lightest charged elementary particle, the electron. The corrections by Uehling are negligible in everyday practice, but it allows the calculation of spectral lines of hydrogen-like atoms with high precision.

== Definition ==
The Uehling potential is given by (units $c=1$ and $\hbar=1$)

$$V(r)=\frac{-e^2}{4\pi r}\left(1+\frac{e^2}{6\pi^2}\int_1^\infty dx \, e^{-2rm_\text{e}x}\frac{2x^2+1}{2x^4}\sqrt{x^2-1}\right),$$

from where it is apparent that this potential is a refinement of the classical Coulomb potential. Here $m_\text{e}$ is the electron mass and $e$ is the elementary charge measured at large distances.

If $r\gg 1/m_\text{e}$, this potential simplifies to

$$V(r)\approx\frac{-e^2}{4\pi  r}\left(1+\frac{e^2}{16\pi^{3/2}}\frac{1}{(m_\text{e}r)^{3/2}}e^{-2m_\text{e}r}\right),$$

while for $r\ll 1/m_\text{e}$ we have

$$V(r)\approx\frac{-e^2}{4\pi  r}\left(1+\frac{e^2}{6\pi^2}\left(\log\frac{1}{m_\text{e}r}-\gamma-\frac{5}{6}\right)\right),$$

where $\gamma$ is the Euler–Mascheroni constant (0.57721...).

The integral in the Uehling potential has recently been solved analytically in terms of Meijer G-functions, allowing the potential to be presented as follows:

$$V(r)=\frac{-e^2}{4\pi r} \Biggl\{ 1+\frac{e^2}{6\pi^2} \left[ \frac{3}{2 \pi} \bar r + \frac{2}{3 \pi} \bar r^3 +  \frac{1}{2} \text{G}_{2,4}^{2,0} \!\left( \left. \begin{matrix} \frac{1}{2}, \frac{3}{2} \\ 0, 1, \frac{1}{2}, \frac{1}{2} \end{matrix} \; \right| \, \bar r^2 \right) + \frac{1}{4} \text{G}_{2,4}^{2,0} \!\left( \left. \begin{matrix} \frac{1}{2}, \frac{5}{2} \\ 0, 1, \frac{1}{2}, \frac{1}{2} \end{matrix} \; \right| \, \bar r^2 \right) \right] \Biggl\},$$

with $\bar r = m_\text{e}r$.

=== Properties ===
It was recently demonstrated that the above integral in the expression of $V(r)$ can be evaluated in closed form by using the modified Bessel functions of the second kind $K_0(z)$ and its successive integrals.

A more concise analytic expression for the Uehling potential is presented as follows:

$$V(r)=\frac{-e^2}{4\pi r} \Biggl\{ 1-\frac{e^2}{16\pi^2} \text{G}_{2,4}^{4,0} \!\left( \left. \begin{matrix} 1, \frac{5}{2} \\ 0, 0, \frac{1}{2}, 2 \end{matrix} \; \right| \, (m_\text{e}r)^2 \right)  \Biggl\}.$$

The properties of Meijer G-functions enable the analytic representation of the Uehling potential to greatly simplify various computations, including but not restricted to derivatives, integrals, convolutions, and transformations such as the Laplace transform. The three-dimensional Fourier-transformed Uehling potential is given for both analytic expressions as follows:

$\hat{V}(k) = \frac{e^2}{9 \pi k^2} \left( 5 - \frac{12}{k^2} + \frac{6 \left(8 - 2k^2 - k^4\right) \, \operatorname{arccsch}\left(\frac{2}{k}\right)}{k^3 \sqrt{k^2 + 4}} \right).$

== Effect on atomic spectra ==
Feynman diagram for vacuum polarization. Representing a virtual particle–antiparticle pair (loop with arrows) as a self-energy correction to the photon (wavy line).

Since the Uehling potential only makes a significant contribution at small distances close to the nucleus, it mainly influences the energy of the s orbitals. Quantum mechanical perturbation theory can be used to calculate this influence in the atomic spectrum of atoms. The quantum electrodynamics corrections for the degenerated energy levels $2\mathrm{S}_{1/2}$ of the hydrogen atom are given by

$$\Delta E(2\mathrm{S}_{1/2}) \approx -1{.}122\times 10^{-7}  \, \text{eV}$$

up to leading order in $m_\text{e}c^2$. Here $\mathrm{eV}$ is the unit electronvolt.

Since the wave function of the s orbitals does not vanish at the origin, the corrections provided by the Uehling potential are of the order $\alpha^5$ (where $\alpha$ is the fine-structure constant) and it becomes less important for orbitals with a higher azimuthal quantum number. This energy splitting in the spectra is about a ten times smaller than the fine structure corrections provided by the Dirac equation and this splitting is known as the Lamb shift (which includes Uehling potential and additional higher corrections from quantum electrodynamics).

The Uehling effect is also central to muonic hydrogen as most of the energy shift is due to vacuum polarization. In contrast to other variables such as the splitting through the fine structure, which scale together with the mass of the muon, i.e. by a factor of $m_\mu/m_\mathrm e\approx 200$, the light electron mass continues to be the decisive size scale for the Uehling potential. The energy corrections are on the order of $(m^3_\mu/m_\mathrm e^2)c^2\alpha^5$.

== See also ==
- QED vacuum
- Virtual particles
- Anomalous magnetic dipole moment
- Schwinger limit
- Schwinger effect
- Euler–Heisenberg Lagrangian
