= Félix Pollaczek =

Austrian-French engineer and mathematician

- Born: December 1, 1892; Vienna, Austria-Hungary
- Died: April 29, 1981 (aged 88); Boulogne-Billancourt, France
- Education: Technical University of Vienna; Technical University of Brno; University of Berlin
- Scientific career
- Institutions: AEG; Reichspost; SELT; CNRS
- Doctoral advisor: Issai Schur

Félix Pollaczek (1 December 1892 in Vienna – 29 April 1981 at Boulogne-Billancourt) was an Austrian-French engineer and mathematician, known for numerous contributions to number theory, mathematical analysis, mathematical physics and probability theory. He is best known for the Pollaczek–Khinchine formula in queueing theory (1930), and the Meixner-Pollaczek polynomials.

== Education and career ==
Pollaczek studied at the Technical University of Vienna, got a M.Sc. in electrical engineering from Technical University of Brno (1920), and his Ph.D. in mathematics from University of Berlin (1922) with a dissertation titled Über die Kreiskörper der l-ten und l^{2}-ten Einheitswurzeln, advised by Issai Schur and based on results published first in 1917.

Pollaczek was employed by AEG in Berlin (1921–23), and later worked for Reichspost (1923–33). In 1933, he was fired because he was Jewish. He moved to Paris, where he was consulting teletraffic engineer to various institutions from 1933 onwards, including the Société d'Études pour Liaisons Téléphoniques et Télégraphiques (SELT) and the French National Centre for Scientific Research (CNRS).

In 1977, Pollaczek was awarded the John von Neumann Theory Prize, although his age prevented him from receiving the prize in person. He was posthumously elected to the 2002 class of Fellows of the Institute for Operations Research and the Management Sciences.

== Personal life ==
He married mathematician Hilda Geiringer in 1921, and they had a child, Magda, in 1922. However, their marriage did not last, and Magda was brought up by Hilda. Pollaczek became physicist László Tisza's father-in-law due to Magda's marriage.
