= Josef Meixner =

German theoretical physicist

- Born: 24 April 1908; Percha, Kingdom of Bavaria, German Empire
- Died: 19 March 1994 (aged 85); Aachen, Germany
- Education: Ludwig-Maximilians-Universität München
- Known for: Meixner distribution; Meixner polynomials; Meixner–Pollaczek polynomials
- Scientific career
- Fields: Physics
- Workplaces: University of Giessen; Humboldt University of Berlin; RWTH Aachen University
- Thesis: Die Greensche Funktion des wellenmechanischen Keplerproblems (1931)
- Doctoral advisor: Arnold Sommerfeld

Josef Meixner (24 April 1908 – 19 March 1994) was a German theoretical physicist, known for his work on the physics of deformable bodies, thermodynamics, statistical mechanics, Meixner polynomials, Meixner–Pollaczek polynomials, and spheroidal wave functions.

== Education ==
Meixner began his studies in theoretical physics with Arnold Sommerfeld at the Ludwig-Maximilians-Universität München in 1926. He was awarded his doctorate in 1931, with the submission of a thesis on the application of the Green function in quantum mechanics.

== Career ==
Meixner taught at a high school for a few years. He was an assistant at the Institute of Theoretical Physics in Munchen until 1934. He worked with Salomon Bochner to determine that the Hermite polynomials were the only orthogonal polynomials $p_n(x)$ with generating functions of the form $f(t)e^{xt} = \sum_{n=0}^{\infty}p_n(x)\frac{t^n}{n!}$.

Meixner later wrote in his personal memoirs about his close friend, an Austrian Jew who came to Munich in 1929 and left for Princeton in 1933:

Bochner foresaw the coming political development very clearly, and I recall when we, surely at the end of 1932, stood before a bulletin board of the Voelkischer Beobachter and he said: ‘Now it is almost time that I must depart’. When I [at age 24] replied that then I would also like to leave, he replied: You remain here; nothing will happen to you and for us there are too few places in the world.

Meixner loosened the condition on the generating function and determined that $f(t)e^{xu(t)} = \sum_{n=0}^{\infty}p_n(x)\frac{t^n}{n!}$ was satisfied by five classes of polynomials, known as the Hermite polynomials, Charlier polynomials, Laguerre polynomials, Meixner polynomials and Meixner-Pollaczek polynomials. He published this result in 1934.

In 1934, Meixner became an Assistant in theoretical physics to Karl Bechert at the University of Giessen. Also in 1934, he joined the Nazi paramilitary SA. In 1937, he became a Lecturer and also joined the Nazi party. From 1939 to 1941 he was a lecturer at the Humboldt University of Berlin. Serving in the German army, from September 1941 he was stationed at the weather station at Vadsø, Finnmark, Norway.

In 1942, he was appointed “Extraordinary” Professor of theoretical physics and Director of the Institute of Theoretical Physics at the RWTH Aachen University in Germany. However, he could not take up this position until he was released from the armed forces in the summer of 1943. Meixner received a denazification certificate (Persilschein) with the help of his PhD advisor Sommerfeld, one of the few German scientists untainted with Nazi affiliation, who wrote that Meixner had never been a supporter of the Nazi system but in his circumstances it would have been very difficult for him to avoid joining the SA. Meixner was promoted to “Ordinary” Professor in 1949.

After Sommerfeld's death in 1951, Meixner edited a volume and new editions of two other volumes of Sommerfeld's six-volume Vorlesungen über theoretische Physik.

Meixner conducted research and taught graduate courses at the Institut für theoretische Physik of the RWTH Aachen University. Literature citations, as well as doctorates granted to his students, put Meixner at RWTH Aachen University, or just Aachen, for years in each of the decades from the 1950s until his death in 1994. He was known for his work on the physics of deformable bodies (rheology), thermodynamics, statistical mechanics, Meixner polynomials, Meixner-Pollaczek polynomials, and spheroidal wave functions.

== Selected Literature ==
- Meixner, J. (1933). "Die Greensche Funktion des wellenmechanischen Keplerproblems". Mathematische Zeitschrift. 36 (1): 677–707. doi:10.1007/BF01188644. S2CID 121262754.. This is Meixner's doctoral thesis at Munich, submitted for publication 14 July 1931.
- Meixner, J. (1954). "On the Thermodynamic Theory of the Second Viscosity". Proceedings of the Royal Society of London. Series A, Mathematical and Physical Sciences. 226 (1164): 51–56. Bibcode:1954RSPSA.226...51M. doi:10.1098/rspa.1954.0234. S2CID 120511525.
- Meixner, J. (1973). "The entropy problem in thermodynamics of processes". Rheologica Acta. 12 (3): 465–467. Bibcode:1973AcRhe..12..465M. doi:10.1007/BF01503000. S2CID 95098328.. Meixner is cited as being at the Institut für theoretische Physik, RWTH Aachen. Received: 27 October 1972.
- Meixner, J. (1982). "Constitutive equations of the differential type as approximations". Rheologica Acta. 21 (4–5): 398–399. Bibcode:1982AcRhe..21..398M. doi:10.1007/BF01534300.. Meixner is cited as being at the Institut für Theoretische Physik, Rhein.-Westf. Technische Hochschule Aachen, Germany. Received: 19 May 1982.

== Books ==
- J. Meixner and F. W. Schäfke Mathieusche Funktionen und Sphäroidfunktionen (Springer-Verlag, 1954)
  - J. Meixner, F. W. Schäfke, and G. Wolf Mathieu functions and spheroidal functions and their mathematical foundations: further studies (Springer-Verlag, 1980)
- J. Meixner, editor Statistical Mechanics of Equilibrium and Non-equilibrium Proceedings of the International Symposium on Statistical Mechanics and Thermodynamics held June 15–20, 1964, in Aachen, Germany. (North-Holland Publishing Co., 1965)

== Edited books ==
- Sommerfeld, Arnold Vorlesungen über theoretische Physik. Band 5: Thermodynamik und Statistik. Herausgegeben von Fritz Bopp und Josef Meixner. (Diederich, 1952)
- Sommerfeld, Arnold Vorlesungen über theoretische Physik. Band 2: Optik. 2. Auflage, bearbeitet und ergänzt von Fritz Bopp und Josef Meixner. (Akademische Verlagsgesellschaft, 1959)
- Sommerfeld, Arnold Vorlesungen über theoretische Physik. Band 3: Elektrodynamik. 3. Auflage, bearbeitet und ergänzt von Fritz Bopp und Josef Meixner. (Akademische Verlagsgesellschaft, 1961)
