= Arthur March =

Austrian physicist (1891-1957)

- Born: 23 February 1891; Brixen, Austria-Hungary
- Died: 17 April 1957 (aged 66); Bern, Switzerland
- Education: University of Innsbruck
- Scientific career
- Fields: Physics
- Workplaces: University of Innsbruck
- Doctoral advisor: Ottokar Tumlirz
- Doctoral students: Fritz Sauter

Arthur March (23 February 1891 – 17 April 1957) was an Austrian physicist.

From 1909, he studied mathematics and physics at the University of Innsbruck, the Ludwig-Maximilians-Universität München, and the University of Vienna, obtaining his doctorate in 1913. In 1917, he obtained his habilitation, and in 1928 became an associate professor at the University of Innsbruck. From 1934 to 1936, he was a visiting professor at the University of Oxford, afterwards returning to the University of Innsbruck as a full professor of theoretical physics.

March is known for his research in the field of quantum mechanics. One of his more intriguing projects involved finding the smallest space-time distance.

== Personal life ==
Arthur March married Hildegunde March. He was also friend with Erwin Schrödinger, who had an affair and ended up having a daughter with March's wife.

== Written works ==
- Theorie der Strahlung und der Quanten, 1919 - Theory of radiation and quantum.
- Die Grundlagen der Quantenmechanik, 1931 - The foundation of quantum mechanics.
- Einführung in die moderne Atomphysik, 1933 - Introduction to modern atomic physics.
- Der Weg des Universums, Bern 1948.
- Natur und Erkenntnis in der Konstruktion des heutigen Physikers, 1948.
- "Quantum mechanics of particles and wave fields", 1951.
- "The new world of physics", 1962 (with Ira M. Freeman); based on Das neue Denken der modernen Physik, 1957, (second edition- 1967).
