= Elmar Zeitler =

German physicist (1927–2020)

- Born: 12 March 1927; Würzburg
- Died: 19 December 2020 (aged 93); Berlin
- Education: University of Würzburg
- Known for: Quantitative Electron Microscopy
- Awards: Distinguished Scientist, EMSA (1989)
- Scientific career
- Fields: Electron microscopy
- Workplaces: Bayer Leverkusen; Karolinska Institutet; Walter Reed Army Medical Center; University of Chicago; Fritz Haber Institute
- Doctoral advisor: Helmuth Kulenkampff

Elmar Zeitler (12 March 1927 – 19 December 2020) was a German physicist.

== Academic career ==
After his service within German Luftwaffe and American prisoner of war, Zeitler studied physics in his hometown Würzburg. The advisor of his dissertation "Investigation about the hard component of cosmic rays" was Helmuth Kulenkampff. After working in chemical industry (Bayer Leverkusen) 1954–58, he started to work on the quantitative aspects of electron microscopy during a stay at the Department for Cell Research and Genetics at the Karolinska Institutet in Stockholm under the direction of Torbjörn Caspersson in 1958. Together with Günter Bahr, he was the first to publish about the determination of molecular weight by using electron microscopy. This was followed by his habilitation in Würzburg. At the same time, he gave the lecture "Physics for Medical Students". The quantitative electron microscopy remained the main topic of his research, which he continued at the Biophysical Department of the Walter Reed Army Medical Center in Washington, DC. In 1964, he organized a symposium about "Quantitative Electron Microscopy" together with G. Bahr. This event was essential in the establishment of that research field. In 1968, he followed a call to a professorship at the University of Chicago, Department of Physics and Department of Biophysics. In 1977, he was appointed Scientific Member of the Max Planck Society and Director at Fritz Haber Institute in succession of Ernst Ruska. He remained in this position until his retirement in 1995. At the Fritz-Haber-Institute, he especially promoted the work of his staff in the areas of Quantitative Electron Microscopy (M. van Heel), cryo-electron microscopy with a supra-conducting lens (F. Zemlin), photoelectron microscopy (W. Engel), and electron energy loss spectroscopy (D. Krahl).

Beside these activities, he was Honorary Professor at the Technische Universität Berlin (1975-1995), Founding Editor of the Journal Ultramicroscopy with North-Holland Publishing Company (Elsevier), and Honorary Member in numerous international organizations about electron microscopy. He served as President of the International Federation of Societies for Electron Microscopy (IFSEM) 1982–1984. In 1989, he received the honor of Distinguished Scientist from the Electron Microscopy Society of America (EMSA).

He was a fellow of the Norwegian Academy of Science and Letters from 1995. Zeitler was author of about 200 scientific publications.
