= Meixner–Pollaczek polynomials =

In mathematics, the Meixner–Pollaczek polynomials are a family of orthogonal polynomials P^{(λ)}_{n}(x,φ) introduced by Meixner (1934), which up to elementary changes of variables are the same as the Pollaczek polynomials P^{λ}_{n}(x,a,b) rediscovered by Pollaczek (1949) in the case λ=1/2, and later generalized by him.

They are defined by

$$P_n^{(\lambda)}(x;\phi) = \frac{(2\lambda)_n}{n!}e^{in\phi}{}_2F_1\left(\begin{array}{c} -n,~\lambda+ix\\ 2\lambda \end{array}; 1-e^{-2i\phi}\right)$$
$$P_n^{\lambda}(\cos \phi;a,b) = \frac{(2\lambda)_n}{n!}e^{in\phi}{}_2F_1\left(\begin{array}{c}-n,~\lambda+i(a\cos \phi+b)/\sin \phi\\ 2\lambda \end{array};1-e^{-2i\phi}\right)$$

== Examples ==
The first few Meixner–Pollaczek polynomials are

$$P_0^{(\lambda)}(x;\phi)=1$$
$$P_1^{(\lambda)}(x;\phi)=2(\lambda\cos\phi + x\sin\phi)$$
$$P_2^{(\lambda)}(x;\phi)=x^2+\lambda^2+(\lambda^2+\lambda-x^2)\cos(2\phi)+(1+2\lambda)x\sin(2\phi).$$

== Properties ==
=== Orthogonality ===
The Meixner–Pollaczek polynomials P_{m}^{(λ)}(x;φ) are orthogonal on the real line with respect to the weight function

$$w(x; \lambda, \phi)= |\Gamma(\lambda+ix)|^2 e^{(2\phi-\pi)x}$$

and the orthogonality relation is given by

$$\int_{-\infty}^{\infty}P_n^{(\lambda)}(x;\phi)P_m^{(\lambda)}(x;\phi)w(x; \lambda, \phi)dx=\frac{2\pi\Gamma(n+2\lambda)}{(2\sin\phi)^{2\lambda}n!}\delta_{mn},\quad \lambda>0,\quad 0<\phi<\pi.$$

=== Recurrence relation ===
The sequence of Meixner–Pollaczek polynomials satisfies the recurrence relation

$$(n+1)P_{n+1}^{(\lambda)}(x;\phi)=2\bigl(x\sin\phi + (n+\lambda)\cos\phi\bigr)P_n^{(\lambda)}(x;\phi)-(n+2\lambda-1)P_{n-1}(x;\phi).$$

=== Rodrigues formula ===
The Meixner–Pollaczek polynomials are given by the Rodrigues-like formula

$$P_n^{(\lambda)}(x;\phi)=\frac{(-1)^n}{n!\,w(x;\lambda,\phi)}\frac{d^n}{dx^n}w\left(x;\lambda+\tfrac12n,\phi\right),$$

where w(x;λ,φ) is the weight function given above.

=== Generating function ===
The Meixner–Pollaczek polynomials have the generating function

$$\sum_{n=0}^{\infty}t^n P_n^{(\lambda)}(x;\phi) = (1-e^{i\phi}t)^{-\lambda+ix}(1-e^{-i\phi}t)^{-\lambda-ix}.$$

== See also ==
- Sieved Pollaczek polynomials
