= Sieved orthogonal polynomials =

In mathematics, sieved orthogonal polynomials are orthogonal polynomials whose recurrence relations are formed by sieving the recurrence relations of another family; in other words, some of the recurrence relations are replaced by simpler ones. The first examples were the sieved ultraspherical polynomials introduced by Waleed Al-Salam, W. R. Allaway, and Richard Askey (1984). Mourad Ismail later studied sieved orthogonal polynomials in a long series of papers. Other families of sieved orthogonal polynomials that have been studied include sieved Pollaczek polynomials, and sieved Jacobi polynomials.
