= Sieved Pollaczek polynomials =

In mathematics, sieved Pollaczek polynomials are a family of sieved orthogonal polynomials, introduced by Ismail (1985). Their recurrence relations are a modified (or "sieved") version of the recurrence relations for Pollaczek polynomials.
