= Quantum Boltzmann equation =

The quantum Boltzmann equation, also known as the Uehling–Uhlenbeck equation, is the quantum mechanical modification of the Boltzmann equation, which gives the nonequilibrium time evolution of a gas of quantum-mechanically interacting particles. Typically, the quantum Boltzmann equation is given as only the "collision term" of the full Boltzmann equation, giving the change of the momentum distribution of a locally homogeneous gas, but not the drift and diffusion in space. It was originally formulated by L.W. Nordheim (1928), and by and E. A. Uehling and George Uhlenbeck (1933).

In full generality (including the p-space and x-space drift terms, which are often neglected) the equation is represented analogously to the Boltzmann equation.
$$\left[\frac{\partial}{\partial t} + \mathbf{v} \cdot \nabla_x + \mathbf{F} \cdot \nabla_p \right] f(\mathbf{x},\mathbf{p},t) = \mathcal{Q}[f](\mathbf{x},\mathbf{p})$$

where $\mathbf{F}$ represents an externally applied potential acting on the gas' p-space distribution and $\mathcal{Q}$ is the collision operator, accounting for the interactions between the gas particles. The quantum mechanics must be represented in the exact form of $\mathcal{Q}$, which depends on the physics of the system to be modeled.

== Quantum-statistical collision term ==
For a dilute gas of identical particles undergoing binary elastic collisions, the defining difference from the classical Boltzmann equation lies in the collision operator. One common form of the Uehling–Uhlenbeck collision operator is

$$\mathcal{Q}_q(f)(v)
=
\int_{\mathbb{R}^{d_v}}
\int_{S^{d_v-1}}
B(v-v_*,\omega)
\left[
f'f_*'(1\pm\theta_0 f)(1\pm\theta_0 f_*)
-
ff_*(1\pm\theta_0 f')(1\pm\theta_0 f_*')
\right]
\,d\omega\,dv_* ,$$

where $f=f(v)$ and $f_*=f(v_*)$ are the occupation distributions before a collision, $f'=f(v')$ and $f_*'=f(v_*')$ are those after the collision, $B$ is the collision kernel, and $\theta_0$ sets the scale of the quantum-statistical correction. The upper sign applies to bosons and the lower sign to fermions.

The factors $1+\theta_0 f$ for bosons enhance scattering into already occupied states, whereas the factors $1-\theta_0 f$ for fermions suppress scattering into occupied states in accordance with the Pauli exclusion principle. Thus the same collision structure incorporates Bose–Einstein statistics and Fermi–Dirac statistics. In the classical limit $\theta_0\to 0$, these factors approach unity and the collision operator reduces to the classical Boltzmann collision operator. The operator conserves particle number, momentum and energy and satisfies a quantum version of the H-theorem; its equilibrium distribution is Bose–Einstein for bosons and Fermi–Dirac for fermions.

The quantum Boltzmann equation gives irreversible behavior, and therefore an arrow of time; that is, after a long enough time it gives an equilibrium distribution which no longer changes. Although quantum mechanics is microscopically time-reversible, the quantum Boltzmann equation gives irreversible behavior because phase information is discarded only the average occupation number of the quantum states is kept. The solution of the quantum Boltzmann equation is therefore a good approximation to the exact behavior of the system on time scales short compared to the Poincaré recurrence time, which is usually not a severe limitation, because the Poincaré recurrence time can be many times the age of the universe even in small systems.

The quantum Boltzmann equation has been verified by direct comparison to time-resolved experimental measurements, and in general has found much use in semiconductor optics. For example, the energy distribution of a gas of excitons as a function of time (in picoseconds), measured using a streak camera, has been shown to approach an equilibrium Maxwell-Boltzmann distribution.

== Applications ==
=== Application to semiconductor physics ===
A typical model of a semiconductor may be built on the assumptions that:

1. The electron distribution is spatially homogeneous to a reasonable approximation (so all x-dependence may be suppressed)
2. The external potential is a function only of position and isotropic in p-space, and so $\mathbf{F}$ may be set to zero without losing any further generality
3. The gas is sufficiently dilute that three-body interactions between electrons may be ignored.

Considering the exchange of momentum $\mathbf{q}$ between electrons with initial momenta $\mathbf{k}$ and $\mathbf{k_1}$, it is possible to derive the expression
$$\begin{aligned}
\mathcal{Q}[f](\mathbf{k})
&= \frac{-2}{\hbar (2\pi)^5}\int d\mathbf{q} \int d\mathbf{k_1}
|\hat{v}(\mathbf{q})|^2 \\
&\quad\times
\delta\!\left(\frac{\hbar^2}{2m}(|\mathbf{k-q}|^2+|\mathbf{k_1+q}|^2-\mathbf{k}_1^2-\mathbf{k}^2)\right)
\\
&\quad\times \left[f_{\mathbf{k}} f_{\mathbf{k_1}} (1-f_{\mathbf{k-q}})(1-f_{\mathbf{k_1+q}})
- f_{\mathbf{k-q}} f_{\mathbf{k_1+q}} (1-f_{\mathbf{k}})(1-f_{\mathbf{k_1}})\right]
\end{aligned}$$

=== Phonon–phonon scattering ===
Phonon–phonon scattering, governed by anharmonic lattice interactions, thermalizes the phonon population on timescales of tens to hundreds of picoseconds and is the principal mechanism of thermal resistance in insulators and semiconductors. In this context, the time-depended quantum Boltzmann equation is also known as the Peierls-Boltzmann equation. The underlying Hamiltonian is written in second quantization as follows:

$\hat{\mathcal{H}}_{\text{anh}} = \frac{1}{3!} \sum_{\mathbf{q}\nu,\,\mathbf{q}'\nu',\,\mathbf{q}''\nu''} \Psi_{\mathbf{q}\nu,\mathbf{q}'\nu',\mathbf{q}''\nu''} \left(\hat{a}^{\dagger}_{\mathbf{q}\nu} - \hat{a}_{-\mathbf{q}\nu}\right) \left(\hat{a}^{\dagger}_{\mathbf{q}'\nu'} - \hat{a}_{-\mathbf{q}'\nu'}\right) \left(\hat{a}^{\dagger}_{\mathbf{q}''\nu''} - \hat{a}_{-\mathbf{q}''\nu''}\right)$

where $\hat{a}^{\dagger}_{\mathbf{q}\nu}$ and $\hat{a}_{\mathbf{q}\nu}$ are phonon creation and annihilation operators. The coupling coefficient $\Psi_{\mathbf{q}\nu,\mathbf{q}'\nu',\mathbf{q}''\nu''}$ is constructed from the third-order interatomic force constants (IFCs) $\Phi^{\alpha\beta\gamma}_{0b,\,nb',\,mb''}$, which give the change in force on atom $b$ in the unit cell along direction $\alpha$ due to simultaneous displacements of atoms $b'$ and $b''$ in unit cells $n$ and $m$ along directions $\beta$ and $\gamma$.

After Fourier transformation and projection onto phonon polarization vectors $e^{\alpha}_{b,\mathbf{q}\nu}$, one obtains

$$\Psi_{\mathbf{q}\nu,\mathbf{q}'\nu',\mathbf{q}''\nu''} =
\frac{i}{\sqrt{V}}\,\delta_{\mathbf{G},\,\mathbf{q}+\mathbf{q}'+\mathbf{q}''}
\sum_{b,b',b''}
\sqrt{\frac{\hbar^3}{m_b m_{b'} m_{b''}\,\omega_{\mathbf{q}\nu}\,\omega_{\mathbf{q}'\nu'}\,\omega_{\mathbf{q}''\nu''}}}
\;e^{\alpha}_{b,\mathbf{q}\nu}\,e^{\beta}_{b',\mathbf{q}'\nu'}\,e^{\gamma}_{b'',\mathbf{q}''\nu''}
\;\Phi^{\alpha\beta\gamma}_{\mathbf{q}b,\mathbf{q}'b',\mathbf{q}''b''}$$

where $V$ is the crystal volume, $m_b$ is the mass of atom $b$, and the Kronecker delta $\delta_{\mathbf{G},\,\mathbf{q}+\mathbf{q}'+\mathbf{q}''}$ enforces crystal momentum conservation modulo a reciprocal lattice vector $\mathbf{G}$.

Applying Fermi's golden rule to $\hat{\mathcal{H}}_{\text{anh}}$ yields the phonon–phonon collision term. For a phonon mode $(\mathbf{q},\nu)$, three distinct three-phonon processes govern the time-evolution of the phonon occupation number:

$$\dot{n}_{\mathbf{q}\nu}\big|_{\text{ph-ph}} = -\frac{2\pi}{\hbar^2}
\sum_{\mathbf{k}\lambda,\,\mathbf{k}'\lambda'}
\left|\Psi_{\mathbf{q}\nu,\mathbf{k}\lambda,\mathbf{k}'\lambda'}\right|^2
\Big[\,\mathcal{D}^{-}(\mathbf{q}\nu;\mathbf{k}\lambda,\mathbf{k}'\lambda')
+ \mathcal{D}^{+}(\mathbf{q}\nu;\mathbf{k}\lambda,\mathbf{k}'\lambda')
+ \mathcal{D}^{+}(\mathbf{q}\nu;\mathbf{k}'\lambda',\mathbf{k}\lambda)\,\Big]$$

where the three terms correspond to distinct scattering channels. The process, in which one phonon decays into two,

$$\mathcal{D}^{-} = \left[n_{\mathbf{q}\nu}(n_{\mathbf{k}\lambda}+1)(n_{\mathbf{k}'\lambda'}+1)
- (n_{\mathbf{q}\nu}+1)\,n_{\mathbf{k}\lambda}\,n_{\mathbf{k}'\lambda'}\right]
\delta(\omega_{\mathbf{q}\nu} - \omega_{\mathbf{k}\lambda} - \omega_{\mathbf{k}'\lambda'})$$

and the coalescence process, in which two phonons merge into one,

$$\mathcal{D}^{+} = \left[n_{\mathbf{q}\nu}\,n_{\mathbf{k}\lambda}(n_{\mathbf{k}'\lambda'}+1)
- (n_{\mathbf{q}\nu}+1)(n_{\mathbf{k}\lambda}+1)\,n_{\mathbf{k}'\lambda'}\right]
\delta(\omega_{\mathbf{q}\nu} + \omega_{\mathbf{k}\lambda} - \omega_{\mathbf{k}'\lambda'})$$

In each case the delta function enforces energy conservation, and the occupation-number prefactors respect Bose-Einstein statistics. The third term in is the time-reverse of the coalescence process.

=== Electron-phonon dynamics ===
Ultrafast dynamics simulations based on the time-dependend Boltzmann equation, parameterized from ab initio, have been widely used to describe non-equilibrium processes involving electrons and phonons in condensed matter physics. Applications include the investigation of the thermalization of electrons and phonons following photoirradiation, and the framework has since been extended to ultrafast magnetization dynamics in photo-excited ferromagnets.

== Ab initio inputs ==
Although the quantum Boltzmann equation is semi-classical in nature — specifying the occupations (of e.g. electrons, phonons, and magnons) rather than tracking individual particle trajectories — its scattering rates can be parameterized from first-principles calculations within a fully quantum mechanical framework.

In the case of phonon-phonon scattering, the ab initio input data are the third-order IFCs $\Phi^{\alpha\beta\gamma}$. They are computed from density functional perturbation theory (DFPT) or by finite differences of the second-order force constants.

Codes such as ShengBTE use this approach to compute lattice thermal conductivity from first principles.
