= Edward Ramberg =

Italian-American physicist (1907–1995)

Edward Granville Ramberg (June 14, 1907 – January 9, 1995) was an Italian-American physicist who contributed to the early development of electron microscopy and color television. He was the uncle of Mario Capecchi, a 2007 Nobel laureate.

== Life and education ==
Ramberg was born in Florence, Italy to American painter, Lucy Ramberg (née Dodd), and father Walter Gustave Ramberg a German archaeologist. Ramberg and his family (he had two older siblings, Walter Gustav Charles Ramberg and Lucy Elizabeth Ramberg) lived in a villa in Florence until the outbreak of World War I putting Germany and Italy on different sides. The family evacuated to Munich where the father was drafted into the German army and was killed in action. After the war, the mother took the family to her family home in Portland, Oregon but she and her daughter returned to the family villa in Florence as Europe returned to normal after the war.

While in Portland, Ramberg graduated from Lincoln High School in 1922. That year he enrolled in Reed College, but two years later he transferred to Cornell University where he was joined by his older brother returning from Europe. During the years 1925 to 1927, he took a hiatus and worked for Bausch & Lomb on optical computing. Upon receipt of his bachelor's degree from Cornell in 1928, he stayed at the university to work with Floyd K. Richtmyer. In 1930, Ramberg went to study with Arnold Sommerfeld at the Ludwig-Maximilians-Universität München. He was granted his Ph.D. in 1932.

Edward and his wife (Sarah) were Quakers and, for that reason, during World War II, he did alternative services that include: working at a mental institution, clearing swamps and served for testing vaccines against tropical diseases. After the war, his sister and her 9-year-old son Mario Capecchi returned from Europe, and the Ramberg's took charge of Mario's education.

== Career ==
Upon return to the United States from Munich, Ramberg returned to Cornell and continued the work on which he based his thesis: X-ray satellites and line widths. In 1935, he left Cornell to take a position at RCA to work on both theoretical and experimental work on secondary emission, pickup tubes, and field electron emission. He later took part in the development of the theory of thermoelectric refrigeration and image tube aberrations and in demonstrating the mathematical operability of a multistage electrostatic electron multiplier. He also took part in construction of one of the first electron microscopes in the mid-1940s. He remained at RCA until 1972.

In addition to working at RCA, he was a visiting professor at the Ludwig-Maximilians-Universität München in 1949 and, he was a Fulbright lecturer at the Technische Hochschule Darmstadt 1960-1961. In addition to co-authoring a number of books, he also translated Electrodynamik, Arnold Sommerfeld's third volume in his six-volume Lectures on Theoretical Physics.

== Awards ==
- 1957 – Elected a Fellow of the American Physical Society
- 1964 – David Sarnoff Outstanding Team Award in Science from RCA
- 1972 – David Sarnoff Award (co-sponsored by RCA and the Institute of Electrical and Electronics Engineers) for his work on electron optics, electron physics, and television.
- 1989 – Karl Ferdinand Braun Prize from the Society for Information Display
- Fellow of the Institute of Radio Engineers
- Fellow of the American Physical Society

== Selected Literature ==
- Arnold Sommerfeld and E. Ramberg Das Drehmoment eines permanenten Magneten im Felde eines permeablen Mediums, Annalen der Physik 8 46-54 (1950) as cited in Sommerfeld Bibliography – Sommerfeld Project.

== Books ==
- V. K. Zworykin and E. G. Ramberg Photoelectricity And Its Application (John Wiley and Sons, 1934)
- E. E. Zworykin, G. A. Morton, E. G. Ramberg, J. Hillier, and A. W. Vance Electron Optics and the Electron Microscope (John Wiley & Sons, 1945)
- Arnold Sommerfeld, translated from the German by Edward G. Ramberg Electrodynamics - Lectures on Theoretical Physics Volume III (Academic Press, 1952)
- V. K. Zworykin, E. G. Ramberg, and L. E. Flory Television in Science and Industry (John Wiley and Sons, 1958)
- A. M. Morell and E. G. Ramberg Color Television Picture Tubes (Academic Press, 1974)
