= Vacuum polarization =

Gauge boson self-energy due to interactions with virtual particles

In quantum field theory, and specifically quantum electrodynamics, vacuum polarization describes a process in which a background electromagnetic field produces virtual electron–positron pairs that change the distribution of charges and currents that generated the original electromagnetic field. It is also sometimes referred to as the self-energy of the gauge boson (photon). It is analogous to the electric polarization of dielectric materials, but in vacuum without the need of a medium.

The effects of vacuum polarization have been routinely observed experimentally since then as very well-understood background effects. Vacuum polarization, referred to below as the one loop contribution, occurs with leptons (electron–positron pairs) or quarks. (Note: Vacuum polarization affecting spin interactions has also been reported based on experimental data and also treated theoretically in quantum chromodynamics, as for example in considering the hadron spin structure.)

== History ==
Vacuum polarization was first discussed in papers by Paul Dirac and Werner Heisenberg in 1934.

After developments in radar equipment for World War II resulted in higher accuracy for measuring the energy levels of the hydrogen atom, Willis Lamb made measurements of the Lamb shift and the anomalous magnetic dipole moment of the electron. These effects corresponded to the deviation from the value −2 for the spectroscopic electron g-factor that are predicted by the Dirac equation. Later, Hans Bethe theoretically calculated those shifts in the hydrogen energy levels due to vacuum polarization in 1947, on his return train ride from the Shelter Island Conference to Cornell University.

Effects of vacuum polarization were calculated to first order in the coupling constant by Robert Serber and Edwin Albrecht Uehling in 1935.

The vacuum polarization from leptons was first observed in 1940s but also more recently observed in 1997 using the TRISTAN particle accelerator in Japan, the latter polarization from quarks was observed along with multiple quark–gluon loop contributions from the early 1970s to mid-1990s using the VEPP-2M particle accelerator at the Budker Institute of Nuclear Physics in Siberia, Russia and many other accelerator laboratories worldwide. Vacuum Polarization has also been observed magnetar 1E 1547-5408, causing the polarization to be nearly three times greater than seen in similar magnetars.

== Explanation ==
According to quantum field theory, the vacuum between interacting particles is not simply empty space. Rather, it contains short-lived virtual particle–antiparticle pairs (leptons or quarks and gluons). These short-lived pairs are called vacuum bubbles. It can be shown that they have no measurable impact on any process. (Note: They yield a phase factor to the vacuum to vacuum transition amplitude.)

The ground state of a relativistic quantum system can be considered to consist of virtual particles. In quantum electrodynamics, these particles are pairs of electrons and positrons. A charge $e_0$ in this system polarizes it, rearranging the virtual particles to screen the charge. Far from the charge, the observed charge $e$ will differ by the ratio with the dielectric constant, $\epsilon$ as $e = e_0/\epsilon.$ Thus charge renormalization in QED is vacuum polarization.

Virtual particle–antiparticle pairs can also occur as a photon propagates. In this case, the effect on other processes is measurable. The one-loop contribution of a fermion–antifermion pair to the vacuum polarization is represented by the following diagram:

These particle–antiparticle pairs carry various kinds of charges, such as color charge if they are subject to quantum chromodynamics such as quarks or gluons, or the more familiar electromagnetic charge if they are electrically charged leptons or quarks, the most familiar charged lepton being the electron and since it is the lightest in mass, the most numerous due to the energy–time uncertainty principle as mentioned above; e.g., virtual electron–positron pairs. Such charged pairs act as an electric dipole. In the presence of an electric field, e.g., the electromagnetic field around an electron, these particle–antiparticle pairs reposition themselves, thus partially counteracting the field (a partial screening effect, a dielectric effect). The field therefore will be weaker than would be expected if the vacuum were completely empty. This reorientation of the short-lived particle–antiparticle pairs is referred to as vacuum polarization.

== Electric and magnetic fields ==
Extremely strong electric and magnetic fields cause an excitation of electron–positron pairs. Maxwell's equations are the classical limit of the quantum electrodynamics which cannot be described by any classical theory. A point charge must be modified at extremely small distances less than the reduced Compton wavelength $\bar\lambda_\text{c}$ ($\, = \frac{\hbar}{m c} = 3.86 \times 10^{-13} \text{ m}$). To lowest order in the fine-structure constant, $\alpha$, the QED result for the electrostatic potential of a point charge is:
$$\phi(r) = \frac{q}{4 \pi \epsilon_0 r} \times \begin{cases}
1 - \frac{2 \alpha}{3 \pi} \ln\left( \frac{r}{\bar\lambda_\text{c}}\right)& r \ll \bar\lambda_\text{c} \\[2pt]
1 + \frac{\alpha}{4 \sqrt{\pi}} \left( \frac{r}{\bar\lambda_\text{c}}\right)^{-3/2} e^{-2r/\bar\lambda_\text{c}} & r \gg \bar\lambda_\text{c}
\end{cases}$$

This can be understood as a screening of a point charge by a medium with a dielectric permittivity, which is why the term vacuum polarization is used. When observed from distances much greater than $\bar\lambda_\text{c}$, the charge is renormalized to the finite value $q$. See also the Uehling potential.

The effects of vacuum polarization become significant when the external field approaches the Schwinger limit, which is:
$$E_\text{c} = \frac{ m c^2}{e \bar\lambda_\text{c}} = 1.32 \times 10^{18} \text{ V/m}$$
$$B_\text{c} = \frac{ m c}{e \bar\lambda_\text{c}} = 4.41 \times 10^9 \text{ T} \,.$$

These effects break the linearity of Maxwell's equations and therefore break the superposition principle. The QED result for slowly varying fields can be written in non-linear relations for the vacuum. To lowest order $\alpha$, virtual pair production generates a vacuum polarization and magnetization given by:
$$\mathbf P = \frac{2 \epsilon_0 \alpha}{E_\text{c}^2} \left ( 2 \left( E^2 - c^2 B^2\right) \mathbf E + 7 c^2 \left(\mathbf E \cdot \mathbf B\right) \mathbf B\right )$$
$$\mathbf M = - \frac{2  \alpha}{\mu_0 E_\text{c}^2} \left ( 2 \left( E^2 - c^2 B^2\right) \mathbf E + 7 c^2 \left(\mathbf E \cdot \mathbf B\right) \mathbf B \right ).$$

As of 2019, this polarization and magnetization has not been directly measured.

== Vacuum polarization tensor ==
The vacuum polarization is quantified by the self-energy or vacuum polarization tensor Π^{μν}(p) which describes the dielectric effect as a function of the four-momentum p carried by the photon. Thus the vacuum polarization depends on the momentum transfer, or in other words, the electric constant is scale dependent. In particular, for electromagnetism we can write the fine-structure constant as an effective momentum-transfer-dependent quantity; to first order in the corrections, we have
$$\alpha_\text{eff}(p^2) = \frac{\alpha}{1 - [\Pi_2(p^2) - \Pi_2(0)]}$$
where $\Pi^{\mu \nu}(p) =( p^2 g^{\mu\nu} - p^{\mu} p^{\nu})\Pi(p^2)$ and the subscript 2 denotes the leading order-e^{2} correction. The tensor structure of Π^{μν}(p) is fixed by the Ward identity.

== See also ==
- Polarizability
- Polarization density
- Infraparticle
- Renormalization
- Virtual particles
- QED vacuum
- QCD vacuum
- Schwinger limit
- Schwinger effect
- Uehling potential
- Vacuum birefringence
- Nonoblique correction
