= Edwin Albrecht Uehling =

American theoretical physicist (1901–1985)

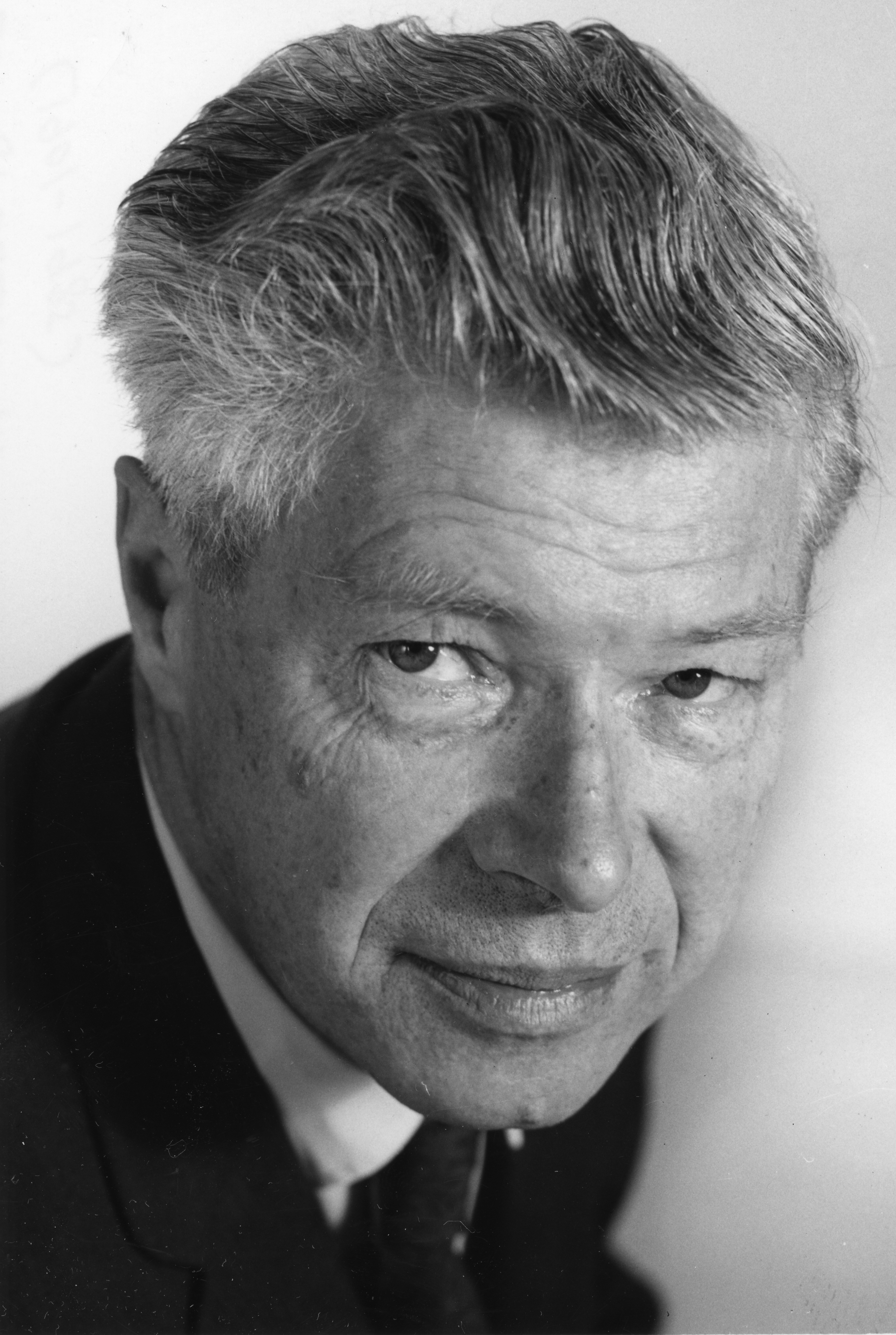
- Born: 27 January 1901; Lowell, Wisconsin, United States
- Died: 18 March 1985 (aged 84)
- Education: University of Michigan
- Known for: Uehling potential Uehling–Uhlenbeck equation Senko–Uehling–Schmidt theory
- Scientific career
- Fields: Quantum field theory
- Workplaces: University of Washington
- Doctoral advisor: George Uhlenbeck

Edwin Albrecht Uehling (January 27, 1901 – May 18, 1985) was an American theoretical physicist. With George Uhlenbeck, he developed a quantum-statistical extension of the Boltzmann equation for gases obeying Bose–Einstein or Fermi–Dirac statistics, now known as the Uehling–Uhlenbeck equation. He is also known for formulating the Uehling potential, which describes vacuum polarization in quantum electrodynamics. He later worked in condensed matter physics, particularly on ferroelectricity.

== Life ==
After his bachelor's degree from the University of Wisconsin–Madison in 1925, he worked at Bell Telephone Laboratories in radio frequency communication, where he wrote several patents. He received his PhD from the University of Michigan in 1932 on the quantum theory of transport processes, advised by George Uhlenbeck. His research lead to his famous paper on vacuum polarization and the formulation of the now-called Uehling potential. As described by Uehling theory, the effects of vacuum polarization were later confirmed with the discovery of the Lamb shift in 1947.

After his PhD he left for a ten-month collaboration with Werner Heisenberg in the Institute of Theoretical Physics in Leipzig University. When Uehling returned to the United States, he took a position at RCA Laboratories. In 1934, he went to work with J. Robert Oppenheimer in Berkeley and Pasadena funded by the National Research Council.

During World War II, Uehling was recruited as a member of the antisubmarine warfare operations research group of the Tenth Fleet. He was awarded the President's Certificate of Merit by the United States government in early 1947 for his scientific contributions to the team during the war.

Uehling was also interested in condensed matter physics, nuclear magnetic resonance and ferroelectrics. He codeveloped the Senko–Uehling–Schmidt theory (Note: Named after Michael E. Senko, V. Hugo Schmidt and Uehling.) of ferroelectricity to describe monopotassium phosphate (KH_{2}PO_{4}).

He worked in the University of Washington since 1936, he formally retired in 1971, but continued to work as emeritus professor until 1984. He was elected in 1941 a Fellow of the American Physical Society. He was a Guggenheim Fellow for the academic year 1955–1956.

During post-war related tensions and the investigations of espionage related to the Manhattan Project, president of the University of Washington Henry Schmitz denied professorship to Oppenheimer in 1954. Uehling, then the chairman of the physics department, tried various times to revert the president decision. Uehling appealed to the university senate with a speech on academic freedom. The university committee ruled against the university president and Oppenheimer was allowed lectureship. Schmitz later apologized to Oppenheimer in 1956.

== See also ==
- Quantum Boltzmann equation
