= Lectures on Theoretical Physics =

Series of textbooks by Arnold Sommerfeld

- Author: Arnold Sommerfeld
- Original title: Vorlesungen über Theoretische Physik
- Country: Germany
- Language: German
- Discipline: Physics
- Publisher: Academic Press
- Published: 1943–1952
- Published in English: 1949–1964
- Media type: Print
- No. of books: 6

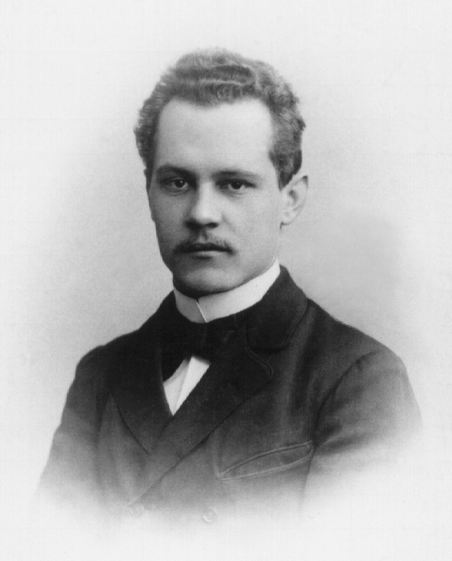
Photo of Sommerfeld in 1897

Lectures on Theoretical Physics is a six-volume series of physics textbooks translated from Arnold Sommerfeld's classic German texts Vorlesungen über Theoretische Physik. The series includes the volumes Mechanics, Mechanics of Deformable Bodies, Electrodynamics, Optics, Thermodynamics and Statistical Mechanics, and Partial Differential Equations in Physics. Focusing on one subject each semester, the lectures formed a three-year cycle of courses that Sommerfeld repeatedly taught at LMU Munich for over thirty years. Sommerfeld's lectures were famous and he was held to be one of the greatest physics lecturers of his time.

== Background ==
Sommerfeld was a well known German theoretical physicist who played a major role in developing old quantum theory. He was renowned as a great teacher of theoretical physics in the early 20th century. Wolfgang Pauli wrote in 1951 that Sommerfeld was "the epitome of the scholar and the teacher". Another physicist, summarizing "the roles of the most important exponents of theoretical physics in its 'golden age'", wrote that "Planck was the authority, Einstein the genius, and Sommerfeld the teacher" in a 1973 biography of Max Planck. Summarizing public reception of Sommerfeld's teaching style, Robert Bruce Lindsay wrote in 1954 that it "is generally admitted that as an effective lecturer Sommerfeld has been rarely if ever surpassed."

The textbooks, originally published in German, were based on series of his lectures, which were made to be self-consistent within each section, at LMU Munich that ran over a three-year cycle. In addition to specialized classes, the set of lectures presented by the book represent Sommerfeld's standard introductory courses in physics that he gave in Munich, with each subject taught over one semester for a total of three years. Sommerfeld continued this cycle of lectures for over thirty years at the university, which were very popular and influential.

In addition to his normal lectures, Sommerfeld also lectured in specialized courses, including courses in atomic physics that form the subject of another of his books: Atomic Structure and Spectral Lines, which was published in 1919. The world-famous textbook is known as the "Bible of atomic physics". His other previous works included another lecture series titled Three lectures on atomic physics, which was published in 1926 by Methuen Publishing. He had also edited the book series Die Theorie des Kreisels, which was based on a set of lectures given by his mentor Felix Klein.

== Volumes ==
There are six volumes to the lecture series, Mechanics, Mechanics of deformable bodies, Electrodynamics, Optics, Thermodynamics and Statistical Mechanics, and Partial Differential Equations in Physics, which all follow a semester course given by Sommerfeld at LMU Munich. Characterizing the series, Rudolf Peierls wrote in 1956 that they exemplify "Sommerfeld's attitude of putting practical problems and their solution above abstract principles, an attitude by its nature closer to Boltzmann than to that of Gibbs."

=== Mechanics ===
Mechanik, the first volume of Sommerfeld's Vorlesungen über Theoretische Physik, was published in 1947 by Akademische Verlagegesellschaft Becker und Erler and subsequently translated into English by Martin O. Stern and published as Mechanics in 1953 by the Academic Press. Paul Peter Ewald wrote a foreword for the English edition where he attempts to summarize Sommerfeld's lecture style and use the information to explain why Sommerfeld had so many successful students.

The book was reviewed by Robert Bruce Lindsay, Rudolf Peierls, William V. Houston, and several others. In his 1954 review of the volume, Lindsay wrote that Sommerfeld's "clarity is indeed remarkably well exemplified" by the mechanics textbook and he praised the book for its "many ingenious comments to help the learner over the rough spots". Lindsay noted regret for the lack of an extended discussion of mass and force in physics before going on to write that the "book can be heartily recommended to all students of physics on the undergraduate senior and elementary graduate levels in American universities".

- Table of contents:
1. Mechanics of a Particle
2. Mechanics of Systems, Principle of Virtual Work, and d'Alembert's Principle
3. Oscillation Problems
4. The Rigid Body
5. Relative Motion
6. Integral Variational Principles of Mechanics and Lagrange's Equations For Generalized Coordinates

=== Mechanics of Deformable Bodies ===
Mechanics of deformable bodies, the second volume of the series, was published in English in 1950 by Academic Press. The book was translated from the German volume Mechanik der deformierbaren Medien by G. Kuerti. The second volume covers topics including hydrodynamics and elasticity, which are discussed together, as well as more advanced topics like supersonic flow and shock waves.

The volume was reviewed by Rudolf Peierls. In his review, Peierls argued that covering hydrodynamics and elastics together allowed for the "general principles" to "be treated in a concise and transparent way". Peierls went on to note that it emphasizes physical principles even to the detriment of its treatment of mathematical techniques. At the end of his review of several of four of the book's volumes, Peierls closed by saying: "To me these volumes represent an almost perfect choice of topics for a basic course on theoretical physics".

- Table of contents:
1. Kinematics of Deformable Bodies
2. Statics of Deformable Bodies
3. Dynamics of Deformable Bodies
4. Vortex Theory
5. Theory of Waves
6. Flow With Given Boundaries
7. Supplementary Notes On Selected Hydrodynamic Problems
8. Supplements To The Theory Of Elasticity

=== Electrodynamics ===
Electrodynamics, published in 1964 by Academic Press, is the third volume of its series and covers topics in electrodynamics. The book was translated from the German volume Elektrodynamik by Edward Ramberg. The book was reviewed by Rudolf Peierls, among several others.

- Table of contents:
1. Fundamentals and Basic Principles of Maxwell's Electrodynamics
2. Derivation of the Phenomena from the Maxwell Equations
3. Theory of Relativity and Electron Theory
4. Maxwell's Theory for Moving Bodies and other Addenda

=== Optics ===
The series' fourth volume, Optics, was published in 1954 by Academic Press after being translated from the German textbook Optik by Otto Laporte and Peter A. Moldauer. The book was reviewed by Karl Meissner, Rudolf Peierls, and several others. Max Born wrote in 1952 that the book gives "a very elegant outline" of Cherenkov radiation. In his 1955 review, Karl Meissner wrote that the book is characteristic of Sommerfeld's lectures, which he summarized as "[c]lear and vivid presentation[s] of the basic ideas" with an "elegance in language and of mathematical developments" and an "emphasis on physics." Peierls called the book "a very welcome addition to the literature" in his 1955 review and he praised the book, like the other lectures, for "the use of powerful mathematical techniques" that are "presented and applied without losing sight of the physical ideas behind them."

- Table of contents:
1. Reflection and Refraction of Light
2. Optics of Moving Media and Sources. Astronomical Topics
3. Theory of Dispersion
4. Crystal Optics
5. The Theory of Diffraction
6. Addenda, Chiefly to the Theory of Diffraction

=== Thermodynamics and Statistical Mechanics ===
Thermodynamik und Statistik, the fifth volume of Sommerfeld's Lectures, was edited by Fritz Bopp and Josef Meixner and published posthumously in 1952 by Dieterich'sche Verlagsbuchhandlung. The book was translated into the English volume Thermodynamics and Statistical Mechanics by Joseph Kestin and published in 1956 by Academic Press. The book was reviewed by Rudolf Peierls and several others. After summarizing the book's contents in his 1956 review of the volume, Peierls wrote, "The book is a welcome addition to the text-books on this subject."

- Table of contents:
1. Thermodynamics. General Considerations
2. The Application of Thermodynamics To Special Systems
3. The Elementary Kinetic Theory of Gases
4. General Statistical Mechanics: Combinatorial Method
5. Outline of an Exact Kinetic Theory of Gases

=== Partial Differential Equations in Physics ===
Partielle Differentialgleichungen in der Physik, the sixth and final volume of its series, was published in 1947 by Dieterich'sche Verlagsbuchhandlung while it was translated to English by Ernst G. Straus and published by Academic Press in 1949 under the title Partial Differential Equations in Physics. The book was reviewed by George F. Carrier, Michael Golomb, Rudolf Peierls, and Lincoln LaPaz. After summarizing the book's contents, Carrier closed his 1952 review by writing: "The book contains an excellent choice of very instructive problems and should be invaluable in teaching the technique of solving the classical type boundary value problems." In his 1950 review, Golomb wrote that the book is "concise and very readable" and that its "chief merit" is "its skillful handling of complex problems". LaPaz gave a critical review going into detail on several issues before summarizing the review himself: "In conclusion, on balancing out the few quite minor imperfections of the book under review against its many excellences, the reader will not hesitate to accord hearty commendation to author, translator and editors alike for tasks exceedingly well done."

- Table of contents:
1. Fourier Series and Integrals
2. Introduction to Partial Differential Equations
3. Boundary Value Problems in Heat Conduction
4. Cylinder and Sphere Problems
5. Eigenfunctions and Eigen Values
6. Problems of Radio

== Publication history ==
=== Original German editions ===
1. Sommerfeld, Arnold (1947). Mechanik [Mechanics]. Vorlesungen über theoretische Physik (in German). Vol. 1. Leipzig: Akademische Verlagegesellschaft Becker and Erler. OCLC 491677632.
2. Sommerfeld, Arnold (1943). Mechanik der deformierbaren Medien [Mechanics of Deformable Bodies]. Vorlesungen über theoretische Physik (in German). Vol. 2. Wiesbaden: Dieterich'sche Verlagsbuchhandlung. OCLC 760037487.
3. Sommerfeld, Arnold (1948). Elektrodynamik [Electrodynamics]. Vorlesungen über theoretische Physik (in German). Vol. 3. Wiesbaden: Dieterich'sche Verlagsbuchhandlung. OCLC 760037491.
4. Sommerfeld, Arnold (1950). Optik [Optics]. Vorlesungen über theoretische Physik (in German). Vol. 4. Wiesbaden: Dieterich'sche Verlagsbuchhandlung. OCLC 450242968.
5. Sommerfeld, Arnold (1952). Bopp, Fritz; Meixner, Josef (eds.). Thermodynamik und Statistik [Thermodynamics and Statistical Mechanics]. Vorlesungen über theoretische Physik (in German). Vol. 5. Wiesbaden: Dieterich'sche Verlagsbuchhandlung. OCLC 602728833.
6. Sommerfeld, Arnold (1947). Partielle Differentialgleichungen der Physik [Partial Differential Equations in Physics]. Vorlesungen über theoretische Physik (in German). Vol. 6. Wiesbaden: Dieterich'sche Verlagsbuchhandlung. OCLC 441643966.

=== Original English translations ===
1. Sommerfeld, Arnold (1952). Mechanics. Lectures on Theoretical Physics. Vol. 1. Translated by Stern, Martin O. (1st ed.). New York: Academic Press. ISBN 0-12-654668-1. OCLC 13466875.
2. Sommerfeld, Arnold (1950). Mechanics of deformable bodies. Lectures on Theoretical Physics. Vol. 2 (1st ed.). New York: Academic Press. ISBN 978-0-12-654650-7. OCLC 610683657.
3. Sommerfeld, Arnold (1964). Electrodynamics. Lectures on Theoretical Physics. Vol. 3. Translated by Ramberg, Edward G. (1st ed.). New York: Academic Press. ISBN 978-0-12-654664-4. OCLC 761255842.
4. Sommerfeld, Arnold (1964). Optics. Lectures on Theoretical Physics. Vol. 4. Translated by Laporte, Otto; Moldauer, Peter A. (1st pbk. ed.). New York: Academic Press. ISBN 978-0-323-15239-6. OCLC 840490686.
5. Sommerfeld, Arnold (1964). Bopp, Fritz; Meixner, Josef (eds.). Thermodynamics and statistical mechanics. Lectures on Theoretical Physics. Vol. 5. Translated by Kestin, Joseph (1st ed.). New York: Academic Press. ISBN 978-0-323-13773-7. OCLC 834542530.
6. Sommerfeld, Arnold (1949). Partial differential equations in physics. Lectures on Theoretical Physics. Vol. 6. Translated by Straus, Ernst G. (1st ed.). New York: Academic Press. ISBN 978-0-12-654658-3. OCLC 339897.

=== eBooks ===
1. Sommerfeld, Arnold (1952). Mechanics. Lectures on Theoretical Physics. Translated by Stern, Martin O. New York: Academic Press. doi:10.1016/C2013-0-07601-3. ISBN 9780126546682 – via ScienceDirect.
2. Sommerfeld, Arnold (1950). Mechanics of deformable bodies. Lectures on Theoretical Physics. New York: Academic Press. doi:10.1016/C2013-0-07598-6. ISBN 9780126546507 – via ScienceDirect.
3. Sommerfeld, Arnold (1964). Electrodynamics. Lectures on Theoretical Physics. Translated by Ramberg, Edward G. New York: Academic Press. doi:10.1016/C2013-0-07600-1. ISBN 9780126546644 – via ScienceDirect.
4. Sommerfeld, Arnold (1964). Optics. Lectures on Theoretical Physics. Translated by Laporte, Otto; Moldauer, Peter A. New York: Academic Press. doi:10.1016/B978-0-12-395500-5.X5001-3. ISBN 9780123955005 – via ScienceDirect.
5. Sommerfeld, Arnold (1956). Bopp, Fritz; Meixner, Josef (eds.). Thermodynamics and statistical mechanics. Lectures on Theoretical Physics. Translated by Kestin, Joseph. New York: Academic Press. doi:10.1016/B978-0-12-654680-4.X5001-0. hdl:2027/mdp.39015035282444. ISBN 9780126546804 – via ScienceDirect.
6. Sommerfeld, Arnold (1964). Partial differential equations in physics. Lectures on Theoretical Physics. Translated by Straus, Ernst G. New York: Academic Press. doi:10.1016/B978-0-12-654658-3.X5001-0. ISBN 9780126546583 – via ScienceDirect.

== See also ==
- Course of Theoretical Physics
- The Feynman Lectures on Physics
- List of textbooks on classical and quantum mechanics
- List of textbooks in thermodynamics and statistical mechanics
- List of textbooks in electromagnetism
