= Finn Ravndal =

Norwegian physicist (born 1942)

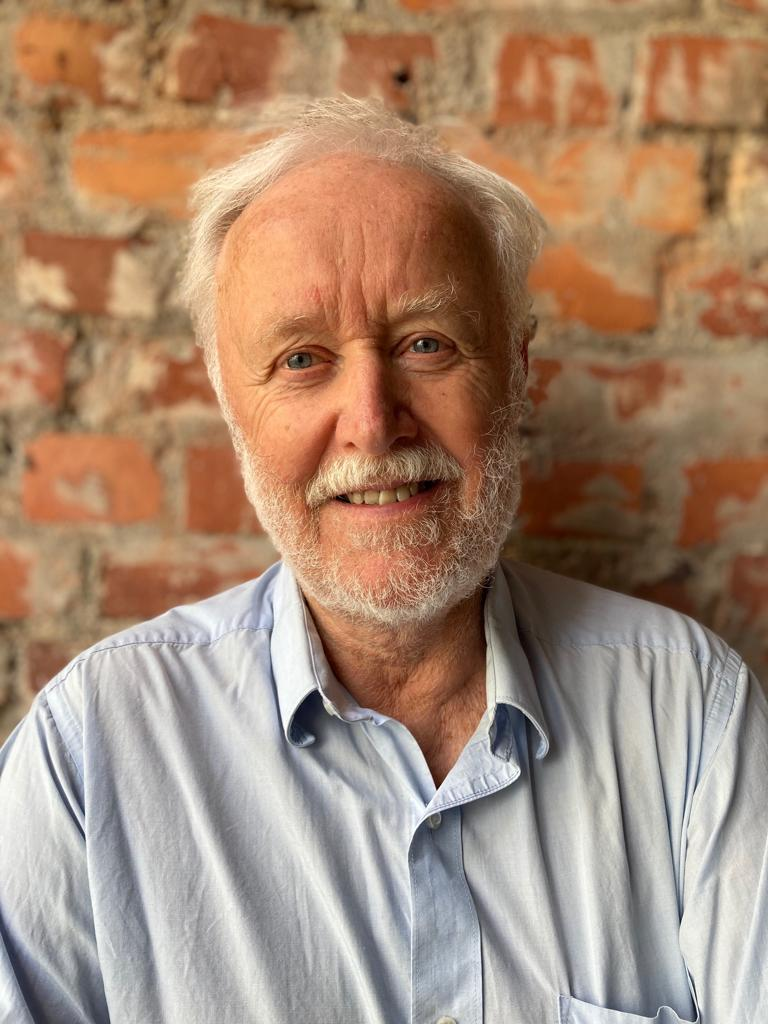
- Born: 24 August 1942 (age 84); Nesna Municipality
- Citizenship: Norwegian
- Education: Caltech
- Awards: Fridtjof Nansen Prize
- Scientific career
- Fields: Theoretical Physics
- Workplaces: University of Oslo

Finn Ravndal (born 1942) is a Norwegian physicist. Ravndal grew up in Molde Municipality in Norway. In 1961 he enrolled at the Norwegian Institute of Technology to study physics (Teknisk Fysikk). In 1966 he completed the degree of sivilingeniør (equivalent to Bachelor of Science) with a dissertation in the area of theoretical physics under the supervision of Harald Wergeland.

During the summer of 1965, he interned at CERN where he worked with an experimental particle physics group to study bubble chamber images for the detection of new elementary particles.

== Education ==
Ravndal received in 1968 a Norwegian doctorate (dr.ing.) in theoretical physics, while completing his national service at Forsvarets forskningsinstitutt, working with the effects of electromagnetic pulses (EMP) from atomic explosions. From 1968, he obtained a position to study at the California Institute of Technology (Caltech). There, in collaboration with Richard Feynman, he developed a relativistic model of quarks which led to the second doctoral degree of Ph.D. in 1971.

== Career ==
Ravndal continued at Caltech for three more years as a postdoctoral researcher. He moved to Nordita in Copenhagen between 1974 and 1976, where his interests shifted to quantum field theory. There he gave a series of lectures on the relatively new topic of the renormalization group, which were widely distributed.

Ravndal taught the first course in general relativity in Norway, but his interests remained in the area of quantum field theory, where he was a formidable pedagog with many research students and broad interests in statistical physics and quantum theory. Together with Alex Hansen, he provided the natural explanation of the Klein paradox by including the effects of antiparticles from the Dirac equation.

In 2012 he retired to the status of professor emeritus, and has made major contributions to the Norwegian Wikipedia in the areas of physics and mathematics.

== Honors and awards ==
In 1976 he was awarded the Fridtjof Nansen prize for young scientists and was awarded tenure as professor of theoretical physics at the University of Oslo, where he remained until retirement.

He is a member of the Norwegian Academy of Science (Det Norske Videnskaps-Akademi) in Oslo the Royal Norwegian Society of Sciences and Letters (Det Kongelige Norske Videnskabers Selskab) in Trondheim.
