= Klein paradox =

Quantum phenomena

In relativistic quantum mechanics, the Klein paradox was an unexpected effect of relativity on the predictions of quantum tunneling theory for particles encountering high potential-energy barriers. The phenomenon itself is now known as Klein tunneling. It is named after physicist Oskar Klein who discovered it in 1929. Originally, Klein obtained a paradoxical result by applying the Dirac equation to the familiar problem of electron scattering from a potential barrier. In nonrelativistic quantum mechanics, electron tunneling into a barrier is observed, with exponential damping. However, Klein's result showed that if the potential is at least of the order of the electron mass $Ve\approx mc^2$ (where V is the electric potential, e is the elementary charge, m is the electron mass and c is the speed of light), the barrier is nearly transparent. Moreover, as the potential approaches infinity, the reflection diminishes and the electron is always transmitted.

The immediate application of the paradox was to Rutherford's proton–electron model for neutral particles within the nucleus, before the discovery of the neutron, which made the model obsolete. The paradox presented a quantum mechanical objection to the notion of an electron confined within a nucleus. This clear and precise paradox suggested that an electron could not be confined within a nucleus by any potential well. The meaning of this paradox was intensely debated by Niels Bohr and others at the time.

For massive particles, the electric field strength required to observe the effect is enormous. The electric potential energy change similar to the rest energy of the incoming particle, $m c^2$, would need to occur over the Compton wavelength of the particle, $\hbar /mc$, which works out to $10^{16}~\text{V}/\text{cm}$ for electrons. For electrons, such extreme fields might only be relevant in $Z>170$ nuclei or evaporation at the event horizon of black holes, but for 2-D quasiparticles at graphene p-n junctions, for which the required electric fields are on the order of $10^5~\text{V}/\text{cm}$, the effect has been studied both theoretically and experimentally.

== History ==
Oskar Klein published the paper describing what later came to be called the Klein paradox in 1929, just as physicists were grappling with two problems: how to combine the theories of relativity and quantum mechanics and how to understand the coupling of matter and light known as electrodynamics.

Klein considered the quantum mechanical problem of free particles striking an electrostatic step potential. When relativity is ignored, this problem has two solutions. One solution applies when the particles approaching the barrier have less kinetic energy than the step: the particles are reflected. If the particles have more energy than the step, some are transmitted past the step, while some are reflected. The ratio of reflection to transmission depends on the energy difference. Relativity adds a third solution: very steep potential steps appear to create particles and antiparticles that then change the calculated ratio of transmission and reflection. In particular, the transmission remains finite even when the potential step is taken to be infinitely large. The one-particle quantum mechanics described by the Schrödinger equation and the Dirac equation cannot describe the creation of particles, which meant a true solution to the problem could not yet be formulated. Before antiparticles were discovered and quantum field theory developed, this third solution was not understood. The puzzle came to be called the Klein paradox.

The paradox raised questions about how relativity was added to quantum mechanics in Dirac's first attempt. It would take the development of the new quantum field theory, originally developed for electrodynamics, to find a complete solution to the problem considered by Klein. Thus the background of the paradox has two threads: the development of quantum mechanics and of quantum electrodynamics.

=== Dirac equation mysteries ===
The Bohr model of the atom published in 1913 assumed that electrons orbited around a compact positively charged nucleus. The success of the Bohr model in predicting atomic spectra suggested that the classical mechanics could not be correct. However, classical electrodynamics predicts that an electron in such an orbit loses energy by emitting light, which would result in the electron's orbit rapidly shrinking before it would collide with the nucleus.

In 1926 Erwin Schrödinger developed a new theory to describe the electron: a quantum mechanical wave equation that reproduced Bohr's results, but solved the aforementioned issue. Schrödinger and other physicists knew, however, that this mechanics was incomplete: it did not include effects of special relativity, nor the interaction of matter and radiation.

Paul Dirac solved the first issue in 1928 with his relativistic quantum theory of the electron. The combination was more accurate and also predicted electron spin. However, it also included twice as many states as expected; these states had negative energies, which was considered unphysical at the time.

Klein found that these extra states caused absurd results from models for electrons striking a large, sharp change in electrostatic potential: a negative current appeared beyond the barrier. Significantly, Dirac's theory only predicted single-particle states. Creation or annihilation of particles could not be correctly analyzed in the single particle theory.

The Klein result was widely discussed immediately after its publication. Niels Bohr thought the result was related to the abrupt step and as a result Arnold Sommerfeld asked Fritz Sauter to investigate sloped steps. Sauter was able to confirm Bohr's conjecture: the paradoxical result only appeared for a step of $\Delta V > 2m c^2$ over a distance similar to the electrons Compton wavelength, $\lambda = h/mc$, about 2 × 10^{−12}m.

Throughout 1929 and 1930, a series of papers by different physicists attempted to understand Dirac's extra states. Hermann Weyl suggested they corresponded to recently discovered protons, the only elementary particle other than the electron known at the time. Dirac pointed out Klein's negative electrons could not convert themselves to positive protons and suggested that the extra states were all filled with electrons already. Then a proton would amount to a missing electron in these lower states. Robert Oppenheimer and separately Igor Tamm showed that this would make atoms unstable. Finally in 1931 Dirac concluded that these states must correspond to a new "anti-electron" particle. In 1932 Carl Anderson experimentally observed these particles, renamed positrons.

=== Positron-electron creation ===
Resolution of the paradox would require quantum field theory, which developed alongside quantum mechanics but at a slower pace due its many complexities. The concept goes back to Max Planck's demonstration that Maxwell's classical electrodynamics, which was so successful in many other applications, failed to predict the blackbody spectrum. Planck showed that the blackbody oscillators must be restricted to quantum transitions. In 1927, Dirac published his first work on quantum electrodynamics, for which he used quantum field theory. With this foundation, Heisenberg, Jordan, and Pauli incorporated relativistic invariance in quantized Maxwell's equations in 1928 and 1929.

However it took another 10 years before the theory could be applied to the problem of the Klein paradox. In 1941 Friedrich Hund showed that, under the conditions of the paradox, two currents of opposite charge are spontaneously generated at the step. In modern terminology, pairs of electrons and positrons are spontaneously created at the step potential. These results were confirmed in 1981 by Alex Hansen and Finn Ravndal using a more general treatment.

== Derivation ==
Consider a relativistic particle with mass $m$ and energy $E$ approaching a potential step of height $V_0 > E+mc^2$ located at $x=0$ at normal incidence.

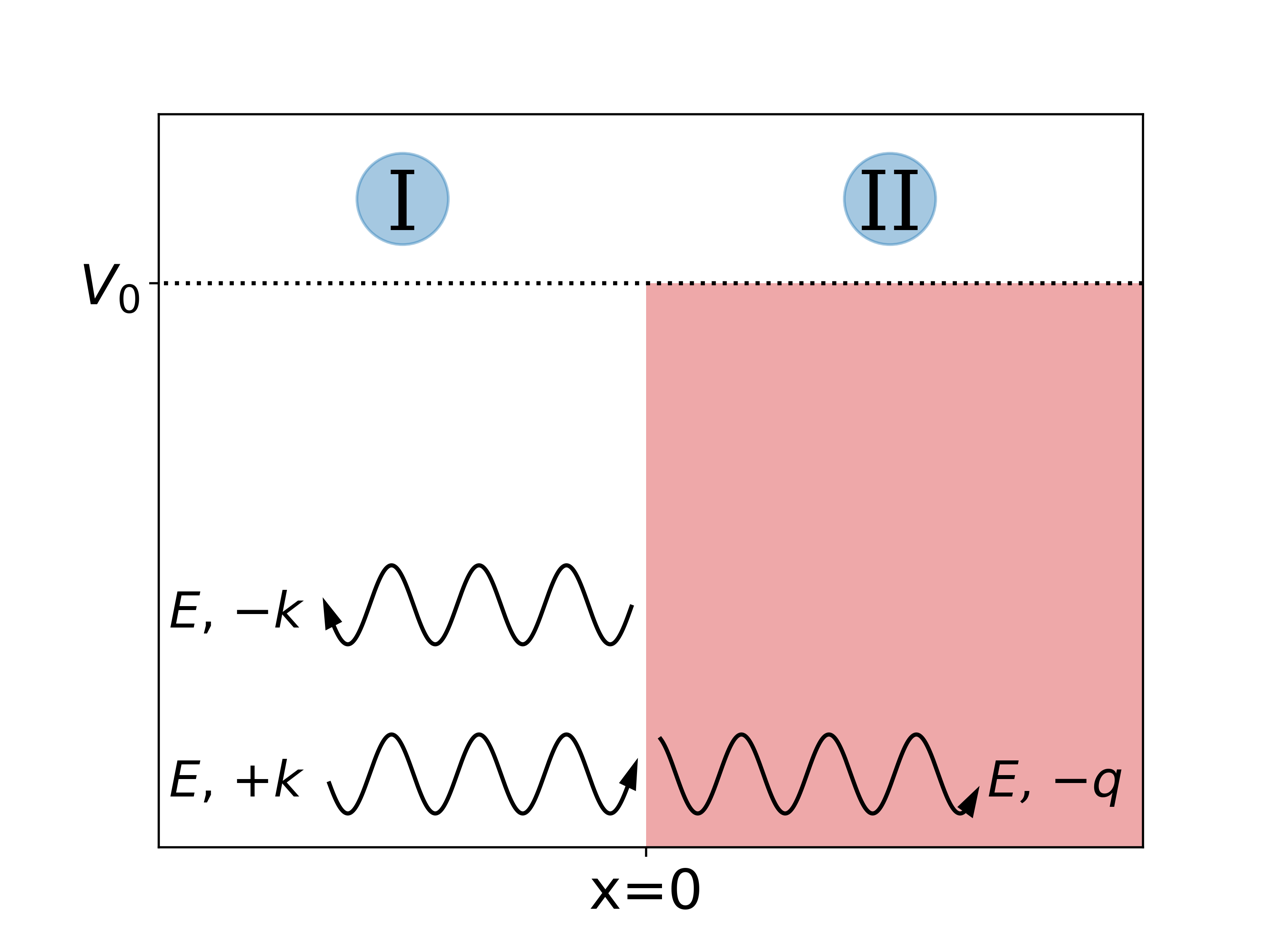
Sketch of the situation in the derivation. A particle propagates rightward to a potential step and is partially reflected and partially transmitted.

We can consider this problem using the time-independent Dirac equation. This derivation uses the two-dimensional version of the Dirac equation because it is simpler and still retains the paradox.

$$\hat H \Psi = E\Psi$$,

where the wave function is a two-component spinor

$$\Psi=\begin{pmatrix}\psi_1\\ \psi_2\end{pmatrix}$$,

and the Hamiltonian is

$$\hat H=-i \hbar \hat \vec \sigma \nabla + V(\vec{x}) \hat I_2 + mc^2 \hat \sigma_z$$,

where the $\hat \sigma$'s are the Pauli matrices, $\hat I_2$ is the identity matrix, and $c$ is the speed of light. Taking the particle to propagate in the x-direction, these equations reduce to

$$i\hbar c \frac{d\psi_2}{dx}=[E-mc^2-V(x)]\psi_1$$,
$$i\hbar c \frac{d\psi_1}{dx}=[E+mc^2-V(x)]\psi_2$$.

Assuming the particle is propagating from the left, we obtain two solutions — one before the step, in region (I) and one under the potential, in region (II):

$$\Psi_\text{I}=e^{ikx}\left( \begin{matrix} 1 \\ \alpha\end{matrix} \right)+re^{-ikx}\left( \begin{matrix} 1 \\ -\alpha\end{matrix} \right)$$,
$$\Psi_\text{II}=te^{iqx}\left( \begin{matrix} 1 \\ 1/\beta\end{matrix} \right)$$,

where the coefficients r and t are complex numbers representing the reflection and transmission respectively,

$$k=\frac{\sqrt{E^2-m^2c^4}}{\hbar c}$$

is the wave vector before the potential step,

$$q=-\frac{\sqrt{(V_0-E)^2-m^2c^4}}{\hbar c}$$

is the wave vector after the potential step (it is negative because the group velocity for a particle with $E+mc^2<V_0$ is opposite, requiring the minus-sign to ensure it is moving from left-to-right),

$$\alpha=\sqrt{\frac{E-mc^2}{E+mc^2}}$$,

and

$$\beta = \sqrt{\frac{V_0-E-mc^2}{V_0-E+mc^2}}$$.

From the continuity of the wave function, we can find that

$$1+r=t$$,
$$\alpha(1-r)=t/\beta$$.

Solving this system of equations gives

$$r=\frac{\alpha \beta-1}{\alpha \beta + 1}$$.

Then, the reflection coefficient (which can be interpreted as the probability that an incoming particle is reflected by the potential step) is given by

$$R=r^2=\left( \frac{\alpha \beta-1}{\alpha \beta + 1} \right)^2$$,

and the transmission coefficient can be calculated as

$$T=1-R=1-\left( \frac{\alpha \beta-1}{\alpha \beta + 1} \right)^2$$.

Animation of the transmission and reflection coefficients as a function of incoming electron energy and potential height $V_0$. The right panel shows the allowed energy states.

The transmission thus remains finite when $V_0 \rightarrow \infty$. This is a counterintuitive result compared to non-relativistic quantum mechanics (where one would expect the transmission to go to zero), which is why this phenomenon was named the Klein paradox.

One result from this equation is that, for massless particles, the transmission probability is always exactly one, regardless of the height of the potential barrier. This result is especially relevant given that electrons in graphene behave as massless particles that obey the Dirac equation.

A full resolution uses particle–anti-particle pair production in the context of quantum field theory.

=== Other cases ===
These results were expanded to higher dimensions, and to other types of potentials, such as a linear step, a square barrier, a smooth potential, etc. Many experiments in electron transport in graphene rely on the Klein paradox for massless particles.

== Graphene ==
Because electrons around the Fermi level in graphene obey a version of the Dirac equation, Klein tunneling is theoretically predicted to occur in it. In this system, the potential step can be a p–n junction. In the example of a p–n–p junction, an electron tunneling through the potential barrier can be interpreted as the electron briefly turning into a hole inside the barrier, and then turning back into an electron again on the other side. During this process, the electron never occupied a classically forbidden state.

Observing Klein tunneling in graphene experimentally is nontrivial because the resistance of a sample is not only determined by the tunneling, but also by other effects such as disorder. Taking these effects into account, direct resistance measurements give evidence for Klein tunneling occurring in p–n junctions in graphene samples.

Quantum interference experiments across a full p–n–p junction also show evidence of Klein tunneling.

== See also ==
- List of paradoxes
- Dirac equation
- Graphene
