= Helmuth Kulenkampff =

German physicist

- Born: 5 December 1895
- Died: 12 June 1971 (aged 75)
- Education: Ludwig-Maximilians-Universität München
- Known for: Studies of X-ray behaviour
- Scientific career
- Fields: Physicist
- Workplaces: University of Würzburg
- Doctoral advisor: Ernst Wagner
- Doctoral students: Elmar Zeitler

Helmuth Kulenkampff (5 December 1895 – 12 June 1971) was a physicist notable for his studies of X-rays. He obtained his PhD in 1922 under Ernst Wagner at the Ludwig-Maximilians-Universität München with a thesis entitled: Über das Kontinuierliche Röntgenspektrum (On the continuous X-ray spectrum).

In 1937, Alfred Ehmert made the surprising observation that cosmic ray absorption in water is less than in air for same effective thickness. In 1938, Kulenkampff was the first to correctly explain this effect in terms of meson decay, and this enabled Hans Heinrich Euler and Werner Heisenberg to calculate an improved value for meson decay time.
