= Rudolf Mentzel =

German chemist, professor, SS officer and member of Reich Research Council (1900–1987)

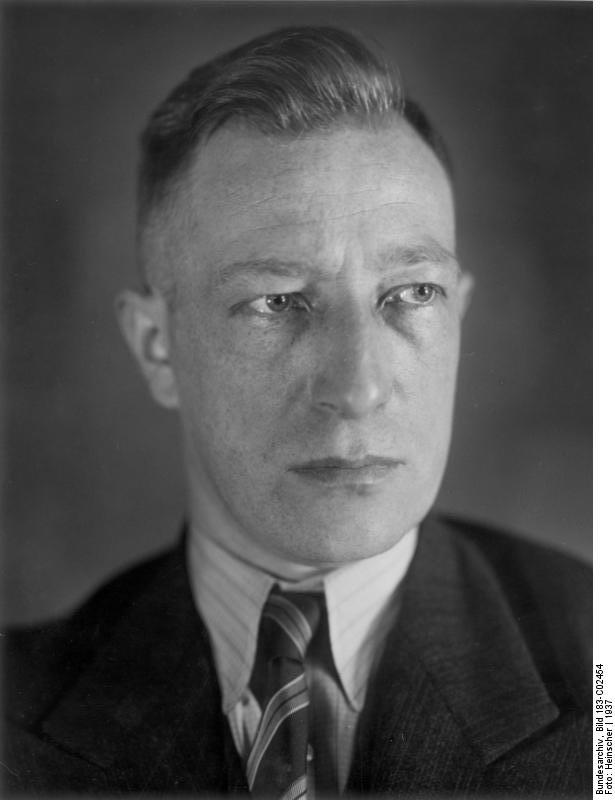
- Rudolf Mentzel, c. 1937
- Born: April 28, 1900; Bremen, German Empire
- Died: December 5, 1987 (aged 87); Berlin, West-Germany
- Citizenship: Germany
- Education: University of Göttingen
- Known for: German nuclear program
- Scientific career
- Fields: Nuclear Chemistry
- Workplaces: Reichserziehungsministerium; Technische Universität Berlin; German Research Foundation; Schutzstaffel (SS)

Notes
- Note: Mentzel was Colonel in Schutzstaffel.

Rudolf Mentzel PhD (28 April 1900 – 5 December 1987) was a German chemist and a Nazi policy-maker. An influential figure and one of the leading science administrators in Germany's nuclear energy project, Mentzel served as the scientific and technical adviser on the development of atomic bombs to the German government, and on some part, as the director of this program. Originally a Nazi by political orientation, Mentzel served as one of the top leading science policy-makers to Adolf Hitler and his cabinet in his role as an undersecretary of the Reich Ministry of Education (REM) in the Office for Science. In the Kaiser Wilhelm Society, he was on the advisory board and, during World War II, Second Vice President of the Kaiser Wilhelm, supervising the clandestine research critical to develop the atomic bombs. During this period, his sphere of responsibility also momentarily grew and he soon was appointed as the president of the German Association for the Support and Advancement of Scientific Research, acting as the director of the nuclear program.

After World War II, he was interned for three years by the American military government in post-1945 Germany, but was soon released after evidence proved no affiliation with the Nazi Party.

== Education ==
Mentzel studied and gained B.Sc. in Mathematics and B.S. in Chemistry at the University of Göttingen, and he received his doctorate in 1925 with a thesis on Stereoisomerism and transformation of b-substituted decahydro-naphthalenes. At Göttingen, he was a Kreisleiter (circuit leader) of the Nationalsozialistische Deutsche Arbeiterpartei (NSDAP, National Socialist Workers Party), of which he had been a member since 1922. Due to his participation in the Kapp putsch in 1920, he held a golden party badge. Mentzel completed his Habilitation in 1933 at the Justus Liebig-Universität Gießen with a top-secret Habilitationsschrift (thesis) on Wehrchemie (military chemistry - the military use of poison gases).

== Career ==
From 1934, Mentzel was an adviser on science to the Reichserziehungsministerium (REM, Reich Ministry of Education). From 1939, he stepped up to the position of Ministerialdirektor (Undersecretary) of the Amt für Wissenschaft (Office for Science) of the REM; as such he headed W-II, the Science Office for military research.

=== Ministry of Education ===
Also in 1934, Mentzel began a role in academia, parallel to his role in the REM, when he was appointed nichtplanmäßiger Professor (supernumerary professor) at the Technische Hochschule Berlin (today, Technische Universität Berlin). In 1935, on the instigation of the Reich Minister of the REM Bernhard Rust, Mentzel became an ordentlicher Professor (ordinarius professor) of chemistry in the defense technology department of the Technische Hochschule Berlin.

=== Atomic bomb program ===
In 1935, Peter Adolf Thiessen became director of the Kaiser-Wilhelm Institut für physikalische Chemie und Elektrochemie (KWIPC, Kaiser Wilhelm Institute for Physical Chemistry and Electrochemistry; today, the Fritz-Haber-Institut der Max-Planck-Gesellschaft), in Berlin-Dahlem; the KWIPC was in institute under the umbrella organization the Kaiser-Wilhelm Gesellschaft (KWG, Kaiser Wilhelm Society, today the Max-Planck Gesellschaft, which was under the Amt für Wissenschaft of the REM. That same year, Rust, with the support of Thiessen, had Mentzel appointed commissioner in the managing committee of the KWG. Thiessen, as director of the KWIPC, had a flat on Faradayweg in Berlin-Dahlem that the former director Fritz Haber used for business purposes; Mentzel shared this flat with Thiessen.

Mentzel was a rival to Johannes Stark, and in 1936, Mentzel succeeded Stark as president of the Notgemeinschaft der Deutschen Wissenschaft (NG, Emergency Association of German Science). In 1937, the NG was renamed the Deutsche Gemeinschaft zur Erhaltung und Förderrung der Forschung (German Association for the Support and Advancement of Scientific Research); in short, known as the Deutsche Forschungs-Gemeinschaft (DFG, German Research Foundation). As president of the DFG, Mentzel outlined his science policy in the article Zwanzig Jahre deutsche Forschung. Mentzel was succeeded in 1939 by Abraham Esau.

From 1937, Mentzel was on the Senat (Senate) of the KWG, and from 1940 to 1944, he was Second Vice President of the KWG.

=== Military service ===
In 1937, the Reichsforschungsrat (RFR, Reich Research Council) was inaugurated under Bernhard Rust on the initiative of Erich Schumann. It was a coordinating agency of the REM for the purpose of centralizing the planning of basic and applied research, and expanding the influence of the military, with the exception of aeronautical research, which was kept under the purview of Hermann Göring. Early in 1939, the RFR started the German nuclear energy project, also known as the Uranverein. In September 1939, the Heereswaffenamt (HWA, Army Ordnance Office) squeezed out the RFR and took control of the project. When it was apparent that the nuclear energy project would not make a decisive contribution to ending the war effort in the near term, control of the project was turned over to the RFR in 1942. However, on 9 June 1942, Adolf Hitler issued a decree for the reorganization of the RFR as a separate legal entity under the Reichsministerium für Bewaffnung und Munition (RMBM, Reich Ministry for Armament and Ammunition, after autumn 1943 the Reich Ministry for Armament and War Production); the decree appointed Reich Marshall Hermann Göring as the president. Over the life of the Uranverein, even with the transfer of the RFR to Göring's purview, Mentzel, as Ministerialdirektor of the REM, was able to make inputs to and exert some influence on the project.

In the Schutzstaffel (SS), Mentzel attained the rank of Oberführer (Senior Colonel).

=== After war ===
After World War II, Mentzel was interned by the American occupation forces for three years. His release was, in part, brought about by the affidavit provided by Walther Gerlach, at Mentzel's request in a letter dated December 6, 1948. These exoneration attestations were accepted only from those who had been through the denazification process in Germany and had had no affiliation with the NSDAP. Mentzel, as a science policy maker, had sided with the pragmatists in promoting scientific efficiency, rather than with the politically motivate party ideologues.

== Legacy ==
Mount Mentzel in Antarctica was named after him in 1939.

== Selected literature of Mentzel ==
- Rudolf Mentzel Zwanzig Jahre deutsche Forschung, in: Aus der Arbeit des Stifterverbandes der Deutschen Forschungsgemeinschaft. Zur 20. Wiederkehr des Geburtstages des Stiftverbandes 14 December 1940, pp. 1-15.

== See also ==
- Paul Harteck
