= Karl Heinrich Emil Becker =

German general (1879–1940)

Karl Becker
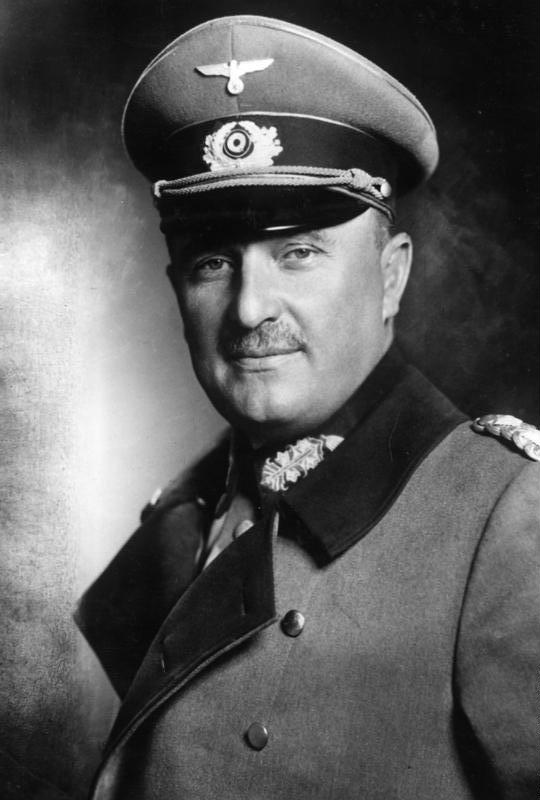

Chief of the Heereswaffenamt
- In office 1 March 1938 – 8 April 1940
- Preceded by: Kurt Liese
- Succeeded by: Emil Leeb

President of the Reichsforschungsrat
- In office 1937 – 8 April 1940
- Appointed by: Bernhard Rust
- Preceded by: Office established
- Succeeded by: Bernhard Rust

Personal details
- Born: Karl Heinrich Emil Becker; 14 September 1879 Speyer
- Died: 8 April 1940 (aged 60) Berlin
- Cause of death: Suicide

Military service
- Allegiance: German Empire; Weimar Republic; Nazi Germany
- Years of service: 1898–1940
- Rank: General der Artillerie
- Unit: Royal Bavarian 2nd Foot Artillery Regiment
- Battles/wars: World War I; Siege of Antwerp; World War II

Karl Heinrich Emil Becker (14 September 1879 – 8 April 1940) was a German weapons engineer and artillery general. He advocated and implemented close ties of the military to science for purposes of advanced weapons development. He was the head of the Army Ordnance Office, Senator of the Kaiser Wilhelm Society, first president of the Reich Research Council, the first general officer to be a member of the Prussian Academy of Sciences, as well as being a professor at both the University of Berlin and Technische Universität Berlin.

In the late 1920s, he realised that a loophole in the Treaty of Versailles allowed Germany to develop rocket weapons. The military-scientific infrastructure he helped implement supported the German nuclear energy program, known as the Uranium Club. Being depressed over heavy criticism from Hitler for shortfalls in munitions production, he committed suicide in 1940. He was given a State funeral.

== Career ==
From 1898, Becker was a military engineer.

From 1901 to 1903, Becker studied at the Munich Artillery and Engineering School. From 1906 to 1911, he studied at the Berlin Military Engineering Academy, specializing in ballistics under Carl Julius Cranz; from 1908 to 1911, he was a teaching assistant at the Ballistics Laboratory there. From 1911 to 1914, he was a member of the Artillery Examining Board. In 1913, Becker co-authored a revision of Cranz' classic text, Lehrbuch der Ballistik.

During World War I, Becker held two positions. From 1914 to 1916, he commanded a 42cm mortar battery. From 1917 to 1919, he was an advisor on artillery ballistics at the Weapons and Equipment Inspection (Inspektion für Waffen und Gerät), which later became the Heereswaffenamt (HWA, Army Ordnance Office).

From 1919 to 1923, Becker studied chemistry and metallurgy. He was awarded a doctorate of engineering in 1922, with a thesis on cathodic change of phenol.

From 1922, Becker was an advisor to the HWA inspections office.

Becker was aware of the advantages of a close relationship between the military and science in the development of future weapons technology. As early as 1924, he recommended the establishment of a central laboratory of chemistry and physics. But only when he was director of the Ballistics and Ammunition Department of the Weapons and Equipment Inspection (Inspektion für Waffen und Gerät) was he able to implement his recommendation. The Central Office of Army Physics and Army Chemistry (Zentralstelle für Heeresphysik und Heereschemie) was formed in 1926 and recognized as an Armed Forces department in 1929. When Adolf Hitler came to power in 1933, this department took on greater importance and received generous funding from the Reich. Its Research Department established top-quality facilities, one of them was the Heeresversuchsanstalt (Armed Forces testing station) in Gottow; it was under the direction Kurt Diebner and played a central role in the German nuclear energy project, also known as the Uranverein (Uranium Club).

Becker, head of the ballistics and munitions section of the HWA Weapons Testing Division, was a key early supporter of Germany's development of the rocket as a weapon. In 1929, Becker got permission of the Reichswehrministerium (RWM, Reich Ministry of Defense) to do so. He was interested in the development of both solid-fuel and liquid-fuel rockets. Later, one of his subordinates, Colonel Dr Walter Dornberger became important as leader of the V2 rocket program. Wernher von Braun was hired in 1932.

From 1932, Becker was an Honorary Professor of military sciences at the Friedrich-Wilhelms-Universität (later, the Humboldt-Universität zu Berlin, i.e. University of Berlin). From autumn 1933, he was an ordentlicher Professor (ordinarius professor) of technical physics at the Technische Hochschule Berlin in Berlin Charlottenburg (later, Technische Universität Berlin). From 1935, he was ordentlicher Professor of defense technology, physics, and ballistics, as well as dean of the military engineering department (Wehrtechnische Fakultät), which had been newly created in 1933, at the Technische Hochschule Berlin. He was on the supervisory board of the Kaiser-Wilhelm Gesellschaft, the umbrella organization for numerous technical institutes. From 1935, he was the first general officer to be a member of the Preußische Akademie der Wissenschaften (PAW, Prussian Academy of Sciences). In 1937, Becker significantly expanded the Wehrtechnische Fakultät.

From November 1933, Becker was head of the research department and the Weapons Testing Office, and from 4 February 1938, head of the HWA, in addition to his positions at the Technische Hochschule Berlin and the University of Berlin. From 1937, he was also first president of the Reichsforschungsrat (RFR, Reich Research Council), appointed by Bernhard Rust, Minister of the Reichserziehungsministerium (REM, Reich Ministry of Education).

On 8 April 1940, just one day before the invasion of Denmark and Norway (Operation Weserübung), Becker committed suicide. Becker had been depressed for months, as he had been heavily criticized by Hitler and others for shortfalls in munitions production. Becker's suicide was covered up by a State funeral on 12 April 1940, personally attended by Hitler, followed by interment in the Berlin Invalidenfriedhof cemetery.

== Bibliography ==
- Barber, Murray R. (2017), V2 The A4 Rocket From Peenemünde To Redstone, Crecy Publications, ISBN 978-1-906537-53-1
- Ciesla, Burghard (2000), "Abschied von der „reinen" Wissenschaft: „Wehrtechnik" und Anwendungsforschung in der Preufiischen Akademie nach 1933" [Farewell to "pure" science: "Defense" and applied research in the Prussian Academy in 1933], Die Preußische Akademie der Wissenschaften zu Berlin 1914–1945 [The Prussian Academy of Sciences in Berlin from 1914 to 1945], Akademie Verlag, pp. 483–513
- Hentschel, Klaus; Hentschel, Ann M., eds. (1996), Physics and National Socialism: An Anthology of Primary Sources, Birkhäuser, ISBN 0-8176-5312-0. This book is a collection of 121 primary German documents relating to physics under National Socialism. The documents have been translated and annotated, and there is a lengthy introduction to put them into perspective.
- Neufeld, Michael J. (2007), Von Braun: Dreamer of Space, Engineer of War, Knopf, ISBN 978-0-307-26292-9
- Renneberg, Monika; Walker, Mark, eds. (2002), Science, Technology and National Socialism, Cambridge
