= German nuclear program during World War II =

Research project in Nazi Germany

German nuclear program
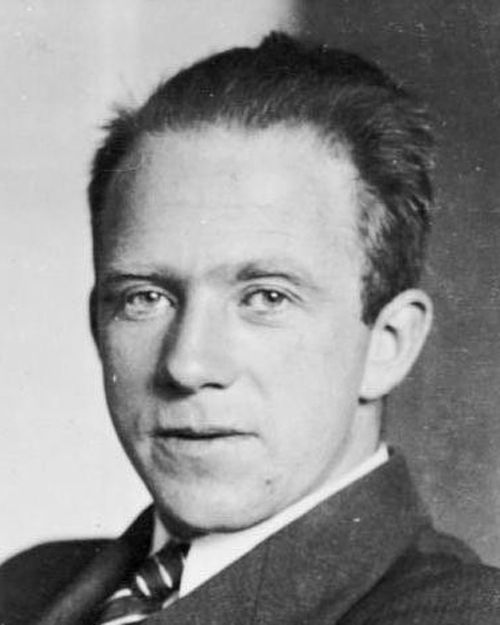
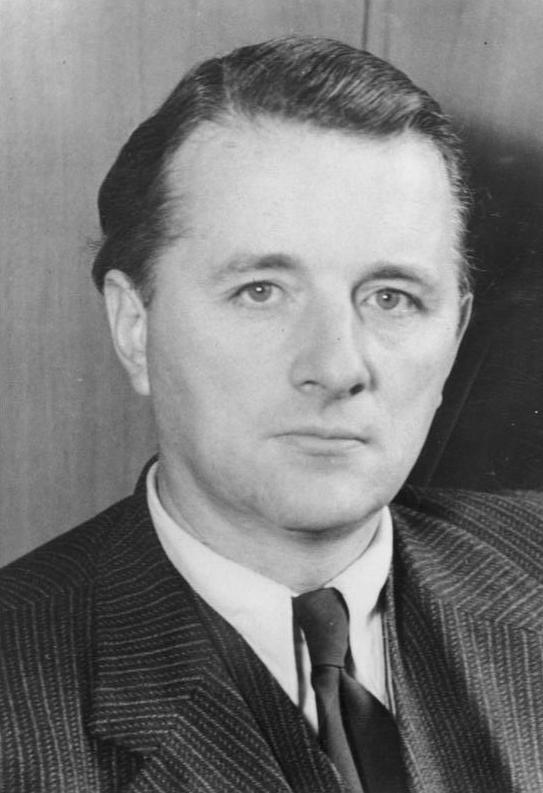
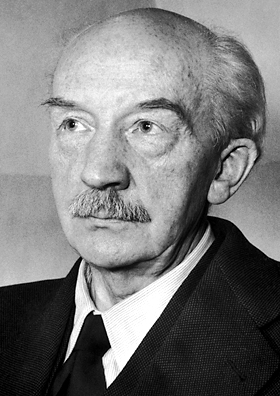
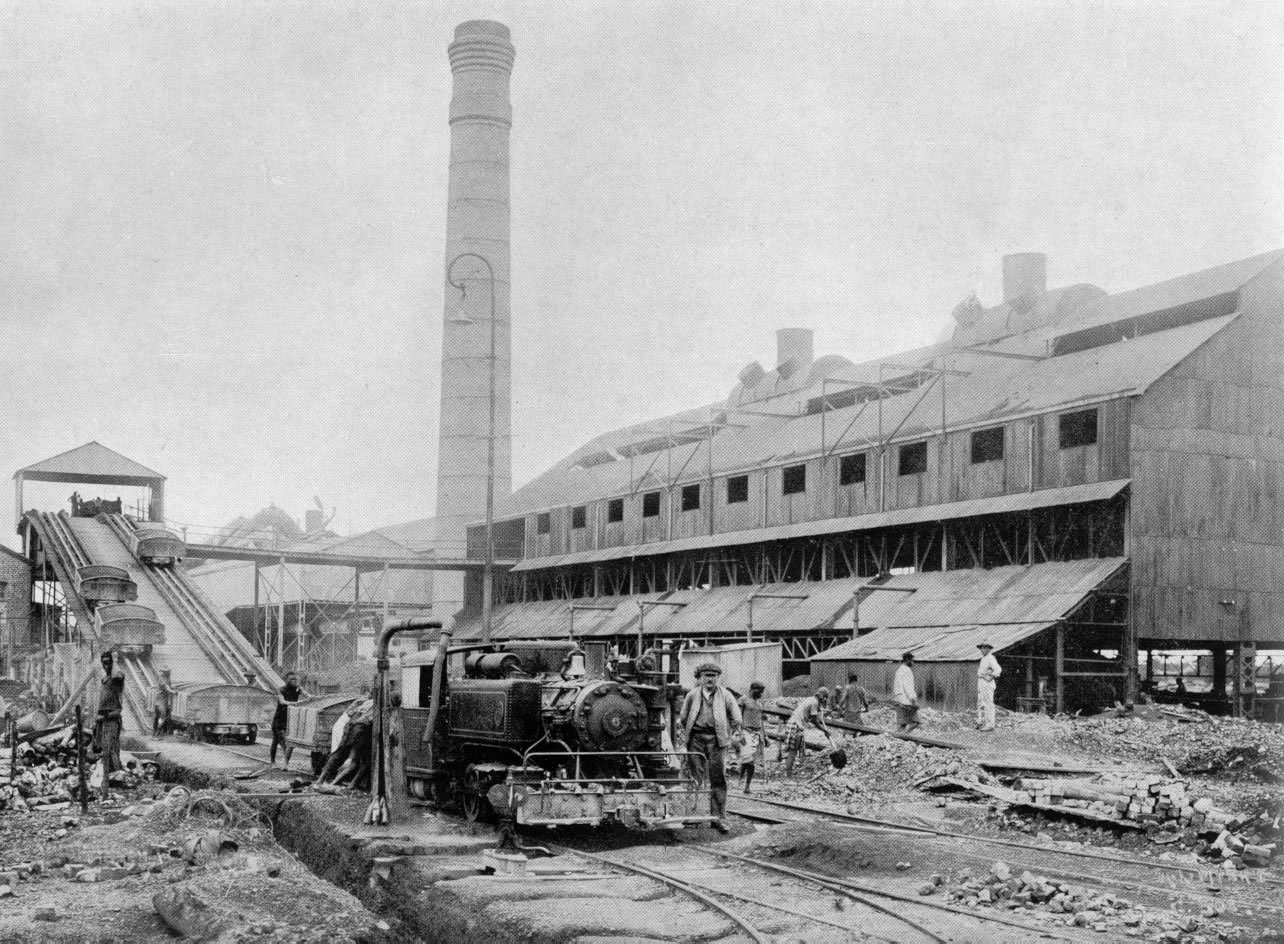
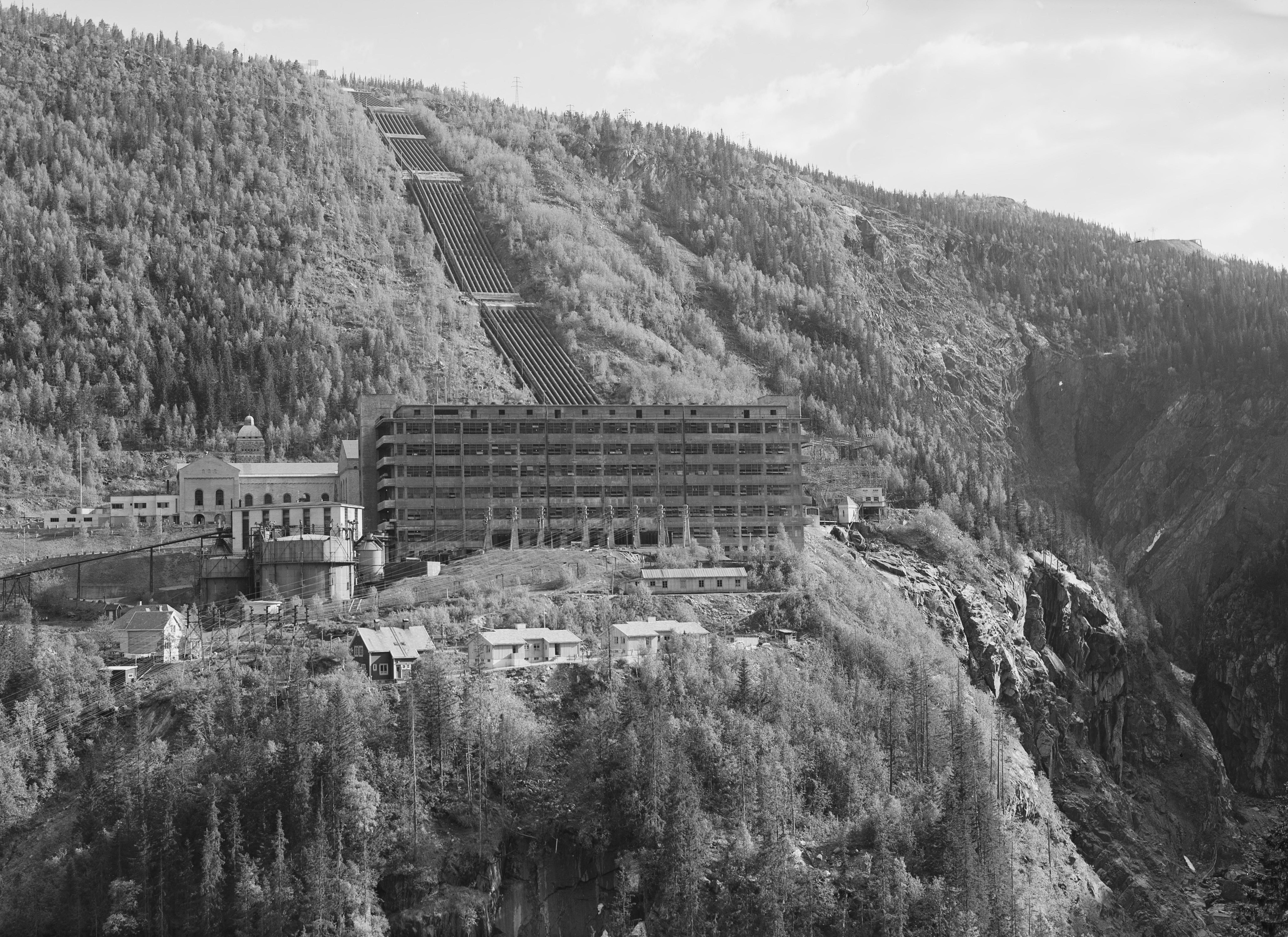
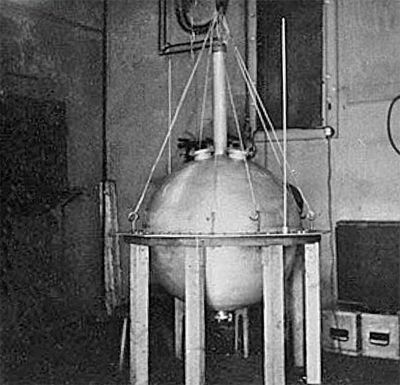
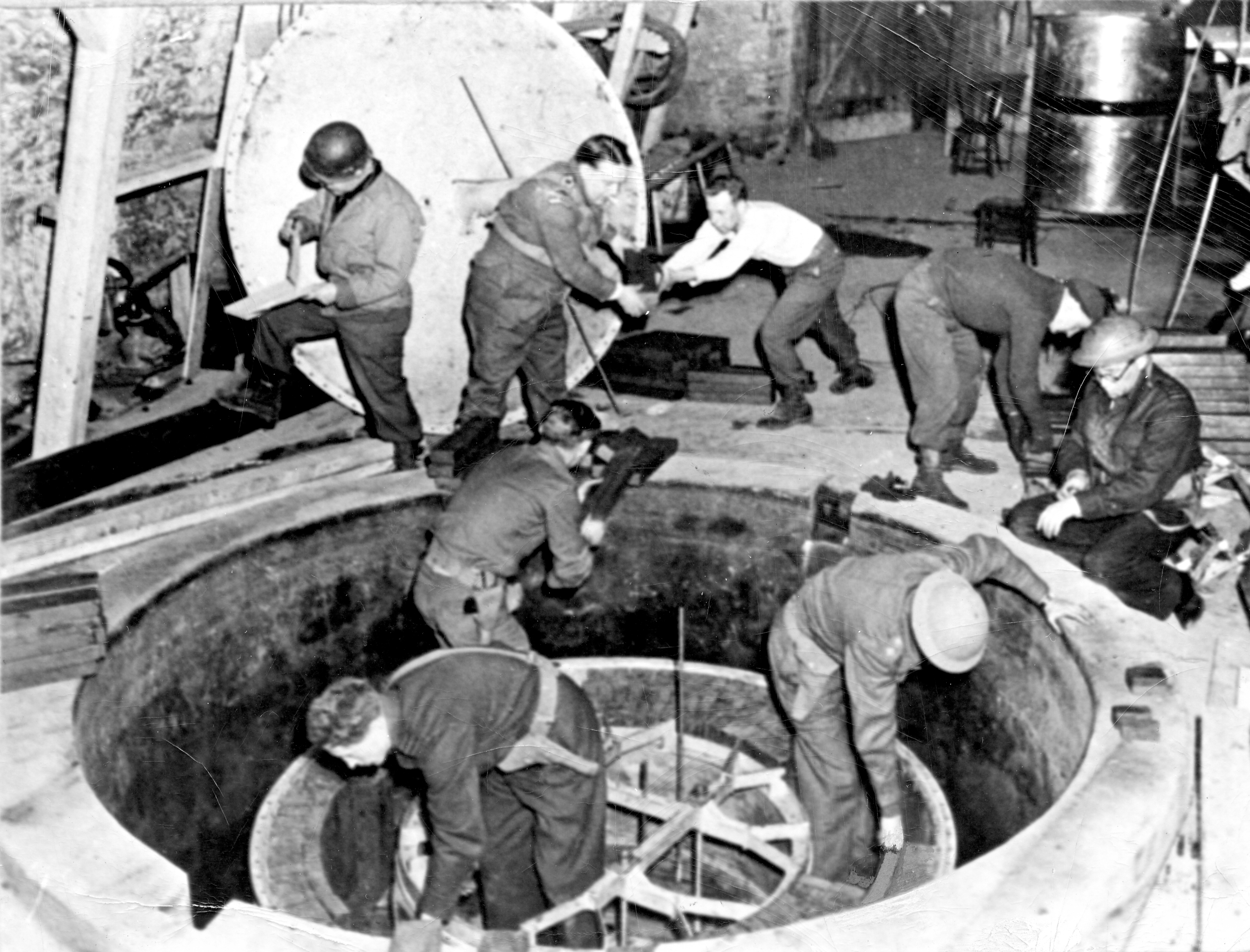
- Werner Heisenberg, a theoretical physics leader of the project; Paul Harteck, an experimental leader; Walter Bothe, a leader on the project's cyclotrons; Uranium processing in Katanga, Belgian Congo; Vemork, the project's source of heavy water; Leipzig L-IV, an early nuclear experiment; Alsos Mission soldiers dismantle the Haigerloch atomic pile
- Founded: April 1939
- Disbanded: 1945 (Note: Due to the surrender of Germany. The program effort ceased due to the Fall of Berlin.)
- Country: Germany
- Nicknames: Uranverein; Uranprojekt
- Patron: Army Ordnance Office; Reich Research Council

Nazi Germany undertook several research programs relating to nuclear technology, including nuclear weapons and nuclear reactors, before and during World War II. These were variously called Uranverein (Uranium Society) or Uranprojekt (Uranium Project). The first effort started in April 1939, just months after the discovery of nuclear fission in Berlin in December 1938, but ended shortly ahead of the September 1939 German invasion of Poland, for which many German physicists were drafted into the Wehrmacht. A second effort under the administrative purview of the Wehrmacht's Heereswaffenamt began on September 1, 1939, the day of the invasion of Poland. The program eventually expanded into three main efforts: Uranmaschine (nuclear reactor) development, uranium and heavy water production, and uranium isotope separation. Eventually, the German military determined that nuclear fission would not contribute significantly to the war, and in January 1942 the Heereswaffenamt turned the program over to the Reich Research Council (Reichsforschungsrat) while continuing to fund the activity.

The program was split up among nine major institutes where the directors dominated research and set their own objectives. Subsequently, the number of scientists working on applied nuclear fission began to diminish as many researchers applied their talents to more pressing wartime demands. The most influential people in the Uranverein included Kurt Diebner, Abraham Esau, Walther Gerlach, and Erich Schumann. Schumann was one of the most powerful and influential physicists in Germany. Diebner, throughout the life of the nuclear weapon project, had more control over nuclear fission research than did Walther Bothe, Klaus Clusius, Otto Hahn, Paul Harteck, or Werner Heisenberg. Esau was appointed as Reichsmarschall Hermann Göring's plenipotentiary for nuclear physics research in December 1942, and was succeeded by Walther Gerlach after he resigned in December 1943.

Politicization of German academia under the Nazi regime of 1933–1945 had driven many physicists, engineers, and mathematicians out of Germany as early as 1933. Those of Jewish heritage who did not leave were quickly purged, further thinning the ranks of researchers. The politicization of the universities, along with Wehrmacht demands for more manpower (many scientists and technical personnel were conscripted, despite possessing technical and engineering skills), substantially reduced the number of able German physicists.

Developments took place in several phases, but in the words of historian Mark Walker, it ultimately became "frozen at the laboratory level" with the "modest goal" to "build a nuclear reactor which could sustain a nuclear fission chain reaction for a significant amount of time and to achieve the complete separation of at least tiny amounts of the uranium isotopes". The scholarly consensus is that it failed to achieve these goals, and that despite fears at the time, the Germans had never been close to producing nuclear weapons. The final attempt at constructing a reactor, the 1945 Haigerloch research reactor, did not achieve criticality. With the war in Europe ending in early 1945, various Allied powers competed with each other to obtain surviving components of the German nuclear industry (personnel, facilities, and materiel), as they did with the pioneering V-2 short-range ballistic missile program. The Western Allied effort was the Alsos Mission and the Soviet effort was Russian Alsos. Due to the success of the Manhattan Project, the Western Allies prioritized denying German nuclear scientists and resources to the nascent Soviet atomic bomb project.

== Discovery of nuclear fission ==
In December 1938, German chemist Otto Hahn and his assistant Fritz Strassmann sent a manuscript to the German science journal Naturwissenschaften ("Natural Sciences") reporting that they had detected and identified the element barium after bombarding uranium with neutrons. Their article was published on 6 January 1939. On 19 December 1938, eighteen days before the publication, Otto Hahn communicated these results and his conclusion of a bursting of the uranium nucleus in a letter to his colleague and friend Lise Meitner, who had fled Germany in July to the Netherlands and then to Sweden. Meitner and her nephew Otto Robert Frisch confirmed Hahn's conclusion of a bursting and correctly interpreted the results as "nuclear fission" – a term coined by Frisch. Frisch confirmed this experimentally on 13 January 1939.

== First Uranverein and other early 1939 efforts ==
On 22 April 1939, after hearing a colloquium paper by his colleague Wilhelm Hanle at the University of Göttingen proposing the use of uranium fission in an Uranmaschine (uranium machine, i.e., nuclear reactor), Georg Joos, along with Hanle, notified Wilhelm Dames, at the Reichserziehungsministerium (REM, Reich Ministry of Education), of potential military and economic applications of nuclear energy. Abraham Esau, a physicist at the Reich Research Council of the REM, organized a meeting for what become informally known as a Uranverein (Uranium Club). The group included the physicists Walther Bothe, Robert Döpel, Hans Geiger, Wolfgang Gentner (probably sent by Walther Bothe), Wilhelm Hanle, Gerhard Hoffmann, and Georg Joos; Peter Debye was invited, but he did not attend. After this, informal work began at the Georg-August University of Göttingen by Joos, Hanle, and their colleague Reinhold Mannkopff. Formally the group of physicists was known as the Arbeitsgemeinschaft für Kernphysik (Nuclear Physics Association). This initial work at Göttingen lasted until the fall of 1939, when Joos and Hanle were drafted into other military research.

Independently of this effort, Paul Harteck, director of the physical chemistry department at the University of Hamburg and an advisor to the Heereswaffenamt (HWA, Army Ordnance Office), and his teaching assistant Wilhelm Groth wrote a letter on 24 April 1939 to Army Ordnance which also mentioned the military application of nuclear chain reactions. Harteck would not receive a reply until August 1939, however, as part of the second Uranverein.

Also independently of the first Uranverein, Nikolaus Riehl, the head of the scientific headquarters at Auergesellschaft (usually known as just "Auer"), a German industrial firm, read a June 1939 paper by Siegfried Flügge, on the technical use of nuclear energy from uranium. As Auer had a substantial amount of uranium on hand as a waste product from the process of extracting radium, Riehl recognized the possibility of uranium production as a business opportunity for the company, and July 1939 contacted the Army Ordnance Office on the matter. Army Ordnance eventually provided an order for the production of uranium oxide, which took place in the Auer plant in Oranienburg, north of Berlin.

These three efforts, as noted, were independent and lasted until the fall of 1939, when the outbreak of World War II disrupted the work at Göttingen, and also prompted the HWA (Army Ordnance) to take over the work from the Reich Research Council. After the fact, this early work was designated as the first Uranverein, with the HWA's reorganized project being designated the second Uranverein.

== Second Uranverein ==
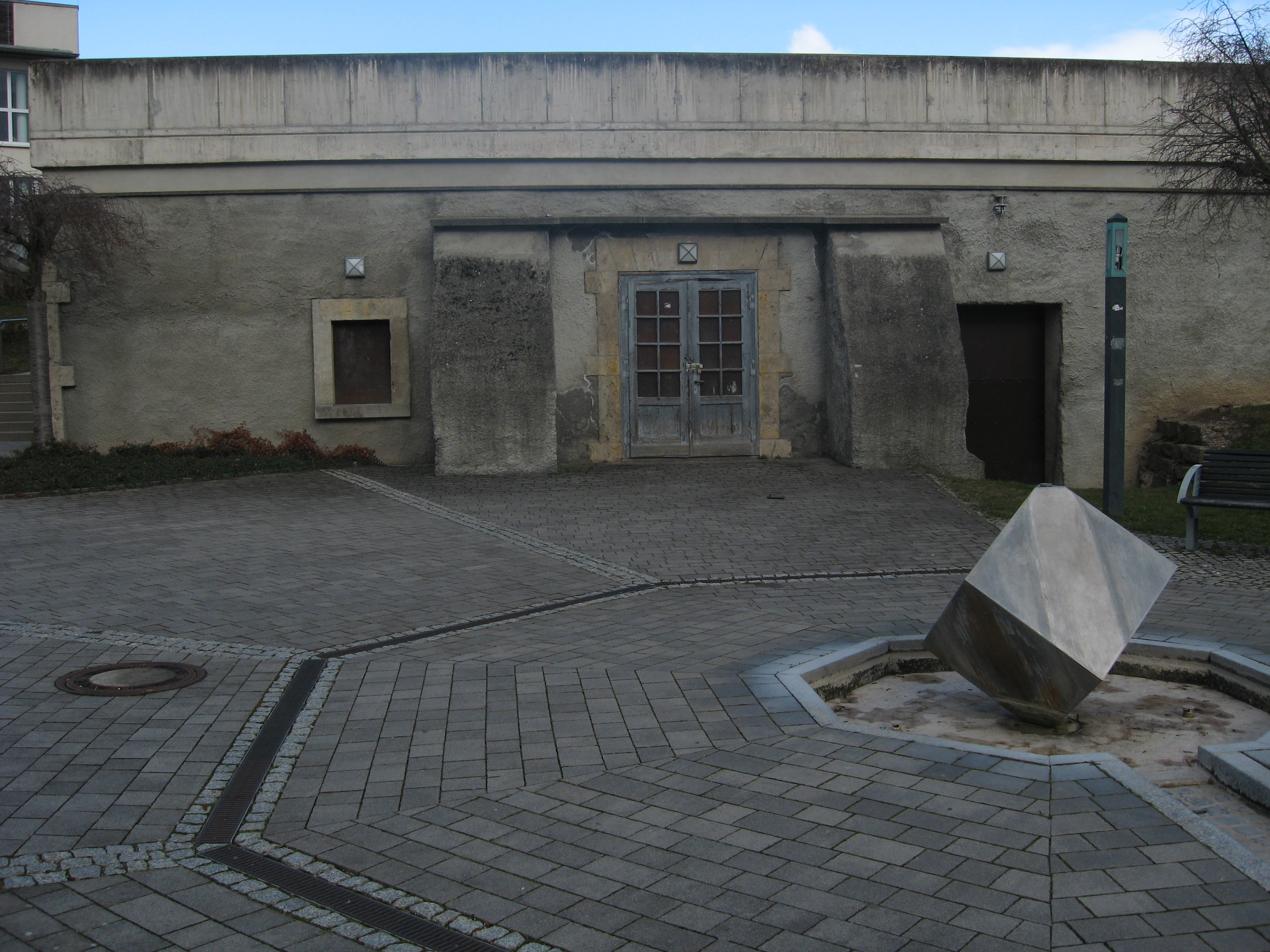
Atomkeller in Stadtilm

In August 1939, just before the German invasion of Poland precipitated the formal start of World War II, the Army Ordnance Office (HWA) moved to take over the work of the Reichsforschungsrat (RFR, Reich Research Council) of the Reich Education Ministry (REM), and ordered the RFR to halt all experiments and work on nuclear energy. Esau protested that the discovery of nuclear fission was too recent to warrant such an action, but was ignored. These actions were initiated by the physicist Kurt Diebner, an advisor to the HWA, in association with Erich Bagge. In September 1939, Diebner organized a meeting in Berlin on 16 September.

The invitees to this meeting included Walther Bothe, Siegfried Flügge, Hans Geiger, Otto Hahn, Paul Harteck, Gerhard Hoffmann, Josef Mattauch, and Georg Stetter. Its purpose, as Bagge later recalled, was

to make all preparations to be able to answer beyond doubt the question of whether generating nuclear energy was feasible. It would certainly be very nice if it were possible to acquire a new source of energy, it would also very probably have military importance; a negative answer would be just as important, since we could be sure that the enemy would also not be able to make use of it.

This group, like the one before it, referred to itself informally as a Uranverein. A second meeting was held soon thereafter, and included Klaus Clusius, Robert Döpel, Werner Heisenberg, and Carl Friedrich von Weizsäcker. Also at this time, the Kaiser-Wilhelm Institut für Physik (KWIP, Kaiser Wilhelm Institute for Physics, after World War II the Max Planck Institute for Physics), in Berlin-Dahlem, was placed under HWA authority, with Diebner as the administrative director, and the military control of the nuclear research commenced. Although the official slogan of the government was "We must make use of physics for warfare", Heisenberg and his colleagues decided that they should instead "make use of warfare for physics".

Heisenberg said that in 1939, the physicists at this second meeting concluded that "in principle atomic bombs could be made, but they also emphasized that it would take a number of years", certainly not less than five. He also said that he "didn't report it to the Führer until two weeks later and very casually because I did not want the Führer to get so interested that he would order great efforts immediately to make the atomic bomb. Speer felt it was better that the whole thing should be dropped and the Führer also reacted that way." He said they presented the matter in this way for their own personal safety, as the probability of success was nearly zero, and that if many thousands of people working on an expensive and time-consuming project ended up developing nothing, there could be "extremely disagreeable consequences" for them. Luftwaffe Generalfeldmarschall Erhard Milch asked how long America might take to develop a nuclear weapon, and was given an estimate of 1944, though the group, among themselves, "believed that they would not be able to make atomic bombs before three or four years."

When it was apparent that the nuclear weapon project would not make a decisive contribution to ending the war in the near term, control of the KWIP was returned in January 1942 to its umbrella organization, the Kaiser-Wilhelm Gesellschaft (the Kaiser Wilhelm Society, after World War II the Max-Planck-Gesellschaft). HWA control of the project was subsequently passed to the RFR in July 1942. The nuclear weapon project thereafter maintained its kriegswichtig (war importance) designation, and funding continued from the military, but it was then split into the areas of uranium and heavy water production, uranium isotope separation, and the Uranmaschine (uranium machine, i.e., nuclear reactor). It was in effect broken up between institutes where the different directors dominated the research and set their own research agendas. The dominant personnel, facilities, and areas of research were:

- Walther Bothe – Director of the Institut für Physik (Institute for Physics) at the Kaiser-Wilhelm Institut für medizinische Forschung (KWImF, Kaiser Wilhelm Institute for Medical Research, after 1948 the Max-Planck-Institut für medizinische Forschung), in Heidelberg.
  - Measurement of nuclear constants. 6 physicists
- Klaus Clusius – Director of the Institute for Physical Chemistry at LMU Munich
  - Isotope separation and heavy water production. ca. 4 physical chemists and physicists
- Kurt Diebner – Director of the HWA Versuchsstelle (testing station) in Gottow and of the RFR experimental station in Stadtilm, Thuringia; he was also an advisor to the HWA on nuclear physics.
  - Measurement of nuclear constants. ca. 6 physicists
- Otto Hahn – Director of the Kaiser-Wilhelm-Institut für Chemie (KWIC, Kaiser Wilhelm Institute for Chemistry, after World War II the Max Planck Institut für Chemie – Otto Hahn Institut), in Berlin-Dahlem.
  - Transuranic elements, fission products, isotope separation, and measurement of nuclear constants. ca. 6 chemists and physicists
- Paul Harteck – Director of the Physical Chemistry Department of the University of Hamburg.
  - Heavy water production and isotope production. 5 physical chemists and physicists
- Werner Heisenberg – Director of the Department of Theoretical Physics at the University of Leipzig until summer 1942; thereafter acting director of the Kaiser-Wilhelm-Institut für Physik (Kaiser Wilhelm Institute for Physics), in Berlin-Dahlem.
  - Uranmaschine, isotope separation, and measurement of nuclear constants. ca. 7 physicists and physical chemists
- Hans Kopfermann – Director of the Second Experimental Physics Institute at the Georg-August University of Göttingen.
  - Isotope separation. 2 physicists
- Nikolaus Riehl – Scientific Director of the Auergesellschaft.
  - Uranium production. ca. 3 physicists and physical chemists
- Georg Stetter – Director of the II. Physikalisches Institut (Second Physics Institute) at the University of Vienna.
  - Transuranic elements and measurement of nuclear constants. ca. 6 physicists and physical chemists

The point in 1942 when the army relinquished control of the project was its zenith in terms of the number of personnel devoted to the effort, and this was no more than about seventy scientists, with about forty devoting more than half their time to nuclear fission research. After this the number diminished dramatically, and many of those not working with the main institutes stopped working on nuclear fission and devoted their efforts to more pressing war related work.

On 4 June 1942, a conference regarding the project, initiated by Albert Speer as head of the "Reich Ministry for Armament and Ammunition" (RMBM: Reichsministerium für Bewaffnung und Munition; after late 1943 the Reich Ministry for Armament and War Production), decided on its continuation merely for the aim of energy production. On 9 June 1942, Adolf Hitler issued a decree for the reorganization of the RFR as a separate legal entity under the RMBM; the decree appointed Reich Marshal Hermann Göring as its president. The reorganization was done under the initiative of Minister Albert Speer of the RMBM; it was necessary as the RFR under Bernhard Rust the Minister of Science, Education and National Culture was ineffective and was not achieving its purpose. The hope was that Göring would manage the RFR with the same discipline and efficiency as he had the aviation sector. A meeting was held on 6 July 1942 to discuss the function of the RFR and set its agenda. The meeting was a turning point in Nazi attitudes towards science, as well as recognition that the policies which drove Jewish scientists out of Germany were a mistake, as the Reich needed their expertise. Abraham Esau was appointed on 8 December 1942 as Hermann Göring's Bevollmächtigter (plenipotentiary) for nuclear physics research under the RFR; in December 1943, Esau was replaced by Walther Gerlach. In the final analysis, placing the RFR under Göring's administrative control had little effect on the German nuclear weapon project.

Speer states that the project to develop the atom bomb was scuttled in the autumn of 1942. Though the scientific solution was there, it would have taken all of Germany's production resources to produce a bomb, and then no sooner than 1947. Development did continue with a "uranium motor" for the navy and development of a German cyclotron. However, by the summer of 1943, Speer released the remaining 1200 metric tons of uranium stock for the production of solid-core ammunition.

Over time, the HWA and then the RFR controlled the German nuclear weapon project. The most influential people were Kurt Diebner, Abraham Esau, Walther Gerlach, and Erich Schumann. Schumann was one of the most powerful and influential physicists in Germany. He was director of the Physics Department II at the Frederick William University (later, University of Berlin), which was commissioned and funded by the Oberkommando des Heeres (OKH, Army High Command) to conduct physics research projects. He was also head of the research department of the HWA, assistant secretary of the Science Department of the OKW, and Bevollmächtigter (plenipotentiary) for high explosives. Diebner, throughout the life of the nuclear weapon project, had more control over nuclear fission research than did Walther Bothe, Klaus Clusius, Otto Hahn, Paul Harteck, or Werner Heisenberg.

== Isotope separation ==
Paul Peter Ewald, a member of the Uranverein, had proposed an electromagnetic isotope separator, which was thought applicable to ^{235}U production and enrichment. This was picked up by Manfred von Ardenne, who ran a private research establishment.

In 1928, von Ardenne had come into his inheritance with full control as to how it could be spent, and he established his private research laboratory the Forschungslaboratorium für Elektronenphysik, in Berlin-Lichterfelde, to conduct his own research on radio and television technology and electron microscopy. He financed the laboratory with income he received from his inventions and from contracts with other concerns. For example, his research on nuclear physics and high-frequency technology was financed by the Reichspostministerium (RPM, Reich Postal Ministry), headed by Wilhelm Ohnesorge. Von Ardenne attracted top-notch personnel to work in his facility, such as the nuclear physicist Fritz Houtermans, in 1940. Von Ardenne had also conducted research on isotope separation. Taking Ewald's suggestion he began building a prototype for the RPM. The work was hampered by war shortages and ultimately ended by the war.

Aside from the Uranverein and von Ardenne's team in Berlin-Lichterfelde, there was also a small research team in the Henschel Flugzeugwerke: the study group under the direction of Prof. Dr. Ing. Herbert Wagner (1900–1982) searched for alternative sources of energy for airplanes and became interested in nuclear energy in 1940. In August 1941, they finished a detailed internal survey of the history and potential of technical nuclear physics and its applications (Übersicht und Darstellung der historischen Entwicklung der modernen technischen Kernphysik und deren Anwendungsmöglichkeit sowie Zusammenfassung eigener Arbeitsziele und Pläne, signed by Herbert Wagner and Hugo Watzlawek (1912–1995) in Berlin. Their application to the Aviation Ministry (RLM) to found and fund an Institute for Nuclear Technology and Nuclear Chemistry (Reichsinstituts für Kerntechnik und Kernchemie) failed, but Watzlawek continued to explore potential applications of nuclear energy and wrote a detailed textbook on technical nuclear physics. It includes one of the most detailed presentations of contemporary German knowledge about the various processes of isotope separation, and recommends their combined usage to get to sufficient amounts of enriched uranium. Walther Gerlach refused to print this textbook, but it is preserved as a typed manuscript and it appeared after the War in 1948 virtually unchanged (with just a few additions on the US atomic bomb released in 1945). In October 1944, Hugo Watzlawek wrote an article on the potential usage of nuclear energy and its many potential applications. In his view, to follow up this route of research and development was the "new pathway" to becoming the "Master of the World".

== Moderator production ==
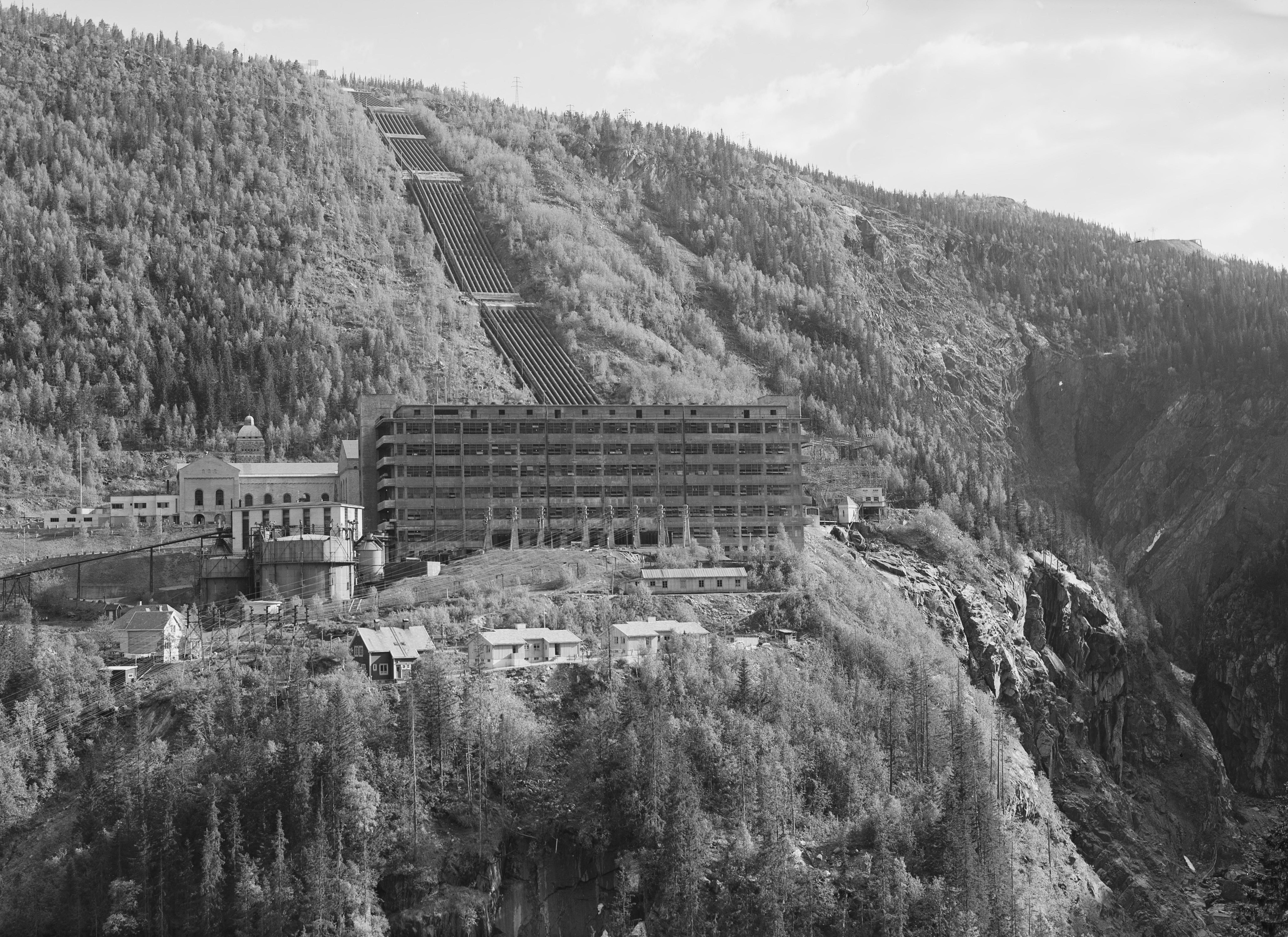
The Vemork plant at Norsk Hydro, Norway, after the war. The heavy water was produced in the front building, the Hydrogen Production Plant.

The production of heavy water was already under way in Norway when the Germans invaded on 9 April 1940. The Norwegian production facilities for heavy water were quickly secured (though some heavy water had already been removed) and improved by the Germans. The Allies and Norwegians had sabotaged Norwegian heavy water production and destroyed stocks of heavy water by 1943. In November 1943, the 800,000 RM were allocated for the development of a German heavy water plant. A pilot plant project was operated by IG Farben at their Leuna Werke ammonia plant in Merseburg, run by Paul Herold, but the increasing strain of allied air raids against Germany made such projects increasingly difficult, and no apparent success was achieved.

Graphite (carbon) as an alternative was not considered, because the neutron absorption coefficient value for carbon calculated by Walther Bothe was too high, probably due to the boron in the graphite pieces having high neutron absorption.

== Exploitation and denial strategies ==
Near the end of World War II, the principal Allied war powers each made plans for exploitation of German science. In light of the implications of nuclear weapons, German nuclear fission and related technologies were singled out for special attention. In addition to exploitation, denial of these technologies, their personnel, and related materials to rival allies was a driving force of their efforts. This typically meant getting to these resources first, which to some extent put the Soviets at a disadvantage in some geographic locations easily reached by the Western Allies, even if the area was allotted to the Soviet zone of occupation at the Potsdam Conference. At times, all parties were heavy-handed in their pursuit and denial to others.

The best known US effort was Operation Paperclip, a broad dragnet that encompassed a wide range of advanced fields, including jet and rocket propulsion, nuclear physics, and other developments with military applications such as infrared technology. Operations directed specifically towards German nuclear fission were Operation Alsos and Operation Epsilon, the latter being done in collaboration with the British. In lieu of the codename for the Soviet operation, it is referred to by the historian Oleynikov as the Russian "Alsos".

=== American and British ===
Berlin had been a location of many German scientific research facilities. To limit casualties and loss of equipment, many of these facilities were dispersed to other locations in the later years of the war.

==== Operation Big ====
Unfortunately for the Soviets, the Kaiser-Wilhelm-Institut für Physik (KWIP, Kaiser Wilhelm Institute for Physics) had mostly been moved in 1943 and 1944 to Hechingen and its neighboring town of Haigerloch, on the edge of the Black Forest, which eventually became the French occupation zone. This move allowed the Americans to take into custody a large number of German scientists associated with nuclear research. The only section of the institute which remained in Berlin was the low-temperature physics section, headed by Ludwig Bewilogua, who was in charge of the experimental uranium pile.

American Alsos teams carrying out Operation Big raced through Baden-Württemberg near the war's end in 1945, uncovering, collecting, and selectively destroying Uranverein elements, including capturing a prototype reactor at Haigerloch and records, heavy water, and uranium ingots at Tailfingen (today part of Albstadt). These were all shipped to the US for study and utilization in the US atomic program. Although many of these materials remain unaccounted for, the National Museum of Nuclear Science & History displayed a cube of uranium attained from this mission from March 2020.

==== Operation Epsilon, and Farm Hall ====
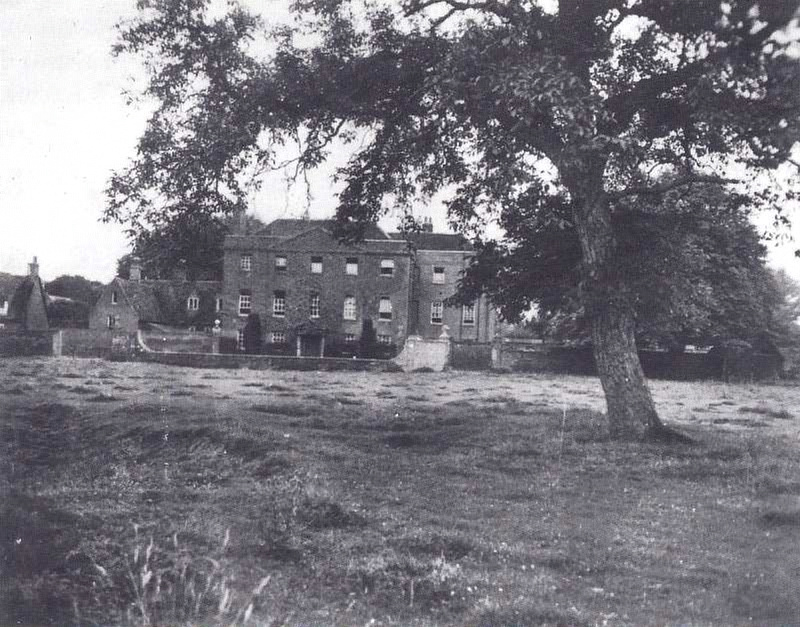
Farm Hall, Godmanchester

A major goal of the Operation Alsos effort in Germany was the location, capture, and interrogation of German nuclear scientists. This involved some significant effort as many of them had become scattered during the chaotic last weeks of the war in Europe. Ultimately, nine of the prominent German scientists who published reports in Kernphysikalische Forschungsberichte as members of the Uranverein were picked up by the Alsos team and incarcerated in England as part of what was called Operation Epsilon: Erich Bagge, Kurt Diebner, Walther Gerlach, Otto Hahn, Paul Harteck, Werner Heisenberg, Horst Korsching, Carl Friedrich von Weizsäcker, and Karl Wirtz. Also incarcerated was Max von Laue, although he had nothing to do with the nuclear weapon project. Goudsmit, the chief scientific advisor to Operation Alsos, thought von Laue might be beneficial to the post-war rebuilding of Germany and would benefit from the high level contacts he would have in England.

The ten scientists were secretly relocated and kept confined and incommunicado with the broader world in Farm Hall, a manor house in Godmanchester. The legal authority for this, the legal status of the prisoners, and the ultimate intentions of the British were unclear to all involved, to the great discomfort of the scientists. The manor house was wired with covert listening devices, and conversations between the German scientists were monitored and translated into English. It is unclear whether the scientists were aware, or whether they suspected, that they were being monitored.

Prior to the announcement of Hiroshima, the German scientists, though worried about the future, expressed confidence in their value to the Allies on the basis of their advanced knowledge of nuclear matters. The British then told the scientists that the BBC had announced the use of the atomic bomb after the attack on Hiroshima. Reactions from the Germans varied; Hahn expressed guilt for his role in the discovery of nuclear fission, while many others, including Heisenberg, expressed incredulity at the report ("I don’t believe a word of the whole thing"). Later that evening, the scientists were allowed to listen to a longer BBC announcement, which invited further debate. Throughout all of this, Heisenberg made arguments that it would take very large amounts of enriched uranium ("about a ton") to make such a weapon. In justifying his reasoning, he gave a brief explanation of how one would calculate the critical mass for an atomic bomb which contained serious errors.

The transcripts were declassified in 1992, and this particular section of discussion was subjected to expert scrutiny. Two scientists on the Manhattan Project, Edward Teller and Hans Bethe, concluded after reading the transcripts that Heisenberg had never done the calculation before. Heisenberg himself, in the transcript, said that, "quite honestly I have never worked it [the critical mass calculation for an atomic bomb] out as I never believed one could get pure [uranium-]235." A week after the bombing, Heisenberg had given a more formal lecture to his colleagues on the physics of the atomic bomb, which corrected many of his early mistakes and indicated a much smaller critical mass. Historians have cited Heisenberg's error as evidence of the degree to which his role in the project had been confined almost entirely to reactors, as the original equation is much more similar to how a reactor would work than to an atomic bomb.

At Farm Hall, the German scientists discussed why Germany did not create an atomic bomb, and the United States and United Kingdom did. The transcripts reveal them developing what has been called the Lesart ("viewpoint"). The Lesart argued that the German scientists chose not to build a bomb for Hitler, either by dragging their feet, being insufficiently enthusiastic, or, in some versions, active sabotage. The Lesart both offers up an explanation for their "failure" and also elevates their moral authority above the Allied scientists, despite the fact that they worked for the Nazis. After the war, von Weizsäcker and Heisenberg and several others spread this version of the story to journalists and historians, like Robert Jungk, who reprinted and amplified it uncritically in the 1950s. Already by that time, the historical accuracy of the Lesart had been challenged forcefully by von Laue (who coined the term Lesart) and nowadays most professional historians of science with knowledge of the subject do not believe that the Lesart is true. As the historian and physicist Jeremy Bernstein put it in an annotated edition of the Farm Hall transcripts:

What the Farm Hall reports make transparently clear is that, while they knew a few general principles — the use of fast fission from separated ^{235}U and the possibility of plutonium — they had not seriously investigated any of the details. All of the really hard problems were left untackled and unsolved. ... They had decided that making a bomb in wartime Germany was unfeasible on technical and economic grounds. It was simply too big and too costly. Morality had nothing to do with it.

The Lesart has been perpetuated in many popular accounts of the German nuclear program, notably in Michael Frayn's 1998 play Copenhagen, which itself was based heavily on the Lesart-endorsing work of popular history, Heisenberg's War (1993), by the journalist Thomas Powers.

==== Oranienburg plant ====
With the interest of the Heereswaffenamt (HWA, Army Ordnance Office), Nikolaus Riehl, and his colleague Günter Wirths, set up an industrial-scale production of high-purity uranium oxide at the Auergesellschaft plant in Oranienburg. Adding to the capabilities in the final stages of metallic uranium production were the strengths of the Degussa corporation's capabilities in metals production.

The Oranienburg plant provided the uranium sheets and cubes for the Uranmaschine experiments conducted at the KWIP and the Versuchsstelle (testing station) of the Heereswaffenamt (Army Ordnance Office) in Gottow. The G-1 experiment performed at the HWA testing station, under the direction of Kurt Diebner, had lattices of 6,800 uranium oxide cubes (about 25 tons), in the nuclear moderator paraffin.

Work of the American Operation Alsos teams, in November 1944, uncovered leads which took them to a company in Paris that handled rare earths and had been taken over by the Auergesellschaft. This, combined with information gathered in the same month through an Alsos team in Strasbourg, confirmed that the Oranienburg plant was involved in the production of uranium and thorium metals. Since the plant was to be in the future Soviet zone of occupation and the Red Army's troops would get there before the Western Allies, General Leslie Groves, commander of the Manhattan Project, recommended to General George Marshall that the plant be destroyed by aerial bombardment, in order to deny its uranium production equipment to the Soviets. On 15 March 1945, 612 B-17 Flying Fortress bombers of the Eighth Air Force dropped 1,506 tons of high-explosive and 178 tons of incendiary bombs on the plant. Riehl visited the site with the Soviets and said that the facility was mostly destroyed. Riehl also recalled long after the war that the Soviets knew precisely why the Americans had bombed the facility—the attack had been directed at them rather than the Germans.

=== French ===
From 1941 to 1947, Fritz Bopp was a staff scientist at the KWIP, and worked with the Uranverein. In 1944, he went with most of the KWIP staff when they were evacuated to Hechingen in Southern Germany due to air raids on Berlin, and became the institute's deputy director. When the American Alsos Mission evacuated Hechingen and Haigerloch, near the end of World War II, French armed forces occupied Hechingen. Bopp did not get along with them and described the initial French policy objectives towards the KWIP as exploitation, forced evacuation to France, and seizure of documents and equipment. The French occupation policy was not qualitatively different from that of the American and Soviet occupation forces, it was just carried out on a smaller scale. In order to put pressure on Bopp to evacuate the KWIP to France, the French Naval Commission imprisoned him for five days and threatened him with further imprisonment if he did not cooperate in the evacuation. During his imprisonment, the spectroscopist Hermann Schüler , who had a better relationship with the French, persuaded the French to appoint him as deputy director of the KWIP. This incident caused tension between the physicists and spectroscopists at the KWIP and within its umbrella organization the Kaiser-Wilhelm Gesellschaft (Kaiser Wilhelm Society).

=== Soviet ===
At the close of World War II, the Soviet Union had special search teams operating in Austria and Germany, especially in Berlin, to identify and obtain equipment, material, intellectual property, and personnel useful to the Soviet atomic bomb project. The exploitation teams were under the Soviet Alsos and they were headed by Lavrentiy Beria's deputy, Colonel General A. P. Zavenyagin. These teams were composed of scientific staff members, in NKVD officer's uniforms, from the bomb project's only laboratory, Laboratory No. 2, in Moscow, and included Yulij Borisovich Khariton, Isaak Konstantinovich Kikoin, and Lev Andreevich Artsimovich. Georgij Nikolaevich Flerov had arrived earlier, although Kikoin did not recall a vanguard group. Targets on the top of their list were the Kaiser-Wilhelm Institut für Physik (KWIP, Kaiser Wilhelm Institute for Physics), the Frederick William University (today, the University of Berlin), and the Technische Hochschule in Charlottenburg (now Technische Universität Berlin).

German physicists who worked on the Uranverein and were sent to the Soviet Union to work on the Soviet atomic bomb project included: Werner Czulius, Robert Döpel, Walter Herrmann, Heinz Pose, Ernst Rexer, Nikolaus Riehl, and Karl Zimmer. Günter Wirths, while not a member of the Uranverein, worked for Riehl at the Auergesellschaft on reactor-grade uranium production and was also sent to the Soviet Union.

Zimmer's path to work on the Soviet atomic bomb project was through a prisoner of war camp in Krasnogorsk, as was that of his colleagues Hans-Joachim Born and Alexander Catsch from the Kaiser-Wilhelm Institut für Hirnforschung (KWIH, Kaiser Wilhelm Institute for Brain Research, today the Max-Planck-Institut für Hirnforschung), who worked there for N. V. Timofeev-Resovskij, director of the Abteilung für Experimentelle Genetik (Department of Experimental Genetics). All four eventually worked for Riehl in the Soviet Union at Laboratory B.

Von Ardenne, who had worked on isotope separation for the Reichspostministerium (Reich Postal Ministry), was also sent to the Soviet Union to work on their atomic bomb project, along with Gustav Hertz, Nobel laureate and director of Research Laboratory II at Siemens, Peter Adolf Thiessen, director of the Kaiser-Wilhelm Institut für physikalische Chemie und Elektrochemie (KWIPC, Kaiser Wilhelm Institute for Chemistry and Electrochemistry, today the Fritz Haber Institute of the Max-Planck Society), and Max Volmer, director of the Physical Chemistry Institute at the Technische Hochschule in Charlottenburg (now Technische Universität Berlin), who all had made a pact that whoever first made contact with the Soviets would speak for the rest. Before the end of World War II, Thiessen, a member of the Nazi Party, had Communist contacts. On 27 April 1945, Thiessen arrived at von Ardenne's institute in an armored vehicle with a major of the Soviet Army, who was also a leading Soviet chemist, and they issued Ardenne a protective letter (Schutzbrief).

== Comparison to the Manhattan Project ==
The United States, British, and Canadian governments worked together to create the Manhattan Project that developed the uranium and plutonium atomic bombs. Its success has been attributed to meeting all four of the following conditions:

1. A strong initial drive, by a small group of scientists, to launch the project.
2. Unconditional government support from a certain point in time.
3. Essentially unlimited manpower and industrial resources.
4. A concentration of brilliant scientists devoted to the project.

Even with all four of these conditions in place, the Manhattan Project succeeded only after the war in Europe had been brought to a conclusion.

In comparison to the Manhattan Project, mutual distrust existed between the German government and some scientists. By the end of 1941, it was already apparent among German science and military elites that the German nuclear weapon project would not make a decisive contribution to ending the German war effort in the near term, and control of the project was relinquished by the Heereswaffenamt (HWA, Army Ordnance Office) to the Reichsforschungsrat (RFR, Reich Research Council) in July 1942.

As to condition four, the high priority allocated to the Manhattan Project allowed for the recruitment and concentration of capable scientists on the project. In Germany, on the other hand, a great many young scientists and technicians who would have been of great use to such a project were conscripted into the German armed forces, while others had fled the country before the war due to antisemitism and political persecution.

Whereas Enrico Fermi, a scientific Manhattan Project leader, had a "unique double aptitude for theoretical and experimental work" in the 20th century, the successes at Leipzig until 1942 resulted from the cooperation between the theoretical physicist Werner Heisenberg and the experimentalist Robert Döpel. Most important was their experimental proof of an effective neutron increase in April 1942. At the end of July of the same year, the group around Fermi also succeeded in the neutron increase within a reactor-like arrangement.

In June 1942, some six months before the American Chicago Pile-1 achieved man-made criticality for the first time anywhere, Döpel's L-IV "Uran-Maschine" was destroyed by a chemical explosion introduced by oxygen, which finished the work on this topic at Leipzig. Thereafter, despite increased expenditures, the Berlin groups and their external branches did not succeed in getting a reactor critical until the end of World War II. However, this goal of criticality was realized by the Fermi group in December 1942, so that the German advantage was definitively lost, even with respect to research on energy production.

German historian Klaus Hentschel summarizes the organizational differences as:

Compared with the British and American war research efforts united in the Manhattan Project, to this day the prime example of "big science," the Uranverein was only a loosely knit, decentralized network of researchers with quite different research agendas. Rather than teamwork as on the American end, on the German side we find cut-throat competition, personal rivalries, and fighting over the limited resources.

The Manhattan Project's Alsos investigation ultimately concluded in a classified report, on the basis of documents and materials confiscated from research sites in Germany, Austria, and France, as well as interrogation of over 40 personnel connected with the program, that:

The general plan of conducting the subject research [developing an atomic weapon] in some respects followed a pattern employed in the United States. Research assignments were farmed out to many small groups, generally of some university or technical school, or to industrial firms specializing in one or more of the related activities. However, the enemy effort was definitely lacking in overall direction, unity of purpose and coordination between participating agencies. Early in the German endeavor the uranium problem had been separately approached by a number of more or less competing groups. There was one group under Army Ordnance, another under the Kaiser-Wilhelm Institute for Physics, and still another under the Postal Department. A certain amount of bickering over the supply of material and a non-cooperative attitude in the exchange of information existed between those groups. The research efforts of the Postal Department amounted to little and did not continue for very long. The first two of the above groups were unified in 1942 under the Reich's Research Council. On the whole, beneficial results, from the German standpoint, were obtained through that unification. But conflicting jurisdiction between the German Government and Service branches still existed. Up until the later stages of the war difficulties were apparent in regard to the deferment of scientific personnel from military service. Many German scientists worked along their own lines and were not required to work at particular projects. Development of atomic weapon was not believed to be possible [during the war].

As a consequence of the foregoing, atomic energy development in Germany did not pass beyond the laboratory stage; utilization for power production rather than for an explosive was the principal consideration; and, though German science was interested in this new field, other scientific objectives received greater official attention.

In terms of financial and human resources, the comparisons between the Manhattan Project and the Uranverein are stark. The Manhattan Project consumed some US$2 billion (1945, ~US$28 billion in 2024 dollars) in government funds, and employed at its peak some 120,000 people, mostly in the sectors of construction and operations. In total the Manhattan Project involved the labor of some 500,000 people, nearly 1% of the entire US civilian labor force. By comparison, the Uranverein was budgeted a mere 8 million reichsmarks, equivalent to about US$2 million (1945,~US$28 million in 2024 dollars) – a thousandth of the American expenditure.

== In popular culture ==
The 2023 film Oppenheimer depicts the Manhattan Project scientists' awareness of the German program, including the visit of Niels Bohr to Los Alamos.

The 2018 film The Catcher Was a Spy depicts the potential assassination mission of American baseball player spy Moe Berg targeting lead German physicist Werner Heisenberg.

The 2015–2019 TV series The Man in the High Castle depicts a hypothetical Axis victory, in which Germany destroys Washington, D.C. with an atomic bomb in December 1945.

== See also ==
- Germany and weapons of mass destruction
- Japanese nuclear weapons program
- Alsos Mission
- Operation Paperclip
