= Albert Vögler =

German politician, industrialist and entrepreneur (1877–1945)

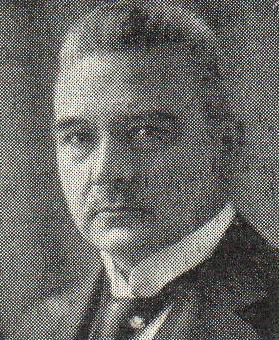
- Vögler portrait from Meyers Blitz-Lexikon 1932
- Born: Albert Vögler; 8 February 1877; Essen, Rhine Province, Kingdom of Prussia, German Empire
- Died: 14 April 1945 (aged 68); Herdecke, Allied-occupied Germany
- Cause of death: Suicide by cyanide poisoning
- Occupations: Industrialist, politician
- Employer(s): Dortmunder Steel Works, Deutsch-Luxemburgische Bergwerks- und Hütten-AG mining company, Vereinigte Stahlwerke AG
- Political party: German People's Party (member, co-founder)
- Board member of: Dortmunder Chamber of Commerce, Rheinisch Westfäli coal syndicate

Albert Vögler (8 February 1877 – 14 April 1945) was a German politician, industrialist and entrepreneur. He was a co-founder of the German People's Party, and an important executive in the munitions industry during World War II.

Vögler was born to Karl and Berta Vögler in Essen. He studied mechanics and engineering at high school before graduating from the University of Karlsruhe in 1901 with a degree in mechanical engineering. Between 1901 and 1910 he worked as a senior engineer at the Dortmunder Steel Works, and then became a member of the executive committee in the Deutsch-Luxemburgische Bergwerks- und Hütten-AG mining company. Upon the death in 1924 of the founder, Hugo Stinnes, Vögler became manager.

In 1918, with Gustav Stresemann, Vögler was involved in the founding of the German People's Party (DVP) in the Weimar Republic and sat as a Reichstag deputy for the DVP from electoral constituency 18 (Westphalia South) from 1920 to 1924, when he left the party. Between 1925 and 1927, he was a member of the Dortmund Chamber of Commerce and president of the Rheinisch Westfäli coal syndicate. In 1926, Vögler founded the Vereinigte Stahlwerke AG and was its chairman until 1935. In 1927, he also became an honorary board member of his old university in Karlsruhe. He also served as the president of the agricultural company called KWS.

As an industrialist who financed the Nazis, Vögler was a member of the Freundeskreis der Wirtschaft. He killed himself at the end of the war.

== Nazi politics ==
As a business man, Vögler feared the rise of communism in Germany. Records of donations from Vögler to the Nazi Party from as early as 1931 exist. Vögler met Adolf Hitler on 11 September 1931. From 1932, Vögler openly funded the Nazi Party. He was a member of the Freundeskreis Himmler.

Hitler became German Chancellor on 30 January 1933. He held a meeting with Hermann Göring and German industrialists on 20 February 1933. Vögler was present at this meeting. Hitler presented the Nazi Party's political plans, and received a total of three million marks in donations. During the latter part of the 1930s, Vögler was described by the Jewish businessman Max von der Porten as one of the industrialists who focused primarily on business, hardly spoke of politics and did not want to know anything about it.

In November 1933, Vögler was again elected from Westphalia South as one of the few "guest" members of the Nazi-dominated Reichstag and he retained that seat until the fall of the Nazi regime. In the 1938 Reichstag handbook, he is identified as a Nazi Party deputy.

From 1940, Vögler was involved in the manufacture of munitions. He acted as the unofficial scientific advisor to Reichsmarshall Göring. In mid-1942, he persuaded the Minister of Armaments and War Production Albert Speer to transfer the Reichsforschungsrat (Reich Research Council), which oversaw the Nazi German nuclear programme, from Bernhard Rust's Reich Ministry of Science, Education and Culture to Göring as the Oberkommando der Luftwaffe (supreme commander of the Luftwaffe). He served in increasingly important positions under Speer in the Ruhr industrial heartland from 1942 until 1944. He helped rationalize armament production and increase output at a time when Germany was clearly losing the war, following the defeat at the Battle of Stalingrad, the Battle of El Alamein and the Battle of Kursk. The armaments industry used much forced labour, as well as slave labour, so costs of manufacture were minimal. He was president of the Kaiser Wilhelm Society (later Max Planck Society) from 1941 until his death in 1945.

== Nuremberg trials ==
On 14 April 1945, to avoid capture by the advancing US Army, Vögler committed suicide via a cyanide pill in Haus Ende, Herdecke. Despite his death, he was still identified as one of the defendants in the Nuremberg trials of prominent industrialists, which prosecuted the clique of businessmen who helped Hitler.

== See also ==
- Secret Meeting of 20 February 1933
