= Erich Schumann =

German physicist (1898–1985)

Erich Schumann (5 January 1898 – 25 April 1985) was a German physicist who specialized in acoustics and explosives, and had a penchant for music. He was a general officer in the army and a professor at the University of Berlin and the Technische Hochschule Berlin. When Adolf Hitler came to power he joined the Nazi Party. During World War II, his positions in the Army Ordnance Office and the Army High Command made him one of the most powerful and influential physicists in Germany. He ran the German nuclear energy program from 1939 to 1942, when the army relinquished control to the Reich Research Council. His role in the project was obfuscated after the war by the German physics community's defense of its conduct during the war. The publication of his book on the military's role in the project was not allowed by the British occupation authorities. He was director of the Helmholtz Institute of Sound Psychology and Medical Acoustics.

== Education ==
Schumann was born in Potsdam, Brandenburg. He studied at the Frederick William University (today the Humboldt University of Berlin) under the acoustician and musicologist Carl Stumpf and the physicist Max Planck. In 1922, he received his doctorate there in systematic musicology (acoustics). He completed his Habilitation on acoustics there in 1929; members of his Habilitation committee for experimental and theoretical physics included the eminent scientists Walther Nernst, Max von Laue, and Max Planck.

== Career ==
=== Overview ===
From 1922, Schumann was a physicist at the Reichswehrministerium (RWM, Reich Ministry of Defense), which became the Reichskriegsministerium (RKM, Reich Ministry of War) in 1939. He passed the Referendar (civil service exam) in 1926. From 1929, he was head of the RWM Central Science Office and from 1932 ministerial councilor there.

In 1929, when he completed his Habilitation at the University of Berlin, he was appointed lecturer of systematic musicology (acoustics). In 1931, he became an extraordinarius professor of experimental and theoretical physics there, and in 1933 he became an ordinarius professor of applied physics and systematic musicology. Schumann taught courses on acoustics and explosives, his areas of research. Schumann was the doctoral advisor to Wernher von Braun, who was awarded his doctorate in 1934.

In 1933, the year Adolf Hitler came to power, Schumann became a member of the Nazi Party.

From 1933 until 1945, Schumann was director of the newly established Physics Department II of the University of Berlin, which was commissioned by the Oberkommando des Heeres (OKW, Army High Command) to conduct research projects they funded. Concurrently, from 1934, he was head of the research department for the Heereswaffenamt (HWA, Army Ordnance Office) and assistant secretary in the Science Department of the RKM, then from 1938 to 1945 of the OKW. Additionally, in the autumn of 1938, he was appointed an ordinarius professor of ballistics and military technology at the Technische Hochschule Berlin (today Technische Universität Berlin). From 1942 to 1945, he was on the Reichsforschungsrat (RFR, Reich Research Council) and was also the Bevollmächtiger (plenipotentiary) for high explosives.

Schumann, a general officer in the army and an ordinarius professor in academia, skillfully projected his power as a science policymaker for Germany. He enjoyed both roles, as remembered by the nuclear physicist Georg Hartwig, and dressed appropriately to gain advantage. For example, when he met with academia representatives, he wore his military uniform and saluted. When meeting with military officials, he dressed in mufti and was introduced as Herr Professor Doktor.

=== Uranverein ===
From September 1939 to 1942 the HWA controlled the German nuclear energy project, also known at the Uranverein (Uranium Club); in 1942 control was turned over to the RFR. The most influential people in the project were Schumann, Abraham Esau, Walther Gerlach, and Kurt Diebner, Schumann, during this period, was one of the most powerful and influential physicists in Germany.

When it was apparent that the nuclear energy project would not make a decisive contribution to ending the war effort in the near term by producing a nuclear weapon, the HWA had decided by January 1942 to relinquish its control of the nuclear energy project and leave it in the realm of research through the RFR. Even then, Schumann helped the project dodge what would have been a major blow to the project. Many scientists in the Uranverein working on the Uranmaschine (uranium machine, i.e., nuclear reactor) had the classification of unabkömmlich (uk, indispensable) and were exempt from being drafted into armed service. Both Paul Harteck and Carl Friedrich von Weizsäcker had the classification uk. However, as the war raged on, the demand for men to provide armed service caused both to be called up in January 1942 for service at the Russian front. Paul O. Müller and Karl-Heinz Höcker, colleagues of von Weizsäcker within the Uranverein had already been called up; Müller was killed on the Russian front. Werner Heisenberg, with the help of Schuman and Karl-Friedrich Bonhoeffer, whose brother-in-law Hans von Dohnanyi held an influential position in the German army, managed to maintain the uk status for Harteck and von Weizsäcker and keep them working on the nuclear energy project.

=== Biological Warfare ===
Although Hitler had ordered that biological warfare should be studied only for the purpose of defending against it, Schumann lobbied for him to be persuaded otherwise: "America must be attacked simultaneously with various human and animal epidemic pathogens, as well as plant pests." The plans were never adopted due to opposition by Hitler.

=== Post World War II ===
In the German scientific community's defense of its conduct during the war, the military's Schumann- and Diebner-led aspects of the Uranverein were minimized, ridiculed, and ascribed to Nichtskönner (incompetent scientists) and leadership that owed its positions to politics. Additionally, the Heisenberg component of the project was made to appear as the leading and dominant element of the project. The motivations of the German scientists were to distance themselves from the military aspects of the Uranverein and, in the denazification environment, also distance themselves from those who had visible positions under National Socialism. Regarding Schumann's scientific abilities, they are, however, attested to by the fact that members of his Habilitation committee for experimental and theoretical physics at the University of Berlin included the eminent scientists Max von Laue, Walther Nernst, and Max Planck, and the Habilitation was well before Hitler came to power.

After the war, Schumann wrote a book to get out his view of the German nuclear energy project, but publication was blocked by the British occupation authorities. Telling of some of the story from this perspective would have to wait until his right-hand man in the HWA, Kurt Diebner, published his book in 1957.

Again from 1951, Schumann was director of the Helmholtz Institute of Sound Psychology and Medical Acoustics in Berlin. He died in Homberg-Hülsa in 1985.
