= Emil Leeb =

German general (1881-1969)

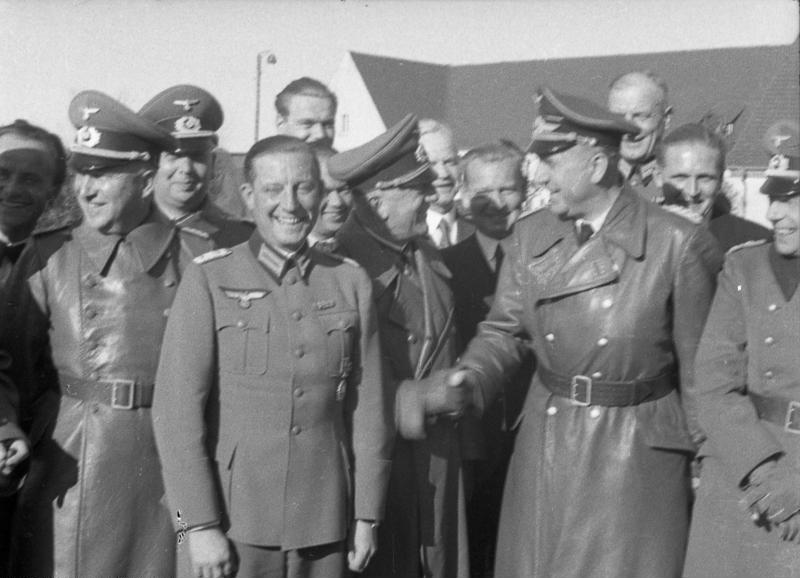
- Leeb mid of picture, handshaking with Fritz Todt
- Born: 17 June 1881; Passau
- Died: 8 September 1969 (aged 88); Munich
- Relatives: Wilhelm Ritter von Leeb (brother)
- Military career
- Allegiance: German Empire; Weimar Republic; Nazi Germany
- Branch: German Army
- Service years: 1901–1945
- Rank: General der Artillerie
- Commands: Commander of Military District XI; Chief of the Waffenamt
- Conflicts: World War I

Emil Leeb (17 June 1881 – 8 September 1969) was a German General during the Second World War. A professional soldier, he saw active service during both World Wars. Leeb's older brother Wilhelm Ritter von Leeb was a Generalfeldmarschall (Field Marshal) of the Wehrmacht during the Second World War.

== First World War ==
Leeb entered Army service on 7 July 1901. He attended the War School in Munich, the Bavarian Artillery & Engineer School, and then the Bavarian War Academy. Before and during World War I, Leeb served as an adjutant in artillery units and then was appointed a General Staff officer. Leeb was promoted to captain on 1 June 1915. In June 1917, he was transferred to the General staff in the XVth Royal Bavarian Reserve Corps and an infantry division. Leeb participated in battles around Lorraine, Northern France, Galicia, the Carpathian Mountains, Flanders and the German withdrawal from Northern France. Leeb's older brother, Wilhelm Ritter von Leeb, had the knightly rank of "Ritter" and the nobiliary particle of "von", not by birth, but thanks to the conferment of the Bavarian Military Order of Max Joseph and a patent of nobility. Hence, the older brother had "von" between his names, but the younger brother did not.

== Interwar period ==
Remaining in the downsized Reichswehr after the end of the war in November 1918, during 1919 Leeb served as a staff officer with the 4th Bavarian Field Artillery Regiment, the Detachment Hierl (Freikorps), the 24th Reichswehr Brigade, Niederwerfung des Spartacus Aufstandes in Bavaria, before a posting to the German War Ministry (1 October 1919 – 1 October 1921), an artillery regiment (1 October 1921 – 1 October 1924), and the War Academy (7th Division) in Munich (1924 - 1 October 1928). He was promoted to Major on 1 February 1925. Between 1929 and 1933, Leeb served as commander of the Mountain Transport and Observation Squadron in Landsberg. He became a supply officer (Provision Matters) in the War Ministry (1 April 1933 – 1 April 1936), before promotion to Generalmajor on 1 July 1935, and later was given command of the 15th Infantry Division (1 April 1936 – 1 April 1939) at Frankfurt-am-Main. After promotion to Generalleutnant in early 1937, he became Commanding General of the XI Army Corps (1 April 1939 – 16 April 1940) in Hanover, where he was responsible for recruiting, training, and mobilization. During this period he was promoted to General of the Artillery (1 April 1939) and also became commander of Military District XI (1 April 1939 – 31 August 1939).

== Second World War ==
Leeb took part in the invasion of Poland, with his XI Corps attacking towards Warsaw. He initially reported to Walther von Reichenau of the 10th Army, before his unit formed the left wing of Reichenau's drive towards Łódź. Later, his unit was transferred to Johannes Blaskowitz's 8th Army in its attack from the east-central region of Germany into west-central Poland, before sweeping on towards Warsaw. On 15 April 1940, Leeb became Chief of the Waffenamt (Army Ordnance Weapons Depot) at the War Ministry in Berlin (15 April 1940 – 1 January 1945). His predecessor, Karl Becker, had committed suicide because he was unable to properly supply the field units with ammunition. During this period, Leeb also served as an advisor to the Works Company for Weapons and Mechanical Engineering, which was directed by Hermann Göring in Berlin (17 January 1941 – 29 December 1942), and he then served as a member of the Armaments Advisory Service (December 1942 - 1 May 1945). In late 1944, Leeb's section became part of Heinrich Himmler's Replacement Army. Leeb retired on 1 May 1945, the day following Adolf Hitler's death.
