= Deutsch-Luxemburgische Bergwerks- und Hütten-AG =

Former mining and steel conglomerate

- Industry: Mining
- Predecessor: Lorraine-Luxembourg Steelworks Association
- Founded: 1901
- Founders: Bernhard Dernburg; Hugo Stinnes
- Defunct: 1926
- Fate: Merged with Vereinigte Stahlwerke AG
- Successor: Vereinigte Stahlwerke AG; Gelsenkirchener Bergwerks-AG
- Headquarters: Bochum, German Empire
- Key people: Albert Vögler (CEO)

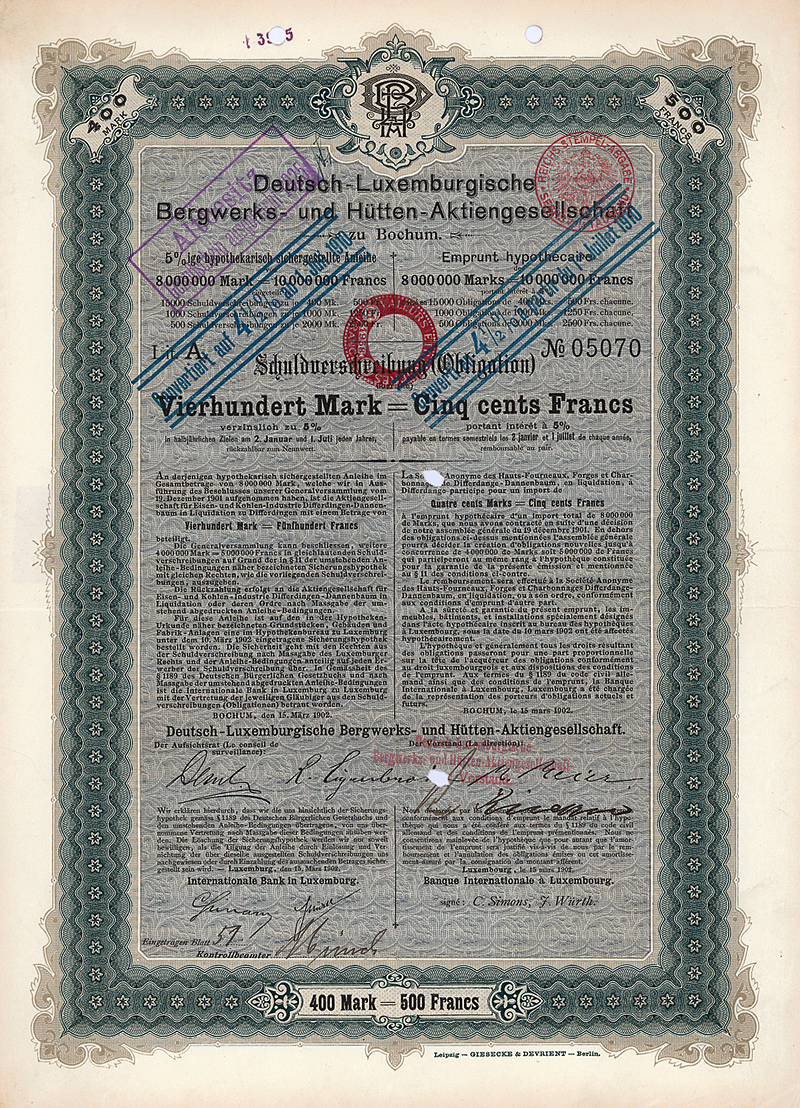
Loan note for 400 Marks of the Deutsch-Luxemburgische Bergwerks- und Hütten-AG from 15 March 1902

The Deutsch-Luxemburgische Bergwerks- und Hütten-AG ("German-Luxembourg Mining and Iron Company") sometimes abbreviated as DL was one of the largest vertically integrated mining conglomerates in Germany at the beginning of the 20th century. Its headquarters was located in Bochum.

The DL was a cornerstone of Hugo Stinnes' corporate empire. It was founded in 1901 at the initiative of Bernhard Dernburg and Hugo Stinnes as the successor to the Lorraine-Luxembourg Steelworks Association and grew rapidly through acquisitions and mergers. Due to its rapid expansion pace, it was always severely undercapitalised and financed itself through constant capital increases and bond issues.

The DL included the Dannenbaum, Friederika, Prinz Regent, Friedlicher Nachbar, Baaker Mulde, Hasenwinkel, and Julius Philipp pits. The company acquired additional coal sources through the acquisition of the Louise Tiefbau and Vereinigte Wittwe & Barop mines in Hombruch in 1908, the Dortmund Union and the Tremonia mine in 1910, as well as the Saar- und Mosel-Bergwerks-Gesellschaft (1910/1916).

It owned blast furnaces as well as steel and rolling mills located in Differdange (Luxembourg), in Dortmund after the acquisition of the Dortmunder Union, and after the conclusion of a consortium in 1911 also in Rumelange and St. Ingbert. The DL held the sole patent for the distribution of Grey beams in Germany. Vertical integration was further advanced by Stinnes through the acquisition of processing industries. For example, in 1911, the DL took over the Nordseewerke.

Hugo Stinnes GmbH played a significant role in the export of DL products.

Due to the regional division into various mining areas and distribution across different locations, the DL had a considerably more complex organisational structure than its competitors - such as August Thyssen's company Gewerkschaft Deutscher Kaiser or the Phönix AG für Bergbau und Hüttenbetrieb. However, it was also less susceptible to regional problems and could achieve advantages by skillfully shifting capacities and contingents.

After World War I, the DL lost its holdings in Luxembourg and Lorraine. Its Luxembourgish properties were taken over by Hadir, a new company with French and Belgian capital in 1920. In the same year, at the initiative of Stinnes and Albert Vögler, the DL merged with the Bochumer Verein and the Gelsenkirchener Bergwerks-AG (GBAG) to form a consortium under the name Rhein-Elbe-Union GmbH. This was expanded in 1920 with the participation of Siemens companies to form the Siemens-Rheinelbe-Schuckert-Union. On the one hand, the aim of these large vertical trusts was to undermine nationalisation efforts in the Weimar Republic; on the other hand, it was to efficiently process raw materials — scarce due to the political and social situation — thus achieving synergies and preventing production losses.

In 1926, the companies of the DL merged into the Vereinigte Stahlwerke AG and were later merged into the newly formed GBAG. The CEO of the DL, Albert Vögler, became the CEO of the Vereinigte Stahlwerke AG.
