= Peter Adolf Thiessen =

German physical chemist (1899–1990)

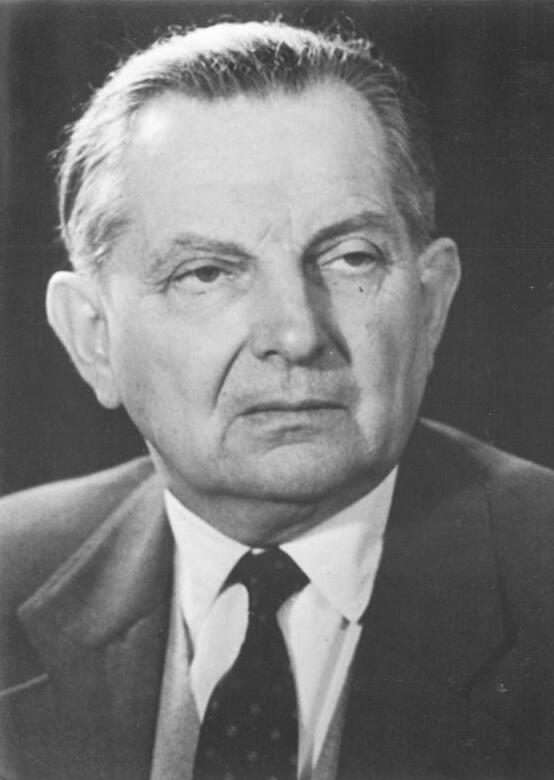
- Peter Adolf Thiessen (1899–1990) ca. 1960.
- Born: 6 April 1899; Schweidnitz, Silesia, Prussia, German Empire (present-day, in Świdnica, Lower Silesian, Poland)
- Died: 5 March 1990 (aged 90); East Berlin, East Germany
- Citizenship: Germany; East Germany
- Education: University of Freiburg; University of Greifswald; University of Göttingen
- Known for: Tribology; Soviet program of nuclear weapons
- Awards: Stalin Prize (1953); National Prize (1958)
- Scientific career
- Fields: Physical chemistry
- Workplaces: German Academy of Sciences at Berlin; German Research Foundation; Institute A in Russia; Kaiser-Wilhelm Gesellschaft; University of Göttingen; University of Münster; University of Berlin; Reichsforschungsrat
- Thesis: Kritische Untersuchungen am kolloidalen Gold (1924)
- Doctoral advisor: Richard Adolf Zsigmondy

Peter Adolf Thiessen (6 April 1899 – 5 March 1990) was a German physical chemist and a tribologist– he is credited as the founder of the tribochemistry.

At the close of the World War II, he voluntarily went to the Soviet Union and played a crucial role in advancing the Soviet program of nuclear weapons, and was a recipient of national honors of the Soviet Union. Upon his return to East Germany in 1956, Thiessen engaged his life in the advancement of applied applications of the physical chemistry.

== Education ==
Thiessen was born in Schweidnitz, Silesia, Prussia, which now is known as Świdnica, Lower Silesian in Poland, on 6 April 1899. Thiessen hailed from a wealthy German family, which owned a land in Schweidnitz.

From 1919 to 1923, he attended and studied chemistry at the University of Breslau, University of Freiburg, University of Greifswald, and the University of Göttingen. He received his doctorate in chemistry in 1923 under Richard Adolf Zsigmondy at Göttingen.

== Career ==
=== Early years ===
In 1923, Thiessen was a supernumerary assistant professor of chemistry at the University of Göttingen and from 1924 to 1930 was a regular professor. He joined the Nazi Party in 1925; and became a Privatdozent at Göttingen in 1926. In 1930, he became head of the department of inorganic chemistry there, and in 1932 he also became an untenured extraordinarius professor.

In 1933, Thiessen became a department chair of chemistry at the Kaiser-Wilhelm Institute for Physical Chemistry and Electrical Chemistry (KWIPC) of the Kaiser-Wilhelm Gesellschaft (KWG). For a short time in 1935, he became an ordinarius professor of chemistry at the University of Münster. Later, that year and until 1945, he became an ordinarius professor at the University of Berlin and director of the KWIPC in Berlin-Dahlem. As director of the KWIPC, he transformed it into a scientific model based on the Nazi Party's guidelines.

Thiessen was the main advisor and confidant to Rudolf Mentzel, who was head of the chemistry and organic materials section of the Reichsforschungsrat (RFR, Reich Research Council). Thiessen, as director of the KWIPC, had a flat on Faradayweg in Dahlem that the former director Fritz Haber used for business purposes; Thiessen shared this flat with Mentzel.

=== In the Soviet Union ===
Before the end of World War II, Thiessen had Communist contacts. He, Manfred von Ardenne, director of his private laboratory (Research Laboratory for Electron Physics), Gustav Hertz, Nobel Laureate and director of the second research laboratory at Siemens, and Max Volmer, ordinarius professor and director of the Physical Chemistry Institute at Technische Universität Berlin, had made a pact. The pact was a pledge that whoever first made contact with the Soviet authorities would speak for the rest. The objectives of their pact were threefold: (1) prevent plunder of their institutes, (2) continue their work with minimal interruption, and (3) protect themselves from prosecution for any political acts of the past. On 27 April 1945, Thiessen arrived at von Ardenne’s institute in an armored vehicle with a major of the Soviet Army, who was also a leading Soviet chemist. All four were taken into the Soviet custody and were held in Russia where Von Ardenne was made head of Institute A, in Sinop, a suburb of Sukhumi. Hertz was made head of Institute G, in Agudseri (Agudzery), about 10 km southeast of Sukhumi and a suburb of Gul’rips (Gulrip’shi). Volmer went to the Nauchno-Issledovatel’skij Institut-9 (NII-9, Scientific Research Institute No. 9), in Moscow; he was given a design bureau to work on the production of heavy water. In Institute A, Thiessen became leader for developing engineering design techniques for manufacturing porous barriers for isotope separation using the gaseous and centrifugal technologies.

In 1949, six German scientists, including Hertz, Thiessen, and Barwich, were called in for consultation at Sverdlovsk-44, which was responsible for uranium enrichment using the gaseous diffusion. The plant, which was smaller than the American Oak Ridge Laboratory's K-25 gaseous diffusion plant, was getting only a little over half of the expected 90pc or higher enrichment. Awards for uranium enrichment technologies were made in 1951 after testing of a bomb with uranium; the first test was with plutonium. Thiessen received a Stalin Prize, first class in 1953.

He is credited with founding the field of tribochemistry, which he formulated when encountering problems to make the gaseous diffusion method feasible for the Soviet nuclear weapons.

=== Return to East Germany ===
In 1953, Thiessen was notified by the Soviet administration in Russia that he would allowed to return to Germany but had to quarantined for at least two years, which was a standard practice for the German experts in Soviet program of nuclear weapons. He performed unclassified research in the Soviet Union and returned to East Germany in 1955 where he was elected as a Fellow of the German Academy of Sciences in East Berlin, and from 1956 was director of the Institute of Physical Chemistry in East Berlin. From 1957 to 1965, he was also chairman of the Research Council of the German Democratic Republic..

From 1965 till 1990, Thiessen served on different research capacities to advance the field of Tribology, for which he is credited as one of the founders, and died in East Berlin on 5 March 1990, aged 90.

== Books ==
- Peter Adolf Thiessen and Helmut Sandig Planung der Forschung (Dietz, 1961)
- Peter Adolf Thiessen Erfahrungen, Erkenntnisse, Folgerungen (Akademie-Verlag, 1979)
- Peter Adolf Thiessen Forschung und Praxis formen die neue Technik (Urania-Verl., 1961)
- Peter Adolf Thiessen Vorträge zum Festkolloquium anlässlich des 65. Geburtstages von P. A. Thiessen (Akademie-Verl., 1966)
- Peter Adolf Thiessen, Klaus Meyer, and Gerhard Heinicke Grundlagen der Tribochemie (Akademi-Verlar, 1967)

== Articles ==
- Peter Adolf Thiessen Die physikalische Chemie im nationalsozialistischen Staat, Der Deutscher Chemiker. Mitteilungen aus Stand / Beruf und Wissenschaft (Supplement to Angewandte Chemie. Zeitschrift des Vereins Deutsche Chemiker, No.19.) Volume 2, No. 5, May 9, 1936. Reprinted in English in Hentschel, Klaus (editor) and Ann M. Hentschel (editorial assistant and translator) Physics and National Socialism: An Anthology of Primary Sources (Birkhäuser, 1996) 134-137 as Document 48. Thiessen: Physical Chemistry in the National Socialist State [May 9, 1936].
