= Reichsforschungsrat =

The Reichsforschungsrat ("Imperial Research Council") was created in Germany in 1936 under the Education Ministry for the purpose of centralized planning of all basic and applied research, with the exception of aeronautical research. It was reorganized in 1942 and placed under the Ministry of Armaments and War Production.

== Creation ==
On the initiative of Erich Schumann, the Reichsforschungsrat (RFR, Reich Research Council) was inaugurated on 16 March 1937 by Reich Minister Bernhard Rust of the Reichserziehungsministerium (REM, Reich Education Ministry). The RFR was set up to centralize planning for all basic and applied research in Germany, with the exception of aeronautical research, which was under the supervision of Reich Marshal Hermann Göring. General Karl Heinrich Emil Becker, head of the Heereswaffenamt (HWA, Army Ordnance Office) and dean and professor in the faculty of defense technology at the Technische Hochschule Berlin, was its president (1937 to 1940). After Becker's death in 1940, Rust took over as president of the RFR. The vice-president was O. Wacker of the REM. In actuality, the direction of the RFR was carried out by Rudolf Mentzel, the president of the Deutsche Forschungs-Gemeinschaft (DFG, German Scientific Research Association), which, as of 1937, was the new name of the Notgemeinschaft der Deutschen Wissenschaft (NG, Emergency Association of German Science). Support for research was decided by the heads of 13 special sections of the RFR (Fachspartenleiter).

Other members of the Council included:

- Kurt Diebner – Head of the RFR nuclear physics experimental site at Stadtilm in Thuringia and director of the Versuchsstelle (testing station) of the Heereswaffenamt (HWA, Army Ordnance Office) in Gottow.
- Abraham Esau – Head of the physics division from 1937 to the end of 1943. Plenipotentiary for nuclear physics from December 1942 to 1943, then plenipotentiary for high-frequency physics.
- Walther Gerlach – Replaced Abraham Esau as head of the physics division and plenipotentiary for nuclear physics on 1 January 1944.
- Werner Osenberg – Head of the planning board in the RFR 29 June 1943 to 1945. He also initiated the recall of approximately 5000 scientists and engineers from active military duty on the front so they could devote their talents to research and development. By the end of the war, the number recalled reached 15,000.
- Otto Scherzer – Head of radar finding (1944–1945).
- Erich Schumann – Plenipotentiary for the physics of explosives (1942–1945).
- Peter Adolf Thiessen – Head of the division of chemistry and organic materials.

== Reorganization ==
On 9 June 1942, Adolf Hitler issued a decree for the reorganization of the RFR as a separate legal entity under the Reich Ministry for Armament and Ammunition; the decree appointed Reich Marshall Göring as the president. The reorganization was done under the initiative of Reich Minister for Armament and Ammunition Albert Speer; it was necessary as the RFR under Minister Rust was ineffective and not achieving its purpose. It was the hope that Göring would manage the RFR with the same discipline and efficiency as he had in the aviation sector. A meeting was held on 6 July 1942 to discuss the function of the RFR and set its agenda. The meeting was a turning point in National Socialism's attitude towards science, as well as recognition that its policies which drove Jewish scientists out of Germany were a mistake, as the Reich needed their expertise. In 1933, Max Planck, as president of the Kaiser Wilhelm Gesellschaft, had met with Adolf Hitler. During the meeting, Planck told Hitler that forcing Jewish scientists to emigrate would mutilate Germany and the benefits of their work would go to foreign countries. Hitler went into a rant on the Jews and Planck could only remain silent and then take his leave.

== Bibliography ==
- Hentschel, Klaus, editor and Ann M. Hentschel, editorial assistant and Translator Physics and National Socialism: An Anthology of Primary Sources (Birkhäuser, 1996) ISBN 0-8176-5312-0
- Macrakis, Kristie Surviving the Swastika: Scientific Research in Nazi Germany (Oxford, 1993) ISBN 0-19-507010-0
