= Kaiser Wilhelm Society =

German scientific institution

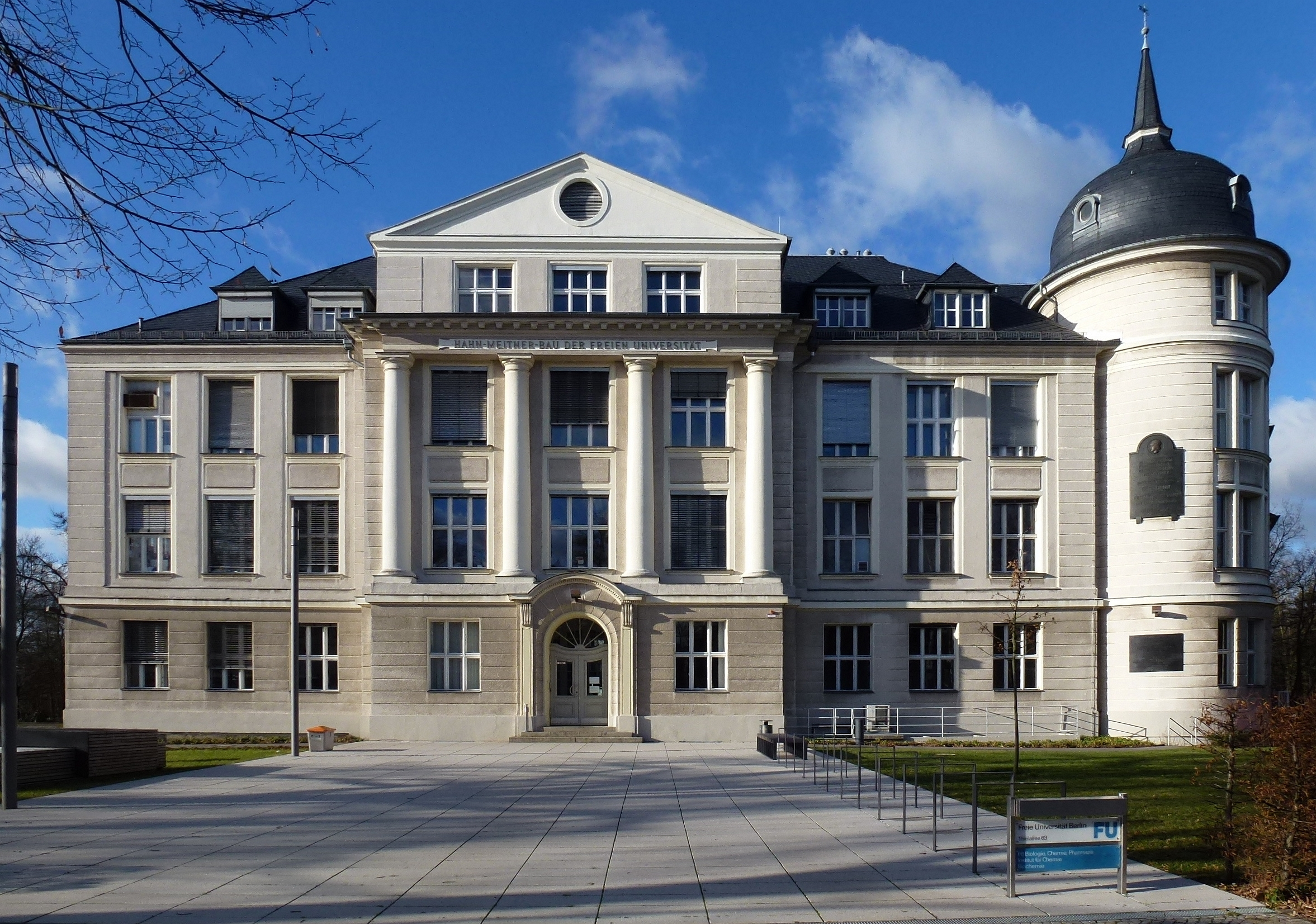
Former Kaiser-Wilhelm-Institut for Chemistry in Berlin, the place at which nuclear fission was first detected

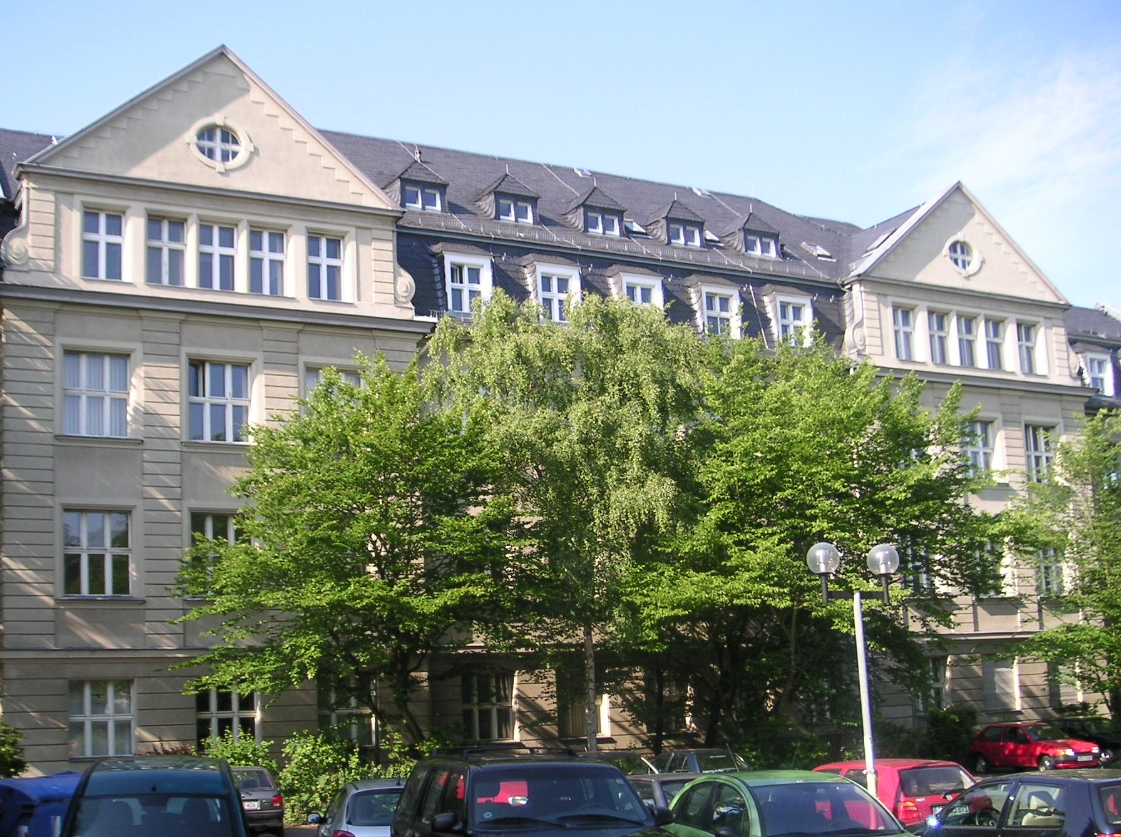
Former Kaiser-Wilhelm-Institut for Biology, Berlin

The Kaiser Wilhelm Society for the Advancement of Science (German: Kaiser-Wilhelm-Gesellschaft zur Förderung der Wissenschaften) was a German scientific institution established in the German Empire in 1911. Its functions were taken over by the Max Planck Society. The Kaiser Wilhelm Society was an umbrella organisation for many institutes, testing stations, and research units created under its authority.

== History ==
=== Constitution ===
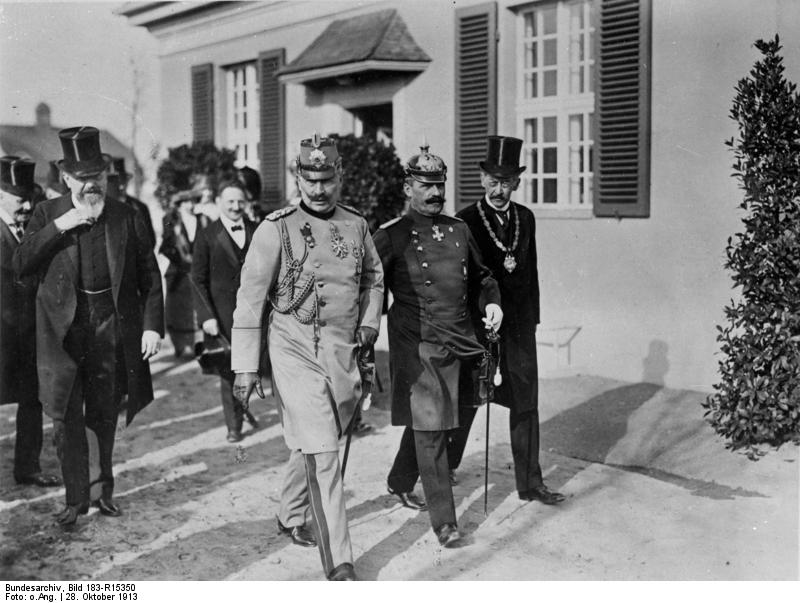
Opening of the Kaiser-Wilhelm-Institut in Berlin-Dahlem, 1913. From right: Adolf von Harnack, Friedrich von Ilberg, Kaiser Wilhelm II, Carl Neuberg, August von Trott zu Solz.

The Kaiser Wilhelm Gesellschaft (KWG) was founded in 1911 as a research institution outside the university system in order to advance the interests of German state and capital through the development of scientific knowledge relevant to industrial and military application. The inaugural meeting was held on 11 January 1911. The constituent institutes were established in succession and placed under the guidance of prominent directors, whose ranks included the physicists and chemists Walther Bothe, Peter Debye, Albert Einstein, Fritz Haber and Otto Hahn; a board of trustees also provided guidance.

Funding came from both business and government to reduce KWG's dependence on either source. It was also obtained from individuals, from the Notgemeinschaft der Deutschen Wissenschaft (Emergency Association of German Science), and foreign sources.

Outside Germany, the Rockefeller Foundation granted students worldwide one-year study stipends for whichever institute they chose. Some studied in Germany, in contrast to the German universities, with their formal independence from state administration, the institutions of the Kaiser Wilhelm Gesellschaft had no obligation to teach students.

The Kaiser Wilhelm Society and its research institutes were involved in weapons research, experimentation and production in both the First World War and the Second World War. During World War I, the group, and in particular Fritz Haber, was responsible for introducing the use of poison gas as a weapon. This was in direct violation of established international law.

=== Nazi era and World War II ===
The Kaiser Wilhelm Society sacked its Jewish employees following the enactment of the Nazi Law for the Restoration of the Professional Civil Service in the spring of 1933. Fritz Haber was the only institute director who resigned to protest the instructions issued by the general secretary of the KWG, Friedrich Glum. The Jewish directors were retained for several more years.

After the implementation of the Nuremberg Laws in the autumn of 1935, the KWG President Max Planck convinced the Rockefeller Foundation not to withdraw its funding for the construction of the Kaiser Wilhelm Institute for Physics (KWIP) in Berlin. He also successfully lobbied the Nazi government through his industrial connections to commit to financing KWIP's future operations.

On 29 May 1937, Max Planck handed over the KWG presidency to the IG Farben founder and chairman Carl Bosch, based on the Society's decision to strengthen its industry ties. He had announced this step in early 1936.

In October 1939, after the German invasion of Poland, the Heereswaffenamt (HWA) requisitioned the Kaiser Wilhelm Institute for Physics for military use and forced its Dutch director Peter Debye, who refused to change his citizenship, onto paid leave in the United States. Werner Heisenberg and Otto Hahn were appointed to oversee the economic and military application of research into nuclear fission under the new head, Kurt Diebner.

==== Involvement in the Nazi German nuclear programme ====
In early February 1942, the KWG President Albert Vögler accepted to take back the nuclear power research at KWIP from the HWA at a meeting with the HWA head Wilhelm von Leeb and the HWA physicist Erich Schumann, but following a series of lectures that advertised the field the Reich Minister of Science Bernhard Rust assigned it to his Reich Research Council instead. As a result, the KWG "had changed from being a dependent research subsidy for the army to being even more dependent under the auspices of the Reich Research Council". However, after the appointment of Heisenberg as director of KWIP over Bothe, the Minister of Armaments and War Production Albert Speer's support for Heisenberg improved the organisation's standing and allowed it to start building an underground facility for trials with the uranium machine. In mid-1942, Vögler, who was the chairman of Vereinigte Stahlwerke, a member of the Freundeskreis der Wirtschaft and the unofficial scientific advisor to Reichsmarshal Hermann Göring, persuaded Speer to transfer the Reich Research Council from Rust's ministry to Göring as the supreme commander of the Luftwaffe.

Walther Bothe, the director of the Physics Division at the Kaiser Wilhelm Institute for Medical Research (KWImF) in Heidelberg from 1933 to 1957, was a top member of Uranverein, which coordinated the German nuclear program during World War II. He tried to launch the first German cyclotron, for which he received support from Speer and the HWA, although the device had not yet been assigned any military use. The particle accelerator was completed by January 1944 and Speer visited the institute in May 1944 to monitor progress on the cyclotron. Bothe burnt classified reports on military research at the approach of the United States Army. Questioned by Samuel Goudsmit of the Alsos Mission, he revealed that the cyclotron had been expected to deliver radioactive material for nuclear weapons.

The Chinese physicist He Zehui, who joined Bothe's KWImF team in 1943, worked with Heinz Maier-Leibnitz on completing a cloud chamber and discovered the phenomenon of elastic electron–positron collision before the war's end. She was also able to photograph the Bhabha scattering while at Heidelberg.

==== The Holocaust ====
During World War II, some of the weapons and medical research performed by the KWI was connected to fatal human experimentation on living test subjects (prisoners) in Nazi concentration camps. In fact, members of the KWI of Anthropology, Human Heredity and Eugenics, particularly Otmar von Verschuer received preserved Jewish bodies and body parts such as eyes for study and display from Auschwitz. These were provided by his pupil Dr. Josef Mengele from prisoners in his charge. He specialized in examining twins, and their genetic relationship, especially for their eye colour and other personal qualities. As the American forces closed in on the relocated KWI, the organization's president, Albert Vögler, an industrialist and early Nazi Party backer, committed suicide, knowing he would be held accountable for the group's crimes and complicity in war crimes.

=== Post-war ===
By the end of the Second World War, the KWG and its institutes had lost their central location in Berlin and were operating in other locations. The KWG was operating out of its Aerodynamics Testing Station in Göttingen. Albert Vögler, the president of the KWG, committed suicide on 14 April 1945. Thereupon, Ernst Telschow assumed the duties until Max Planck could be brought from Magdeburg to Göttingen, which was in the British zone of the Allied Occupation Zones in Germany. Planck assumed the duties on 16 May until a president could be elected. Otto Hahn was selected by directors to be president, but there were a number of difficulties to be overcome. Hahn, being related to nuclear research had been captured by the allied forces of Operation Alsos, and he was still interned at Farm Hall in Britain, under Operation Epsilon. At first, Hahn was reluctant to accept the post, but others prevailed upon him to accept it. Hahn took over the presidency three months after being released and returned to Germany. However, the Office of Military Government, United States (OMGUS) passed a resolution to dissolve the KWG on 11 July 1946.

Meanwhile, members of the British occupation forces, specifically in the Research Branch of the OMGUS, saw the society in a more favourable light and tried to dissuade the Americans from taking such action. The physicist Howard Percy Robertson was director of the department for science in the British Zone; he had a National Research Council Fellowship in the 1920s to study at the Georg August University of Göttingen and LMU Munich. Also, Colonel Bertie Blount was on the staff of the British Research Branch, and he had received his doctorate at Göttingen under Walther Borsche. Among other things, Bertie suggested to Hahn to write to Sir Henry Hallett Dale, who had been the president of the Royal Society, which he did. While in Britain, Bertie also spoke with Dale, who came up with a suggestion. Dale believed that it was only the name which conjured up a pejorative picture and suggested that the society be renamed the Max Planck Gesellschaft. On 11 September 1946, the Max Planck Gesellschaft was founded in the British Zone only. The second founding took place on 26 February 1948 for both the American and British occupation zones. The physicists Max von Laue and Walther Gerlach were also instrumental in establishing the society across the allied zones, including the French zone.

Following the end of the war, a portion of the Kaiser Wilhelm Institute for Physics' archive relating to the Nazi German nuclear programme was removed to the Soviet Union. The documents were returned to the Max Planck Society in the 1990s with help from the historian Rainer Karlsch.

== Presidents ==
- Adolf von Harnack (1911–1930)
- Max Planck (1930–1937, 16 May 1945 – 31 March 1946)
- Carl Bosch (1937–1940)
- Albert Vögler (1941–1945)
- Otto Hahn (1 April 1946 – 10 September 1946 in the British Occupation Zone)

== Institutes, testing stations and units ==
=== Kaiser Wilhelm Institutes ===
- KWI for Animal Breeding Research, founded in Dummerstorf. Transformed into a research institute of the (East)-German Academy of Sciences.
- KWI of Anthropology, Human Heredity and Eugenics, founded 1926 in Berlin-Dahlem.
- KWI for Bast Fibre Research, founded 1938 in Sorau. It was moved to Mährisch Schönberg in 1941 and to Bielefeld in 1946. After its incorporation into the Max Planck Society in 1948 and two further relocations to Westheim and Niedermarsberg in 1951 it was incorporated into the Max Planck Institute for Breeding Research and moved to Köln-Vogelsang. The Institute was closed down in 1957. Its first director was Ernst Schilling 1938–1945 and 1948–1951.
- KWI for Biology, founded 1912 in Berlin and moved to Tübingen in 1943. It was then the Max Planck Institute for Biology until 2005.
- KWI for Biochemistry, founded 1912. Nowadays, there exists the Max Planck Institute of Biochemistry, but there is no straight relation between the institutes.
- KWI for Biophysics, formerly the Institut für Physikalische Grundlagen der Medizin of Friedrich Dessauer was incorporated into the KWG by Boris Rajewsky in 1937. The Institute is located in Frankfurt am Main. It is now the Max Planck Institute for Biophysics.
- KWI for Brain Research, founded 1914 in Berlin by Oskar Vogt. It is now the Max Planck Institute for Brain Research.
- KWI for Cell Physiology, founded 1930 in Dahlem, Berlin by Otto Heinrich Warburg and the Rockefeller Foundation.
- KWI for Chemistry, founded 1911 in Dahlem. It is now the Max Planck Institute for Chemistry, also known as the Otto Hahn Institute.
- KWI for Coal Research Institute of the KWG, founded 1912 in Mülheim. It is now the Max Planck Institute für Kohlenforschung.
- KWI for Comparative and International Private Law, founded 1926 in Berlin by Ernst Rabel. It is now the Max Planck Institute for Comparative and International Private Law in Hamburg.
- KWI for Comparative Public Law and International Law, founded 1924 in Berlin; the first director was Viktor Bruns. It is now the Max Planck Institute for Comparative Public Law and International Law in Heidelberg.
- KWI for Experimental Therapy, founded in 1915 by August von Wasserman.
- KWI for Fiber Chemistry, founded in 1920 by Reginald Oliver Herzog, closed in 1934.
- KWI of Flow (Fluid Dynamics) Research, founded 1925. Ludwig Prandtl was the director from 1926 to 1946. It is now the Max Planck Institute for Dynamics and Self-Organization.
- KWI for German History, founded 1917 in Berlin. It was later the Max Planck Institute for History, now transformed a Max Planck Institute for multi-ethnic societies.
- KWI for Hydrobiological Research. One of its directors was August Friedrich Thienemann.
- KWI for Iron Research, founded 1917 in Aachen and it moved to Düsseldorf in 1921. It is now the Max Planck Institute for Iron Research GmbH.
- KWI for Leather Research, founded 1921 in Dresden by Max Bergmann. It became a part of an institute that later became the Max Planck Institute of Biochemistry in Martinsried.
- KWI for Medical Research founded 1927 and opened 1930 in Heidelberg by Ludolf von Krehl. It is now the Max Planck Institute for Medical Research in Heidelberg.
- KWI for Metals Research, founded 1921 in Neubabelsberg. It closed in 1933 and reopened in Stuttgart in 1934. It is now the Max Planck Institute for Metals Research in Stuttgart.
- KWI for Plant Breeding Research, founded in Müncheberg in 1929 by Erwin Baur. It is now the Max Planck Institute for Plant Breeding Research located in Cologne.
- KWI for Physical Chemistry and Electrochemistry, founded 1911 in Dahlem, Berlin. It is now the Fritz Haber Institute of the MPG, named after Fritz Haber, who was the director 1911-1933.
- KWI for Physics, founded 1917 in Berlin. Albert Einstein was the director 1917-1933; in 1922, Max von Laue became deputy director and took over administrative duties from Einstein. It is now the Max Planck Institute for Physics; also known as the Werner Heisenberg Institute.
- KWI for Physiology of Effort (Work)/KWI for Occupational Physiology, founded 1912 in Berlin, moved to Dortmund in 1929. It is now the Max Planck Institute for Molecular Physiology in Dortmund.
- German Research Institute for Psychiatry (a Kaiser Wilhelm institute) in Munich. It is now the Max Planck Institute of Psychiatry.
- KWI for Silicate Research, founded 1926 in Berlin-Dahlem by Wilhelm Eitel.
- KWI for Textile Chemistry
- KWI Vine Breeding

=== Kaiser Wilhelm Society organisations ===
- Aerodynamic Testing Station (Göttingen e. V.) of the Kaiser Wilhelm Society. The testing unit Aerodynamische Versuchsanstalt (AVA) was formed in 1925 along with the KWI of Flow (Fluid Dynamics) Research. In 1937, it became the testing station of the KWG.
- Biological Station Lunz of the Kaiser Wilhelm Society
- German Entomological Institute of the Kaiser Wilhelm Society
- Hydrobiological Station of the Kaiser Wilhelm Society
- Institute for Agricultural Work Studies in the Kaiser Wilhelm Society
- Research Unit "D" in the Kaiser Wilhelm Society
- Rossitten Bird Station of the Kaiser Wilhelm Society, founded 1901 in Rossitten and integrated into the Kaiser Wilhelm Society in 1921. The ornithological station was ceased at the end of the Second World War, but work continues at the ornithological station Radolfzell which is part of the Max Planck Institute for Ornithology.
- Silesian Coal Research Institute of the Kaiser Wilhelm Society, in Breslau.

=== Institutions outside Germany ===
- Bibliotheca Hertziana, founded 1913 in Rome. It is now the Bibliotheca Hertziana - Max Planck Institute of Art History in Rome.
- German-Bulgarian Institute for Agricultural Science founded in 1940 in Sofia.
- German-Greek Institute for Biology in the Kaiser Wilhelm Society founded in 1940 in Athens.
- German-Italian Institute for Marine Biology at Rovigno, Italy.
- Kaiser Wilhelm Institute for Cultivated Plant Research founded in 1940 in Vienna, Austria.

=== Other ===
- Institute for the Science of Agricultural Work—founded in 1940 in Breslau.
- Institute for Theoretical Physics
- Research Unit for Virus Research of the Kaiser Wilhelm Institute for Biochemistry and the Kaiser Wilhelm Institute for Biology

== See also ==
- Research Materials: Max Planck Society Archive
