= Walther Gerlach =

German physicist (1889–1979)

- Born: 1 August 1889; Biebrich, Hessen-Nassau, German Empire
- Died: 10 August 1979 (aged 90); Munich, West Germany
- Education: University of Tübingen
- Known for: Stern–Gerlach experiment
- Scientific career
- Fields: Experimental Physics
- Workplaces: Goethe University Frankfurt; University of Tübingen
- Academic advisors: Friedrich Paschen
- Doctoral students: Gertrude Scharff Goldhaber; Heinz Billing

Walther Gerlach (1 August 1889 – 10 August 1979) was a German physicist who co-discovered, through laboratory experiment, spin quantization in a magnetic field, the Stern–Gerlach effect. The experiment was conceived by Otto Stern in 1921 and successfully conducted first by Gerlach in early 1922. He was Nazi Germany's plenipotentiary of nuclear physics from December 1943 until his capture by US Army in May 1945.

== Education ==
Gerlach was born in Biebrich, Hessen-Nassau, German Empire, as son of Dr. med. Valentin Gerlach and his wife Marie Niederhaeuser.

He studied at the University of Tübingen from 1908, and received his doctorate in 1912, under Friedrich Paschen. The subject of his dissertation was on the measurement of radiation. After obtaining his doctorate, he continued on as an assistant to Paschen, which he had been since 1911. Gerlach completed his Habilitation at Tübingen in 1916, while serving during World War I.

== Career ==
=== World War I and the interwar period ===
From 1915 to 1918, during the war, Gerlach did service with the German Army. He worked on wireless telegraphy at Jena under Max Wien. He also served in the Artillerie-Prüfungskommission under Rudolf Ladenburg.

Gerlach became a Privatdozent at the University of Tübingen in 1916. A year later, he became a Privatdozent at the University of Göttingen. From 1919 to 1920, he was the head of a physics laboratory of Farbenfabriken Elberfeld, later Bayer-Werke A.G.

In 1921, he became außerordentlicher (extraordinary) professor at Goethe University Frankfurt. It was before 17 February 1922 that Gerlach succeeded with the experiment on spin quantization in a magnetic field ("Richtungsquantelung"), which is commonly called the Stern–Gerlach experiment, having originally been proposed by Otto Stern and also making use of molecular beam methods developed by Stern. The experiment itself was carried out only by Gerlach, Stern by that time having left for a professorship in Rostock, in Frankfurt some time before 17 February 1922. On this day the "critical theorist" Wolfgang Pauli sent Gerlach a postcard with congratulations and the remark "Jetzt wird hoffentlich auch der ungläubige Stern von der Richtungsquantelung überzeugt sein" ("Hopefully the disbelieving Stern will now be convinced of the spin-theory"). The results were published jointly by Gerlach and Stern in 1922.

In 1925, Gerlach took a call and became an ordinarius professor at the University of Tübingen, successor to Friedrich Paschen. In 1929, he took a call and became ordinarius professor at the Ludwig-Maximilians-Universität München, successor to Wilhelm Wien. He held this position until May 1945, when he was arrested by the American and British Armed Forces.

From 1937 until 1945, Gerlach was a member of the supervisory board of the Kaiser-Wilhelm-Gesellschaft (KWG). After 1946, he continued to be an influential official in its successor organization after World War II, the Max-Planck-Gesellschaft (MPG).

=== During World War II ===
In November 1939, he joined the ArbeitsGemeinschaft Cornelius working group on ship degaussing and torpedo physics. Other than his military research for the Kriegsmarine, he worked closely with Hitler's nuclear research adviser Rudolf Mentzel and other Nazi science policy-makers.

On 2 December 1943, on Mentzel's initiative, Gerlach was appointed by the Reich Minister of Armaments and War Production Albert Speer as head of the physics section of the Reichsforschungsrat (RFR, Reich Research Council) ("the emperor of physics") and as the plenipotentiary of nuclear physics, replacing Abraham Esau. He established himself with his deputy Kurt Diebner in the Kaiser Wilhelm Institute for Physics in Berlin-Dahlem. Working within a budget of 3 million RM for 1944, he was due to send monthly progress reports on nuclear physics to Mentzel as his superior. In April 1944, he founded the Reichsberichte für Physik, which were official reports appearing as supplements to the Physikalische Zeitschrift. From April to September 1944, he negotiated with IG Farben a contract for the building of a heavy water production plant, and thwarted the company's attempt to patent the process. In June 1944, he took steps to concentrate personnel and funds on the nuclear power project, which remained a top priority, in accordance with Speer's decree.

He is known to have worked in the uranium research laboratory in the basement of the secondary school at Stadtilm, where Diebner's team evacuated from Berlin in the autumn of 1944 and began to prepare a low-temperature experiment in a uranium machine without the use of heavy water. This led to the supposed nuclear weapons testing carried out in March 1945 at the Jonas Valley near the Ohrdruf concentration camp.

As late as December 1944, he asserted to the Chief of the Party Chancellery Martin Bormann that nuclear power could influence the outcome of the war and that Germany had a "considerable advantage" over the rival United States programme. On 22 March 1945, following the Ohrdruf experiment, he was sent by the SS Reichsführer Heinrich Himmler to Bormann to personally report that the nuclear chain reaction had worked, but no immediate military breakthrough was forthcoming.

His progress reports were seized by Alsos Mission's Samuel Goudsmit in Stadtilm on 12 April 1945. One of these mentioned the necessity of acquiring tons of uranium (for the uranium machines), which led Goudsmit to the erroneous conclusion that the Germans failed to understand the mechanism for an atomic bomb. Gerlach himself was captured by the American troops in Bavaria by 12 May 1945.

From May 1945, he was interned in France and Belgium by British and American Armed Forces under Operation Alsos. From July 1945 to January 1946, he was detained in England at Farm Hall under Operation Epsilon, which interned 10 German scientists thought to have participated in the development of atomic weapons.

=== Post-war era ===
Upon Gerlach's return to Germany in 1946, he became a visiting professor at the University of Bonn. From 1948, he became an ordinarius professor of experimental physics and director of the physics department at the Ludwig-Maximilians-Universität München, a position he held until 1957. He was also rector of the university from 1948 to 1951.

From 1949 to 1951, Gerlach was the founding president of the Fraunhofer-Gesellschaft, which promotes applied sciences. From 1949 to 1961, he was the vice-president of the Deutsche Gemeinschaft zur Erhaltung und Förderung der Forschung (German Association for the Support and Advancement of Scientific Research); also known in short as the Deutsche Forschungs-Gemeinschaft (DFG), previously the Notgemeinschaft der Deutschen Wissenschaft.

In 1957, Gerlach was a co-signer of the Göttingen Manifesto, which was against rearming the Federal Republic of Germany with atomic weapons.

=== Other positions / Decorations / Honours ===
- From 1935 – Chairman of the committee to appoint a successor to Arnold Sommerfeld.
- From 1948 – a member of the Göttingen, Halle, and Munich Academies of Sciences.
- Civil Class of the order Pour le Mérite.
- 1970 – Bundesverdienstkreuz mit Stern Order of Merit of the Federal Republic of Germany

== Literature ==
- Walther Gerlach: Matter, Electricity, Energy: The Principles of Modern Atomistic and Experimental Results of Atomic Investigations (D. Van Nostrand, 1928)
- Mac Hartmann and Walther Gerlach: Naturwissenschaftliche Erkenntnis und ihre Methoden (Springer, 1937)
- Walther Gerlach: Die Quantentheorie. Max Planck sein Werk und seine Wirkung. Mit einer Bibliographie der Werke Max Plancks (Universität Bonn, 1948)
- Walther Gerlach: Probleme der Atomenergie (Biederstein Verlag, 1948)
- Walther Gerlach: Wesen und Bedeutung der Atomkraftwerke (Oldenbourg, 1955)
- Walther Gerlach and Martha List: Johannes Kepler. Leben und Werk (Piper Verlag, München 1966)
- Walther Gerlach (editor): Das Fischer Lexikon – Physik (Fischer Bücherei, 1969)
- Walther Gerlach: Physik des täglichen Lebens – Eine Anleitung zu physikalischem Denken und zum Verständnis der physikalischen Entwicklung (Fischer Bücherei, 1971) ISBN 3-436-01341-2
- Walther Gerlach (editor): Physik. Neuasugabe Unter Mitarbeit Von Prof. Dr. Josef Brandmüller (Fischer Taschenbuch Verlag, 1978) ISBN 3-596-40019-8
- Walther Gerlach and Dietrich Hahn: Otto Hahn – Ein Forscherleben unserer Zeit (Wissenschaftliche Verlagsgesellschaft, WVG, Stuttgart 1984) ISBN 3-8047-0757-2
- Walther Gerlach and Martha List: Johannes Kepler : Der Begründer der modernen Astronomie München, (Piper Verlag GmbH, 1987) ISBN 3-492-15248-1

== Bibliography ==
- Walther Gerlach and Otto Stern, Das magnetische Moment des Silberatoms, Zeitschrift für Physik Volume 9, Number 1, 353-355 (1922). The article was received on 1 April 1922.

== See also ==
- List of German inventors and discoverers
