= Klaus Hentschel =

German physicist and historian of science

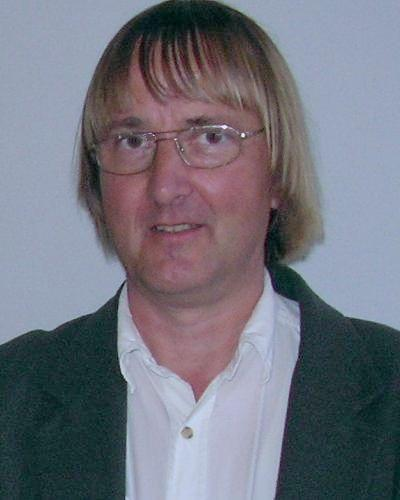
Klaus Hentschel, 2010 in Jena

Klaus Hentschel (born 4 April 1961) is a German physicist, historian of science and professor. He is full professor and the head of the University of Stuttgart's History of Science and Technology section of its History department.

== Life and work ==
Born in Bad Nauheim, Hentschel from 1979 to 1985 studied physics, philosophy, science, history and musicology at the University of Hamburg. He completed his studies in philosophy in 1985 with the master's examination, and a study in physics in 1987. After some studies in the United States, among others in Boston on a DAAD, he in 1989 received his PhD at the University of Hamburg. His thesis was entitled "Interpretationen und Fehlinterpretationen der speziellen und der allgemeinen Relativitätstheorie durch Zeitgenossen Albert Einsteins" (Interpretations and misinterpretations of the special and general relativity theory by Albert Einstein's contemporaries).

After graduation Hentschel participated in a research project by the Deutsche Forschungsgemeinschaft on epistemic modal logic. In 1991 he was appointed assistant professor at the Institute for the History of Science of the University of Göttingen. In 1995 he obtained his habilitation in Hamburg with the thesis, entitled "Zum Zusammenspiel von Instrument, Experiment und Theorie. Rotverschiebung im Sonnenspektrum und verwandte spektrale Verschiebungseffekte von 1880 bis 1960." (About the interaction of instruments, experiment and theory. The shift in the solar spectrum, and related spectral shift effects from 1880 to 1960).

In the year 1995/1996 Klaus Hentschel was Fellow at the Dibner Institute for the History of Science and Technology of Bern Dibner, and at the Massachusetts Institute of Technology (MIT). From 1996 to 2002 he was successively Assistant Professor at the Institute for the History of Science at the University of Göttingen, visiting scholar at MIT, and Visiting Professor at the Department of Philosophy at the University of Hamburg. From 2003 to 2005 he worked with a research grant from the Deutsche Forschungsgemeinschaft at the University of Bern and 2005/2006 at the University of Stuttgart in the Department of History of Science and Technology.

In 2006 Hentschel got a call for a Professorship at the University of Halle-Wittenberg for a period of five years in the field of comparative history of science which he declined. In the same year he was appointed Professor at the University of Stuttgart, where he chairs the Section for History of Science and Technology in the History Department since 2006.

== Prizes ==
- 1989: Kurt-Hartwig-Siemers Science-Prize of the University of Hamburg
- 1992: Heinz Maier-Leibnitz-Prize of the German Federal Ministry of Science & Education
- 1993: Paul-Bunge-Prize for the history of instrumentation, granted by the German Bunsen Society and the Society of German Chemists (GDCh)
- 1998: Marc-Auguste-Pictet-Prize of the Société de physique et d'histoire naturelle de Genève in Geneva
- 1999: Georg-Uschmann-Prize for History of Science of the Deutsche Akademie der Naturforscher Leopoldina
- 2017: Neu-Whitrow-Prize of the Commission on Bibliography and Documentation, International Union for the History and Philosophy of Science for his international Database of Scientific Illustrators 1450-1950 (DSI)

== Memberships in Academies ==
- 2004: Member of the German National Academy of Sciences Leopoldina
- 2005: Corresponding member of the Académie Internationale d'Histoire des Sciences in Paris, Rom und Liège
- 2013: Full member (membre effectif) of the Académie Internationale d'Histoire des Sciences
- 2015: Chairman of the Ruth Schmidt Stockhausen Stiftung for Visual Arts, Music and Poetry.

== Selected publications ==
- Hentschel, Klaus. Interpretationen und Fehlinterpretationen der speziellen und der allgemeinen Relativitätstheorie durch Zeitgenossen Albert Einsteins. (1990).
- Hentschel, Klaus. Der Einstein-Turm. Erwin F. Freundlich und die Relativitätstheorie. Ansätze zu einer ‚dichten Beschreibung‘ von institutionellen, biographischen und theoriengeschichtlichen Aspekten. Spektrum, Heidelberg 1992, ISBN 3-86025-025-6 (Abstract in German). English edition: The Einstein tower, translated from the German by Ann M. Hentschel. Stanford University Press, Stanford, Californien 1997, ISBN 0-8047-2824-0.
- Hentschel, Klaus, ed. Physics and national socialism: An anthology of primary sources. Basel (Birkhäuser/Springer), 1996/2011 (= Science Networks, 18).
- Hentschel, Klaus. Zum Zusammenspiel von Instrument, Experiment und Theorie. Hamburg (Kovac), 1998 (studies the interplay of scientific instrumentation, experimentation and theory development in the areas of redshift, spectroscopy and metrology).
- Hentschel, Klaus. The Mental Aftermath: On the Mentality of German Physicists 1945-1949. Oxford (Oxford Univ. Press), 2007.
- Hentschel, Klaus. Mapping the Spectrum-Techniques of Visual Representation in Research and Teaching. Oxford (Oxford Univ. Press), 2002.
- Hentschel, Klaus. Visual Cultures of Science and Technology - A Comparative History. Oxford (Oxford Univ. Press), 2014.
- Dan Greenberger, Klaus Hentschel and Friedel Weinert (eds.): Compendium of Quantum Physics. Concepts, Experiments, History and Philosophy. Dordrecht, Heidelberg, New York (Springer) 2009.
- Hentschel, Klaus. Photons. The History and Mental Models of Light Quanta. Cham (Springer) 2018.

Articles (a selection among more than 200):

- Hentschel, Klaus. "Die Korrespondenz Einstein-Schlick: Zum Verhältnis der Physik zur Philosophie." Annals of Science 43.5 (1986): 475-488.
- Hentschel, Klaus. Einstein's attitude towards experiments: Testing relativity theory 1907-1927, Studies in History and Philosophy of Science 23 [1992], pp. 593-624.
- Hentschel, Klaus. "Erwin Finlay Freundlich and testing Einstein's theory of relativity." Archive for history of exact sciences 47.2 (1994): 143-201.
- Hentschel, Klaus. Das Brechungsgesetz in der Fassung von Snellius. Rekonstruktion seines Entdeckungspfades und eine Übersetzung seines lateinischen Manuskriptes sowie ergänzender Dokumente, Archive for History of Exact Sciences 55 [2001], pp. 297-344.
- Hentschel, Klaus. What history of science can learn from Michael Frayn's Copenhagen, Interdisciplinary Science Reviews 27 [2002], pp. 211-216.
- Hentschel, Klaus. Gauß, Meyerstein and Hanoverian metrology, Annals of Science 64,1 [2007], 41-72.
- Hentschel, Klaus. From Materials Research to Materials Science – disciplinary and institutional developments (with a special focus on Germany and the United States), in Robert Crease (ed.) Between Science and Industry - Institutions in the History of Materials Science, Singapore: World Scientific 2024, pp. 13-65.
- Hentschel, Klaus. Ten Focal Areas for the History of Scientific Instrumentation in the 21st Century. The Perspective of a Historian of Science, Nuncius. Journal of the Material and Visual History of Science 41,2 (2026), pp. 461-474.
