= Waffenamt =

Former German weapons agency

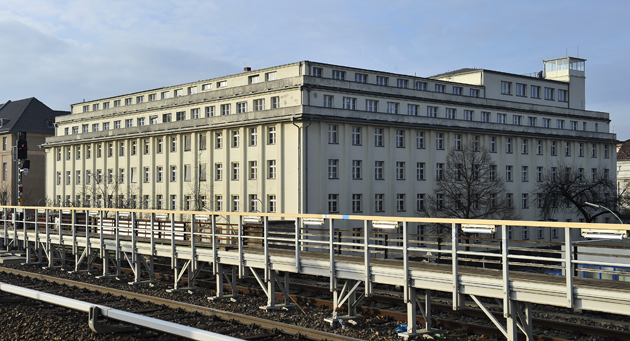
Former Heereswaffenamt, Jebensstraße corner Hertz Avenue, Berlin

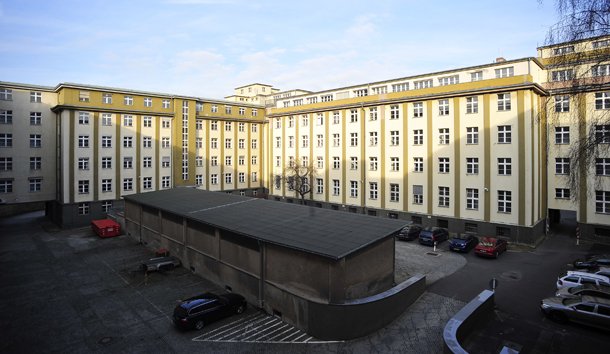
Former Army Ordnance Department (courtyard), Jebensstraße corner Hertz Avenue

Waffenamt (WaA) was the German Army Weapons Agency. It was the centre for research and development of the Weimar Republic and later the Third Reich for weapons, ammunition and equipment to the Army branch of the Reichswehr and then Wehrmacht. The office was responsible not only for weapons development and procurement but also for technical specifications, manufacturing documentation, standardization of army equipment, and acceptance of weapons, ammunition and materiel.

It was founded 8 November 1919 as Reichswaffenamt (RWA), and 5 May 1922 the name was changed to Heereswaffenamt (HWA).

The task of overseeing Germany's gigantic pre-World War II rearmament program was given to the Heeresabnahmestelle (the Army Acceptance Organization, commonly referred to as the Abnahme), a subsidiary of the Heereswaffenamt.

By 1940 the Abnahme consisted of 25,000 personnel in five departments in 16 inspection areas, augmented by specially selected plant personnel who were assigned to assist the Waffenamt inspectors in each manufacturing facility. Later, in the middle of 1944, approximately 8,000 of these Abnahme inspectors were "freed for service at the front".

The Heeres-Abnahmewesen was responsible for the testing and acceptance of all weapons, equipment and ammunition before delivery to the Wehrmacht. Inspections were carried out according to detailed guidelines called "Technische Lieferbedingungen" (TLs) prepared by the various Waffenprüfämter (WaPrüf) departments

When the rearmament program began, Waffenamt inspection departments were established in each factory and armourers were encouraged to apply for positions there. In preparation for their new duties they were given a four-week course at the Heereswaffenmeisterschule (Army Armourers School). The course ended with a test for Technical Inspector which raised the rank of each successful applicant to that of Oberleutnant (First Lieutenant). At the beginning of 1935, all inspection officials in the newly created program started on an equal footing as Technical Inspectors, but by the start of the war in 1939 nearly all of them had been promoted to Technical Inspector First Class with a rank of Hauptmann (Captain).

Waffenamt code (WaA) is the German inspection proof mark and can be found on firearms and equipment.

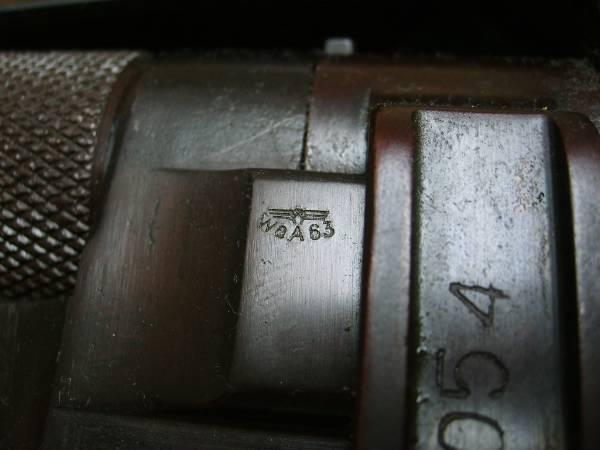
An example of a Waffenamt stamp.

== Chiefs of the Waffenamt ==
| No. | Portrait | Name | Took office | Left office | Time in office |
|---|---|---|---|---|---|
| 1 | Ludwig Wurtzbacher [de] | Generalleutnant; Ludwig Wurtzbacher (1870–1926) | 1 June 1920 | 1 March 1925 | 4 years, 273 days |
| 2 | Erich von Botzheim [de] | Generalmajor; Erich von Botzheim (1871–1961) | 1 March 1925 | 28 February 1926 | 364 days |
| 3 | Max Ludwig | Generalleutnant; Max Ludwig (1871–1961) | 1 March 1926 | 30 May 1929 | 3 years, 90 days |
| 4 | Alfred von Vollard-Bockelberg [de] | Generalleutnant; Alfred von Vollard-Bockelberg (1874–1945) | 1 June 1929 | 30 November 1933 | 4 years, 182 days |
| 5 | Kurt Liese [de] | Generalleutnant; Kurt Liese (1882–1945) | 1 December 1933 | 28 February 1938 | 4 years, 89 days |
| 6 | Karl Heinrich Emil Becker | General der Artillerie; Karl Heinrich Emil Becker (1879–1940) | 1 March 1938 | 8 April 1940 † | 2 years, 38 days |
| 7 | Emil Leeb | General der Artillerie; Emil Leeb (1881–1969) | 16 April 1940 | 1 February 1945 | 4 years, 291 days |
| 8 | Walther Buhle | General der Infanterie; Walther Buhle (1894–1959) | 1 February 1945 | 8 May 1945 | 96 days |
