= Hanno Hahn =

German art historian and architectural researcher (1922–1960)

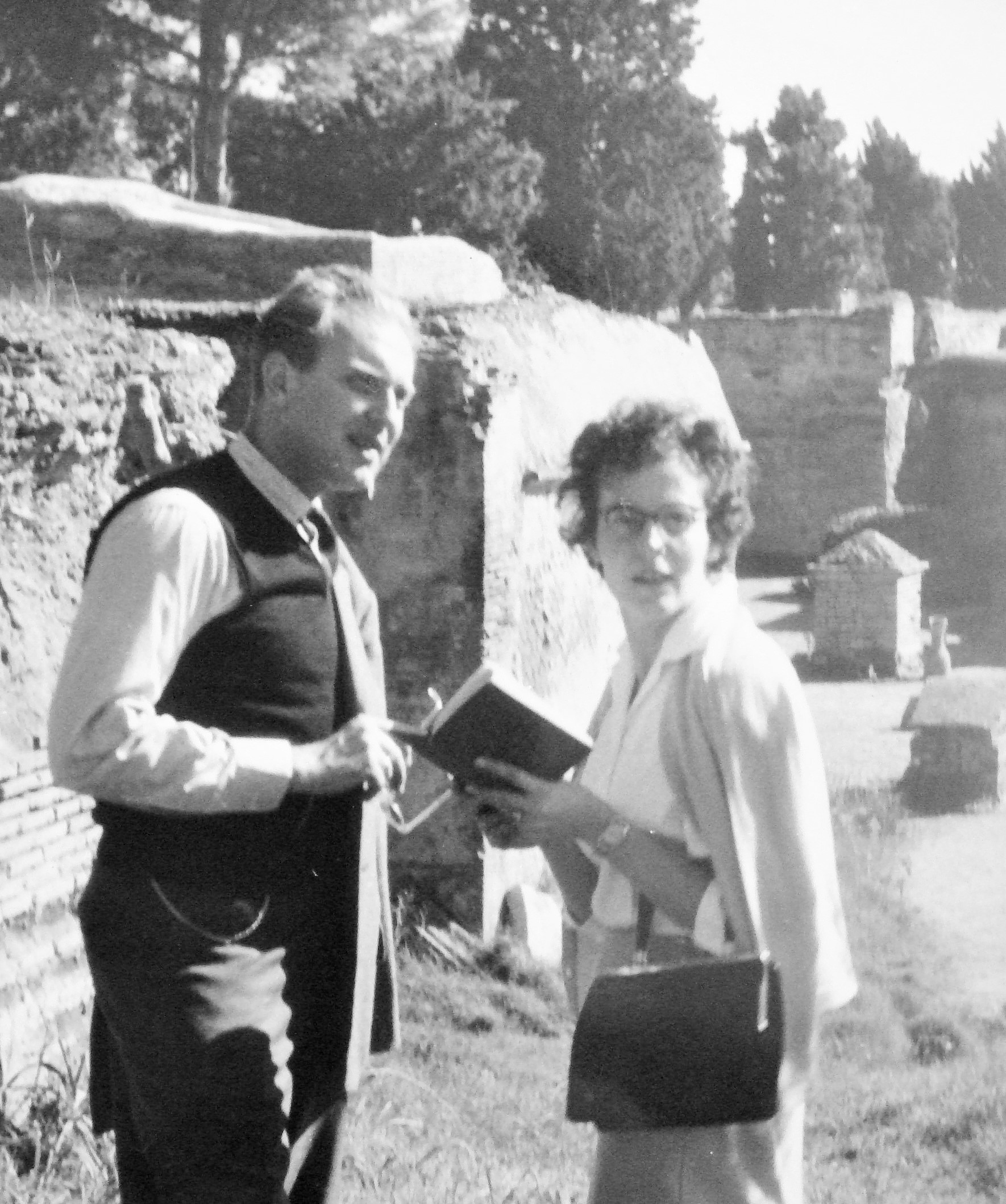
Hanno and Ilse Hahn in Ostia Antica, April 1960

Hanno Hahn (born April 9, 1922 in Berlin-Dahlem, died August 29, 1960 in Mars-la-Tour) was a German art historian and architectural researcher and the son of Otto Hahn and Edith Junghans.

Hahn enlisted in the army in 1942, and served on the Eastern Front in World War II as a panzer commander. He lost an arm in combat. After the war he became an art historian and architectural researcher (at the Hertziana in Rome), known for his discoveries in the early Cistercian architecture of the 12th century.

In August 1960, while on a study trip in France, Hahn died in a car accident, together with his wife and assistant Ilse Hahn née Pletz. They left a fourteen-year-old son, Dietrich Hahn. In 1990, the Hanno and Ilse Hahn Prize for outstanding contributions to Italian art history was established in memory of Hahno and Ilse Hahn to support young and talented art historians. It is awarded biennially by the Bibliotheca Hertziana – Max Planck Institute for Art History in Rome.
