= Applied Radiochemistry =

1936 lecture collection by Otto Hahn

- Editor: H. Milford
- Author: Otto Hahn
- Language: English
- Subject: Chemistry
- Publisher: Cornell University Press
- Publication date: 1936
- Publication place: United States, United Kingdom
- Pages: 278

Applied Radiochemistry is an important collection of lectures by German chemist Otto Hahn published in English in 1936 by the Cornell University Press (Ithaca, New York) and simultaneously by the Oxford University Press (London). Edited by H. Milford, and spanning 278 pages, the volume presents the content of a group of lectures delivered by Hahn between March and June 1933, when he was a lecturer of chemistry at Cornell University.

The work was cited by fellow Nobel laureate Glenn Seaborg as a major influence on his own early work in radiochemistry. The articles were delivered at the Kaiser Wilhelm Institute for Chemistry in Berlin.
