= Geiger (surname) =

Geiger is a German, Hungarian or French surname.

In the German language Geiger means "violin player."

People with this surname include:

- Abraham Geiger (1810–1874), German Reform Judaism rabbi
- Alain Geiger (born 1960), Swiss international football manager and former player
- Anna Bella Geiger (born 1933), Brazilian artist
- Anna Margarethe Geiger (1783–1809), German painter in pastel
- Arno Geiger (born 1968), Austrian writer
- August Geiger (architect) (1888–1968), American architect
- August Geiger (pilot) (1920–1943), German Luftwaffe night fighter ace
- Constanze Geiger (1835–1890), Austrian pianist, actor, theatrical actress, composer and singer
- Dennis Geiger (footballer, born 1984), German footballer
- Dennis Geiger (footballer, born 1998), German footballer
- Emily Geiger (1765–1825), American messenger in the American Revolutionary War
- Franz Geiger (1921–2011), German screenwriter
- Friedrich Geiger (1907–1996), German automobile designer, particularly for Mercedes-Benz
- Gary Geiger (1937–1996), American Major League Baseball player
- George Geiger (c. 1843–1904), US Army sergeant awarded the Medal of Honor for his actions in the Battle of Little Bighorn
- H. Jack Geiger (1925–2020), American physician and civil rights activist
- Hans Geiger (1882–1945), German physicist, co-inventor of the detector component of the Geiger counter, son of Wilhelm Geiger and brother of Rudolf Geiger
- Harold Geiger (1884–1927), American pioneer in Army aviation and ballooning
- Harriel G. Geiger (c. 1840–1886), African-American politician, blacksmith and lawyer
- Hermann Geiger (1914–1966), Swiss pilot
- Hugo Geiger (1901–1984), German politician
- Jacob Casson Geiger (1885–1981), American public health physician
- Johann Nepomuk Geiger (1805–1880), Viennese court painter
- John Geiger (disambiguation)
- Joseph Solomon Gieger ben Medigo Mi-Candia (1591–1655): Greek rabbi, author, physician
- Karl Geiger (born 1993), German ski jumper
- Kaylon Geiger (born 1997), American football player
- Lazarus Geiger (1829–1870), German philologist and philosopher
- Ludwig Geiger (1848–1919), German literary historian
- Margarethe Geiger (1783–1809), German artist
- Mark Geiger (born 1974), American soccer/football referee
- Matt Geiger (born 1969), American basketball player
- Michael Geiger (footballer) (born 1960), German football manager and former player
- Michael Geiger (American football) (born 1994), American former college football player
- Nick Geiger (born 1952), Australian rugby league footballer
- Nikolaus Geiger (1849–1897), German sculptor and painter
- Peter Geiger (1942–2025), Liechtenstein political historian
- Peter Johann Nepomuk Geiger (1805–1880), Viennese artist
- Philipp Lorenz Geiger (1785–1836), German pharmacist and chemist
- Reinold Geiger (born 1947), Austrian businessman
- Richard Geiger (1870–1945), Austrian painter
- Roger Geiger (born 1943), American scholar of higher education in the United States
- Rolf Geiger (1934–2023), German footballer
- Roy Geiger (1885–1947), United States Marine Corps general
- Rudolf Geiger (1894–1981), German meteorologist and climatologist, son of Wilhelm Geiger and brother of Hans Geiger
- Rupprecht Geiger (1908–2009), German abstract painter and sculptor
- Stefan Geiger, German conductor and trombonist
- Teddy Geiger (born 1988), American singer and guitarist
- Theodor Geiger (1891–1952), German socialist and sociologist
- Vinzenz Geiger (born 1997), German Nordic combined skier and 2022 Olympic champion
- Wilhelm Geiger (1856–1943), German Orientalist and father of Hans Geiger
- Willi Geiger (judge) (1909–1994), German judge: president of the Federal Court of Justice of Germany
1. and Associate Justice in the Federal Constitutional Court of Germany
- Willi Geiger (painter) (1878–1971), German painter

== See also ==
- Geiger's
- Giger. surnames
- Guyger. surnames
