= Geiger =

Geiger may refer to:

== People ==
- Geiger (surname)
- Geiger, standard author abbreviation of Philipp Lorenz Geiger (1785–1836), German pharmacist and chemist

== Places ==
- Geiger, Alabama, United States, a town
- Geiger, South Sudan, a border town filled with refugees
- Geiger Key, Florida, United States, an island in the Florida Keys
- Geiger (crater), a lunar impact crater on the far side of the Moon
- Camp Geiger, a United States Marine Corps base
- Camp Geiger (Boy Scouts of America), a Boy Scouts camp in Missouri, United States
- Geiger Field, a World War II training base near Spokane, Washington, United States

== Businesses ==
- Geiger (corporation), a promotional products company
- Geiger Engineering, a German aircraft engine manufacturer
- Geiger Engineers, an American structural engineering consulting firm
- Hotel Geiger, a traditional hotel complex located in Bischofswiesen, Upper Bavaria, Germany

== Other uses ==
- Geiger counter, a device for detecting radiation
- Geiger tree (Cordia sebestena), a species of flowering plant
- Geiger, an Image Comics series by Geoff Johns
- Geiger (Marvel Comics), a minor, teenage, Marvel Comics superheroine
- USNS Geiger, a United States Navy transport ship

== See also ==
- Giger, a surname
- Guyger, a surname
