= Gregor Bloéb =

Austrian actor

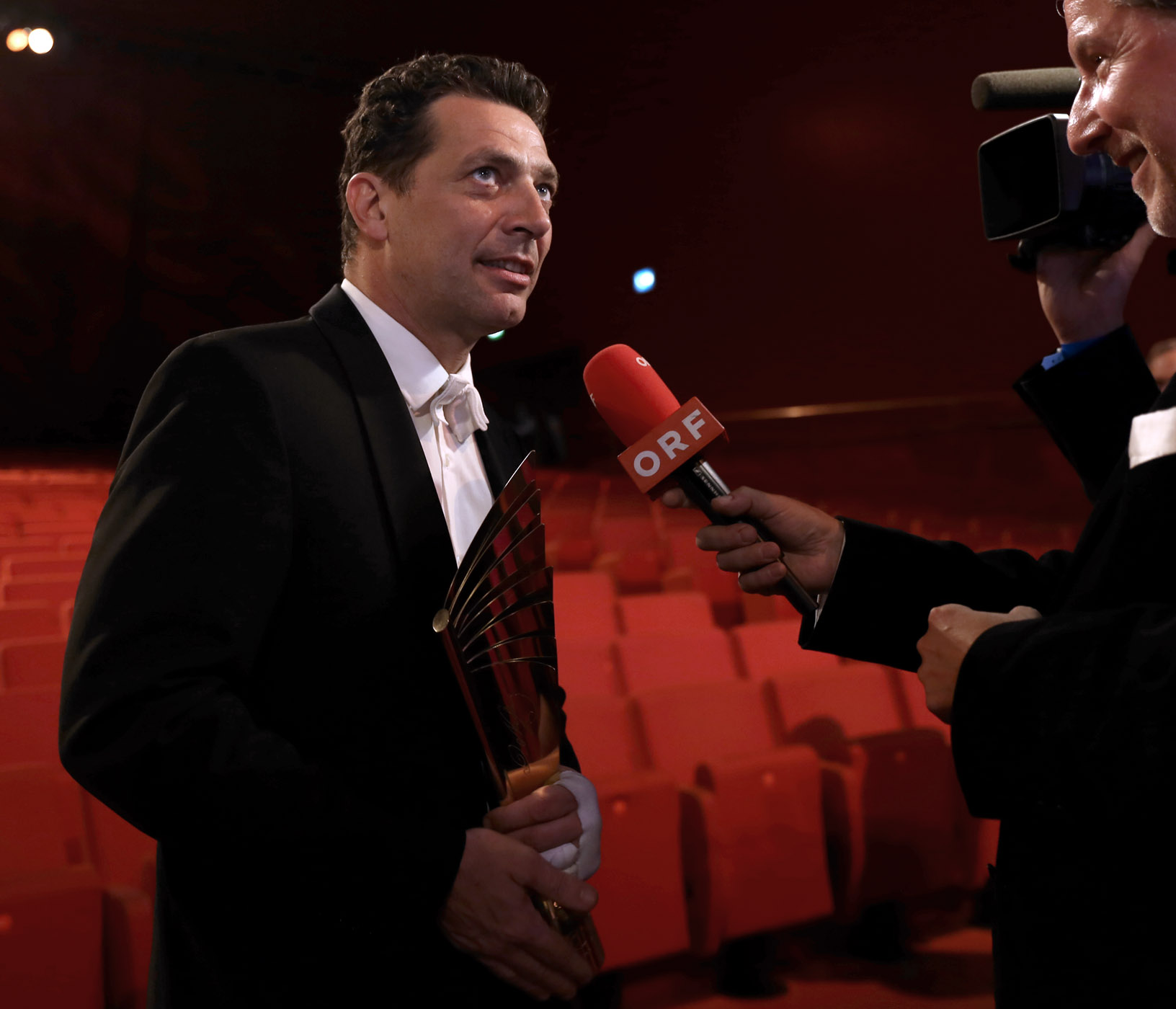
- Bloéb holding the Nestroy Theatre Prize in 2013
- Born: 3 January 1968 (age 58); Innsbruck, Austria
- Occupation: Actor
- Years active: 1990–present

Gregor Bloéb (born 3 January 1968 in Innsbruck, Austria) is an Austrian theater, film, and television actor.

== Life ==
=== Career ===
Bloéb first gained fame in 1990 by impersonating the mayor's and hotelier's son "Stefan Wechselberger" in Felix Mitterer's Piefke Saga, in which his brother Tobias Moretti also starred.

After six years of directing the Theatersommer Haag, Adi Hirschal handed over this position to Gregor Bloéb at the end of 2008, who played "Phileas Fogg" in Around the World in Eighty Days. Bloéb played the leading role in the play Cyrano de Bergerac in the first year of the artistic directorship.

Apart from acting, Bloéb also devotes himself to music. His band Gregor Bloéb und seine Tantiemen is now known far beyond the borders of Tyrol with its program consisting of music and comedy.

From March 2006 Gregor Bloéb took part in the 2nd season of the ORF show Dancing Stars alongside his dance partner Michaela Heintzinger as a celebrity dancer. He had to leave the show after the 5th round, on April 7.

In the film Keinohrhasen (2007) he plays a couple with his wife Nina Proll, in a guest role.

In 2010, he played Bushido's tour manager Marek Lieberberg in the Bushido biopic Zeiten ändern dich.

In 2013 he played Franz Jägerstätter in the eponymous drama Jägerstätter by Felix Mitterer, the premiere was on June 20, 2013, at the Theater in der Josefstadt. In the same year, he played Sigismund in the remake of Ralph Benatzky's Singspiel The White Horse Inn. It was based on the old Berlin comedy The White Horse Inn by Oskar Blumenthal and Gustav Kadelburg. Bloéb thus follows in the footsteps of the 1952 film adaptations by Ulrich Beiger and Gunther Philipp, which still flickered across the screen with the legendary Hugo Lindinger – he played the mayor. At Stiegl's Bockbierfest in the city of Salzburg, the first clips of the reimaging with Bloéb could be seen.

Since 2019, he has appeared in the roles of the "Guten Gesell" and the Devil at the Salzburg Festival, directed by Michael Sturminger in Jedermann.

=== Private ===
Bloéb has two children with his former partner, actress Ute Heidorn, including actress Josephine Bloéb. He lives in Berlin and Pfaffenhofen. Bloéb and Nina Proll's son was born in 2008, shortly before that they had married, and their second son was born in 2010. Bloéb's brothers are Christoph Bloéb and actor Tobias Moretti.

== Filmography (selection) ==
- Die Piefke-Saga (1990–1993, TV miniseries)
- Der Autobahnkrieg (1991, report)
- Happy Holiday (1992, TV series, 13 episodes)
- Die Kommissarin (1994, TV series)
- Joint Venture (1994)
- Klinik unter Palmen (1996, TV series, 3 episodes)
- Dr. Stefan Frank – Der Arzt, dem die Frauen vertrauen – Ein Herz hört auf zu schlagen (1996)
- Single Bells (1997)
- Unser Charly (1997, season 2 episode 1: "Charly auf Abwegen")
- Tierarzt Dr. Engel (1998, TV series, 3 episodes)
- Fever (1998)
- Medicopter 117 – Jedes Leben zählt (1998, TV series)
- Der letzte Zeuge (1998, TV series)
- Tatort – Absolute Diskretion (1999, TV series)
- Tatort – Kriegsspuren (1999)
- Hart im Nehmen (2000)
- O Palmenbaum (2000)
- Liebestod (2000)
- Der Bulle von Tölz: Schöne, heile Welt (2000)
- Polizeiruf 110 – Gelobtes Land (2001, TV series)
- Tatort – Elvis lebt! (2002)
- Vollgas (2002)
- Andreas Hofer (2002)
- Die achte Todsünde: Toskana-Karussell (2002)
- Polizeiruf 110 – Um Kopf und Kragen (2002)
- Polizeiruf 110 – Tiefe Wunden (2003)
- Hero of the Gladiators (2003)
- Shark Attack in the Mediterranean (2004)
- Polizeiruf 110 – Vater Unser (2004)
- Tatort – Der Wächter der Quelle (2004)
- Polizeiruf 110 – Die Maß ist voll (2004)
- 4 Frauen und ein Todesfall (2005, TV series, 1 episode)
- Der Bulle von Tölz: Der Zuchtbulle (2005)
- Polizeiruf 110 – Mit anderen Augen (2006)
- Alles außer Sex (2005–2007, TV series, 20 episodes)
- Arme Millionäre (2005, TV series, 4 episodes)
- Die Landärztin (2005–2010, TV series, 8 episodes)
- Lapislazuli: In the Eyes of the Bear (2006)
- Muttis Liebling (2006)
- Reclaim Your Brain (2007)
- Rabbit Without Ears (2007)
- 1½ Knights: In Search of the Ravishing Princess Herzelinde (2008)
- Ein starkes Team – Geschlechterkrieg (2009, TV series)
- Zeiten ändern dich (2010)
- Undercover Love (2010, TV movie)
- Powder Girl (2011)
- Mord in bester Gesellschaft – Der Fluch der bösen Tat (2011)
- The White Horse Inn (2013)
- Tatort – Weihnachtsgeld (2014)
- Half Brothers (2015)
- Schweinskopf al dente (2016)
- Landkrimi – Sommernachtsmord (2016)
- König Laurin (2016)
- Anna Fucking Molnar (2017)
- eureBrauerei (2016, speaker)
- Die Toten vom Bodensee – Die vierte Frau (2018)
- Billy Kuckuck – Margot muss bleiben! (2018)
- Der Auftrag (2019)
- Tatort – Maleficius (2019)
- Billy Kuckuck – Eine gute Mutter (2019)
- Vier zauberhafte Schwestern (2020)
- Billy Kuckuck – Aber bitte mit Sahne! (2020)

== Awards ==
- Nestroy Theater Prize in the category "Best Actor" as Franz Jägerstätter in Jägerstätter at the Theater in der Josefstadt and at the Theatersommer Haag (2013)
- Medal of Honor of the Province of Tyrol (2018)
