= Joseph Solomon Delmedigo =

Greek rabbi

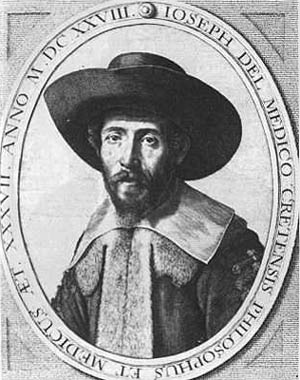
From the frontispiece to his "Sefer Elim."

Joseph Solomon Delmedigo (or Del Medigo), also known as Yashar Mi-Qandia (Hebrew: יש"ר מקנדיא; 16 June 1591 – 16 October 1655), was a rabbi, author, physician, mathematician, and music theorist.

Born in Candia, Crete, a descendant of Elia del Medigo, Joseph Solomon or Yashar Mi-Qandia is a member of Del Medigo de'Candia lineage from the Geiger family of Germany that settled first in Crete and then in Italy. Eventually, he moved to Padua, Italy, studying medicine and taking classes with Galileo Galilei in astronomy. After graduating in 1613 he moved to Venice and spent a year in the company of Leon de Modena and Simone Luzzatto. From Venice he went back to Candia and from there started traveling in the near East, reaching Alexandria and Cairo. There he went into a public contest in mathematics against a local mathematician. From Egypt he moved to Istanbul, there he observed the comet of 1619. After Istanbul he wandered along the Karaite communities in Eastern Europe, finally arriving at Amsterdam in 1623. He died in Prague, just before turning 65 after a celebration of lights at the Staronová synagoga. Yet in his lifetime wherever he sojourned he earned his living as a physician and or teacher. His only known works are Elim (Palms), dealing with mathematics, astronomy, the natural sciences, and metaphysics, as well as some letters and essays.

As Delmedigo writes in his book, he followed the lectures by Galileo Galilei, during the academic year 1609–1610, and was accorded the rare privilege of using Galileo's own telescope. In the following years he often refers to Galilei as "rabbi Galileo," an ambiguous phrase which may simply mean "my master, Galileo." (Delmedigo never calls him "our teacher and master, Rabbi Galileo," which would be the typical way of referring to an actual rabbi.) Elijah Montalto, physician of Maria de Medici, is also mentioned as one of his teachers.

== Works ==
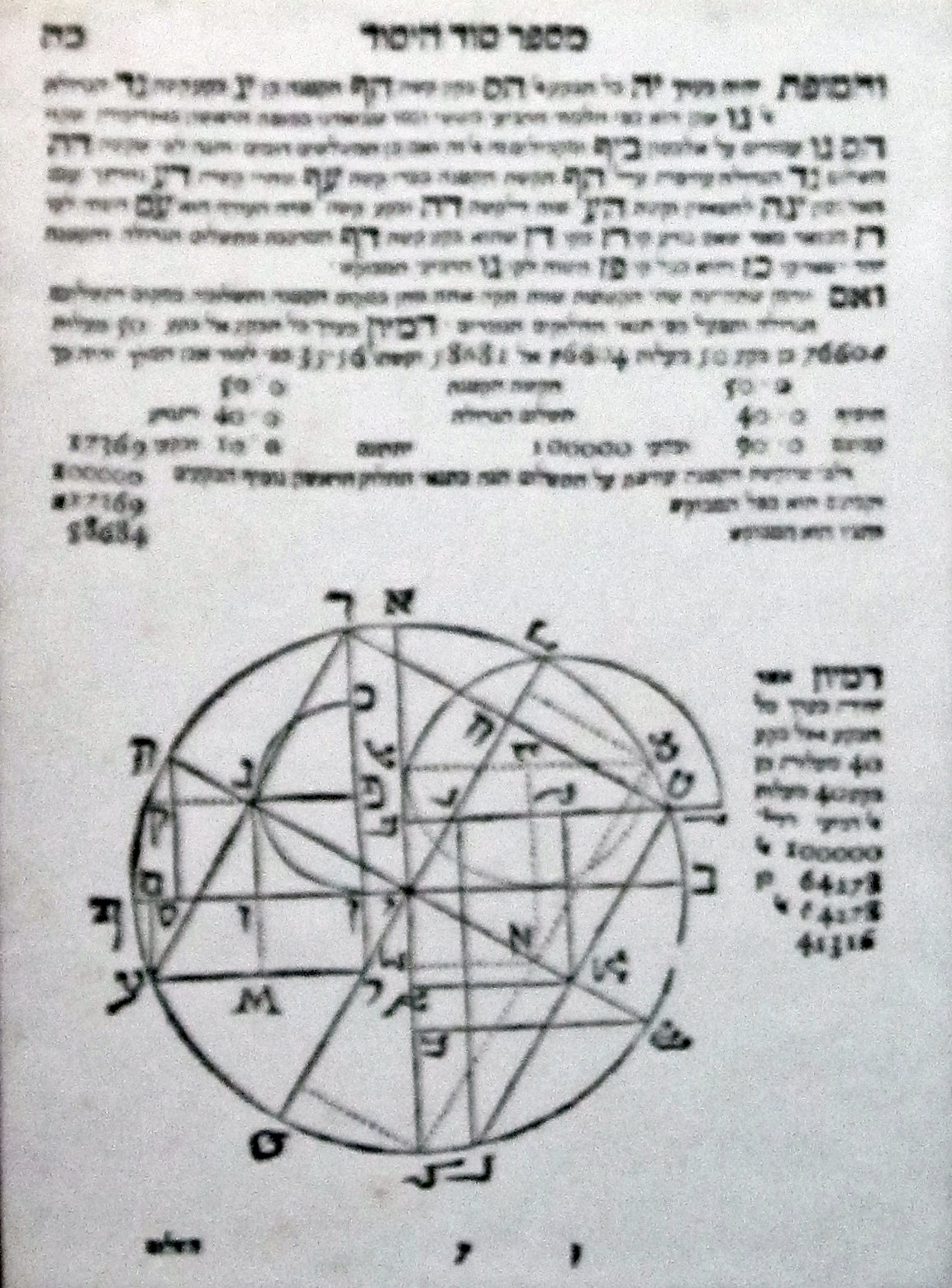
Sefer Elim

Elim (1629, published by Menasseh ben Israel, Amsterdam) is written in Hebrew, in response to 12 general and 70 specific religious and scientific questions sent to Delmedigo by a Karaite Jew, Zerach ben Natan from Troki (Lithuania). The format of the book is taken from the number of fountains and palm trees at Elim in the Sinai Peninsula, as given in Numbers, xxxiii, 9: since there are 12 fountains and 70 palm trees at Elim, Delmedigo divided his book into twelve major problems and seventy minor problems. The book, however, was heavily censored, so only four of the original twelve major problems appeared in the published work. The subjects discussed include astronomy, physics, mathematics, medicine, and music theory. In the area of music, Delmedigo discusses the physics of music including string resonance, intervals and their proportions, consonance and dissonance. Delmedigo argued that the Jews did not take part in the Scientific Revolution because of Ashkenazi exclusive intellectual interest in the Talmud, whereas the Sepharadim and the Karaites were more interested in natural philosophy and philosophy in general. He called the Jews to reclaim their prominence in philosophy and to incorporate into the non-Jewish surrounding via the exploration of natural sciences.

Some parts of the book were as follows:

- Ma'ayan Chatum (Closed or Sealed Fountain - Heb. מעין חתום) is the second part of Sefer Elim, containing the 70 questions and answers.
- Ma'ayan Ganim (Fountain of the Gardens - Heb. מעין גנים) is a continuation of Sefer Elim, consisting of the following short treatises: on trigonometry, on the first two books of the Almagest, on astronomy, on astronomical instruments, on Kabbalah (mainly the Ari) and the supernatural, on astrology, on algebra, on chemistry, on the aphorisms of Hippocrates, on the opinion of the ancients concerning the substance of the heavens, on the astronomy of the ancients, who considered the motion of the higher spheres due to spirits (Delmedigo shows that their motion is similar to that of the earth), on the principles of religion, and mathematical paradoxes.
- Chukkot Shamayim is a part of Mayan Ganim dealing with the first two books of the Almagest.
- Gevurot Hashem is a treatise on astronomy.

He also wrote a defense of the Kabbalah called Matzreif LaChachma (Heb. מצרף לחכמה) against the attack upon it by his great grandfather Eliyahu Delmedigo. In the preface of the book the publisher writes that the author himself admitted once that when he was young (18 years old when he went to study in the university of Padua) he used to mock the Kabbalah and fiercely opposed those who studied it, but when he turned twenty seven he had a change of heart when he met two great philosophers, R' Yaakov ibn Nachmias and R' Shlomo Aravi, who were also firm adherents of the Kabbalah and they showed him how closely it resembles the philosophy of Plato, since then there was a renewed spirit within him.

== Descendants ==
Some of Delmedigo's descendants from the Geiger family of Germany settled in Central Italy by the surname Del-Medigo da'Candia, others were recorded in Belorussia taken on the surname Gorodinsky (after the town of Gorodin). A member of this family, Mordechai Gorodinsky (later hebraized to Nachmani) was one of the founders of the Israeli city of Rehovot reported by the Yad Vashem.

== See also ==
- Baruch Spinoza
