= Del Medigo =

Del Medigo is the surname of a Cretan Jewish family that included several notables:

- Elia del Medigo (1458–1493), philosopher and Talmudist
- Joseph Solomon Delmedigo (1591–1655), scientist and philosopher
