= Michael Geiger =

Michael Geiger may refer to:

- Michael Geiger (American football) (born 1994), American football placekicker
- Michael Geiger (footballer) (born 1960), German footballer and coach
