= John Geiger =

John Geiger may refer to:

- John Geiger (rower) (1873–1956), American rower
- John Geiger (author), American-born Canadian author
- John H. Geiger (1926–2011), American architect and engineer
