= Batakrishna Ghosh =

Indian linguist (1905–1950)

Batakrishna Ghosh (1905–1950) was an Indian linguist, who specialised in Indo-European linguistics. He was born in 1905 and died at the age of 45 in 1950. He wrote a number of books and articles on Sanskrit and Indo-European linguistics. He translated Wilhelm Geiger's German book on the Pali language into English, published by the University of Calcutta.

His first major contribution in the field of Sanskrit was his book Les formations nominales et verbales en p du Sanskrit (1933), published by Adrien-Maisonneuve (Paris).

== Works ==
- Āpastamba and Gautama. 1927.
- Goethe and His Faust. 1932.
- Collection of the fragments of lost Brāhmanas. Panini, 1935.
- Indo-European Origin of Sanskrit. (edition). 1935.
- Vedica. Calcutta Oriental Press.
- Nominal and verbal formations in -p- in Sanskrit, tr. by Dilip Kumar Biswas. Sanskrit Pustak Bhandar, 1982.
- Pāli Literature and Language by Geiger, Wilhelm (trans. by Batakrishna Ghosh) . New Delhi: Munshiram Manoharlal Publishers. (1943, 2004).ISBN 81-215-0716-2.
- A Survey of Indo-European languages. Sanskrit Pustak Bhandar, 1979.
- A Law of Visarga-sandhi in Rksaṃhitā.
- Bijñānabāda, Sanskrit Pustak Bhandar, 1988
- Hindu Ideal of Life: According to Grhyasutras, Srauta-sŭtras, Dharmaśăstras, Arthasastra and Kamasŭtra. Sanskrit Pustak Bhandar, 1995.
- Linguistic Introduction To Sanskrit. (reprint) Cosmo Publications, 2006. ISBN 8177557637.
