= Weiden (electoral district) =

Federal electoral district of Germany

234 Weiden
- Electoral district for the Bundestag
- Weiden in 2025
- State: Bavaria
- Population: 209,200 (2019)
- Electorate: 165,807 (2021)
- Major settlements: Weiden in der Oberpfalz; Tirschenreuth; Vohenstrauß
- Area: 2,582.5 km^{2}

Current electoral district
- Created: 1949
- Party: CSU
- Member: Albert Rupprecht
- Elected: 2005, 2009, 2013, 2017, 2021, 2025

Weiden is an electoral constituency (German: Wahlkreis) represented in the Bundestag. It elects one member via first-past-the-post voting. Under the current constituency numbering system, it is designated as constituency 234. It is located in northeastern Bavaria, comprising the city of Weiden in der Oberpfalz and the districts of Neustadt an der Waldnaab and Tirschenreuth.

Weiden was created for the inaugural 1949 federal election. Since 2005, it has been represented by Albert Rupprecht of the Christian Social Union (CSU).

== Geography ==
Weiden is located in northeastern Bavaria. As of the 2021 federal election, it comprises the independent city of Weiden in der Oberpfalz and the districts of Neustadt an der Waldnaab and Tirschenreuth.

== History ==
Weiden was created in 1949, then known as Tirschenreuth. It acquired its current name in the 1976 election. In the 1949 election, it was Bavaria constituency 23 in the numbering system. In the 1953 through 1961 elections, it was number 218. In the 1965 through 1998 elections, it was number 221. In the 2002 and 2005 elections, it was number 236. In the 2009 through 2021 elections, it was number 235. From the 2025 election, it has been number 234.

Originally, the constituency comprised the independent city of Weiden in der Oberpfalz and the districts of Tirschenreuth, Neustadt an der Waldnaab, and Kemnath. In the 1965 through 1972 elections, also contained the district of Eschenbach. It acquired its current borders in the 1976 election.

Election	No.	Name	Borders
1949	23	Tirschenreuth	Weiden in der Oberpfalz city; Tirschenreuth district; Neustadt an der Waldnaab district; Kemnath district
1953	218	Tirschenreuth	Weiden in der Oberpfalz city; Tirschenreuth district; Neustadt an der Waldnaab district; Kemnath district
1957	218	Tirschenreuth	Weiden in der Oberpfalz city; Tirschenreuth district; Neustadt an der Waldnaab district; Kemnath district
1961	218	Tirschenreuth	Weiden in der Oberpfalz city; Tirschenreuth district; Neustadt an der Waldnaab district; Kemnath district
1965	221	Tirschenreuth	Weiden in der Oberpfalz city; Tirschenreuth district; Neustadt an der Waldnaab district; Kemnath district; Eschenbach district
1969	221	Tirschenreuth	Weiden in der Oberpfalz city; Tirschenreuth district; Neustadt an der Waldnaab district; Kemnath district; Eschenbach district
1972	221	Tirschenreuth	Weiden in der Oberpfalz city; Tirschenreuth district; Neustadt an der Waldnaab district; Kemnath district; Eschenbach district
1976	221	Weiden	Weiden in der Oberpfalz city; Neustadt an der Waldnaab district; Tirschenreuth district
1980	221	Weiden	Weiden in der Oberpfalz city; Neustadt an der Waldnaab district; Tirschenreuth district
1983	221	Weiden	Weiden in der Oberpfalz city; Neustadt an der Waldnaab district; Tirschenreuth district
1987	221	Weiden	Weiden in der Oberpfalz city; Neustadt an der Waldnaab district; Tirschenreuth district
1990	221	Weiden	Weiden in der Oberpfalz city; Neustadt an der Waldnaab district; Tirschenreuth district
1994	221	Weiden	Weiden in der Oberpfalz city; Neustadt an der Waldnaab district; Tirschenreuth district
1998	221	Weiden	Weiden in der Oberpfalz city; Neustadt an der Waldnaab district; Tirschenreuth district
2002	236	Weiden	Weiden in der Oberpfalz city; Neustadt an der Waldnaab district; Tirschenreuth district
2005	236	Weiden	Weiden in der Oberpfalz city; Neustadt an der Waldnaab district; Tirschenreuth district
2009	235	Weiden	Weiden in der Oberpfalz city; Neustadt an der Waldnaab district; Tirschenreuth district
2013	235	Weiden	Weiden in der Oberpfalz city; Neustadt an der Waldnaab district; Tirschenreuth district
2017	235	Weiden	Weiden in der Oberpfalz city; Neustadt an der Waldnaab district; Tirschenreuth district
2021	235	Weiden	Weiden in der Oberpfalz city; Neustadt an der Waldnaab district; Tirschenreuth district
2025	234	Weiden	Weiden in der Oberpfalz city; Neustadt an der Waldnaab district; Tirschenreuth district

== Members ==
The constituency has been held continuously by the Christian Social Union (CSU) since its creation. It was first represented by Hans Bodensteiner from 1949 to 1953. He was elected for the CSU, but defected to co-found the All-German People's Party (GVP) in November 1952. followed by Hugo Geiger from 1953 to 1961. Franz Weigl served from 1961 to 1972. Max Kunz was then representative from 1972 to 1990. Simon Wittmann served two terms from 1990 to 1998, followed by Georg Girisch from 1998 to 2005. Albert Rupprecht was elected in 2005, and re-elected in 2009, 2013, 2017, 2021, and 2025.

Election	Member	Party	%
1949	Hans Bodensteiner (Note: Bodensteiner was elected for the CSU, but joined the All-German People's Party (GVP) in November 1952.)	CSU	35.7
1949	Hans Bodensteiner	GVP	35.7
1953	Hugo Geiger	CSU	54.7
1957	Hugo Geiger	CSU	62.8
1961	Franz Weigl	CSU	61.1
1965	Franz Weigl	CSU	60.2
1969	Franz Weigl	CSU	57.2
1972	Max Kunz	CSU	56.1
1976	Max Kunz	CSU	62.1
1980	Max Kunz	CSU	60.0
1983	Max Kunz	CSU	63.3
1987	Max Kunz	CSU	57.8
1990	Simon Wittmann	CSU	55.8
1994	Simon Wittmann	CSU	53.2
1998	Georg Girisch	CSU	47.1
2002	Georg Girisch	CSU	59.2
2005	Albert Rupprecht	CSU	48.4
2009	Albert Rupprecht	CSU	44.9
2013	Albert Rupprecht	CSU	55.1
2017	Albert Rupprecht	CSU	46.3
2021	Albert Rupprecht	CSU	38.5
2025	Albert Rupprecht	CSU	43.5

== Election results ==
=== 2025 election ===
Federal election (2025): Weiden
Notes:	Blue background denotes the winner of the electorate vote. Pink background denotes a candidate elected from their party list. Yellow background denotes an electorate win by a list member, or other incumbent. A ✓ or ✗ denotes status of any incumbent, win or lose respectively.						
Party	Candidate	Votes	%	±%	Party votes	%	±%
CSU	✓ Albert Rupprecht	59,268	43.5	▲5.1	55,094	40.4	▲5.0
AfD	Manfred Schiller	31,351	23.0	▲12.7	33,124	24.3	▲12.9
SPD	Gregor Johannes Forster	16,294	12.0	▼10.5	15,931	11.7	▼10.7
FW	Hubert Josef Schicker	9,673	7.1	Steady	8,215	6.0	▼3.2
Greens	Anneliese Droste	6,624	4.9	▼0.2	7,926	5.8	▼1.2
Left	Julia Anna Neumann	5,590	4.1	▲2.3	5,367	3.9	▲1.8
FDP	Dr. Theodor Alexander Klotz	4,126	3.0	▼1.8	4,169	3.1	▼4.3
Independent	Konrad Willibald Dippel	2,431	1.8				
BSW					3,514	2.6	
Tierschutzpartei					896	0.7	▼0.3
dieBasis					449	0.3	▼0.9
ÖDP	Sebastian Josua Sparrer	787	0.6	▼0.1	418	0.3	▼0.2
Volt					417	0.3	▲0.2
die PARTEI					347	0.3	▼0.2
BP					306	0.2	▼0.3
BD					107	0.1	
Humanists					61	0.0	
MLPD					21	0.0	
Informal votes		653			435		
Total valid votes		136,144			136,362		
Turnout		136,797	84.1	▲4.3			
CSU hold	Majority	27,917	20.5	▲4.5			

=== 2021 election ===
Federal election (2021): Weiden
Notes:	Blue background denotes the winner of the electorate vote. Pink background denotes a candidate elected from their party list. Yellow background denotes an electorate win by a list member, or other incumbent. A ✓ or ✗ denotes status of any incumbent, win or lose respectively.						
Party	Candidate	Votes	%	±%	Party votes	%	±%
CSU	✓ Albert Rupprecht	50,575	38.5	▼7.8	46,451	35.4	▼7.7
SPD	Uli Grötsch	29,573	22.5	▲0.2	29,461	22.4	▲3.4
AfD	Manfred Schiller	13,523	10.3		14,898	11.3	▼2.1
Independent	Konrad Dippel	9,358	7.1				
FW	Tobias Groß	9,306	7.1	▲1.4	12,067	9.2	▲5.3
Greens	Anneliese Droste	6,633	5.0	▲1.5	9,170	7.0	▲2.0
FDP	Silke Klotz	6,303	4.8	▲0.7	9,601	7.3	▲0.8
Left	Christian Weidner	2,315	1.8	▼2.7	2,830	2.2	▼2.6
dieBasis	Dietmar Assel	1,458	1.1		1,574	1.2	
Tierschutzpartei					1,249	1.0	▲0.2
ÖDP	Christian Wallmeyer	860	0.7	▼0.6	612	0.5	▼0.3
BP	Roland Bayer	771	0.6	▼1.8	719	0.5	▼0.5
Independent	Helmut Bauer	749	0.6				
Unabhängige					696	0.5	
PARTEI					651	0.5	0.0
Pirates					345	0.3	0.0
Team Todenhöfer					192	0.1	
Gesundheitsforschung					151	0.1	0.0
Volt					148	0.1	
NPD					128	0.1	▼0.3
V-Partei3					94	0.1	▼0.1
Humanists					87	0.1	
Bündnis C					70	0.1	
du.					65	0.0	
The III. Path					64	0.0	
LKR					14	0.0	
DKP					13	0.0	0.0
MLPD					6	0.0	0.0
Informal votes		823			891		
Total valid votes		131,424			131,356		
Turnout		132,247	79.8	▲2.3			
CSU hold	Majority	21,002	16.0	▼8.0			

=== 2017 election ===
Federal election (2017): Weiden
Notes:	Blue background denotes the winner of the electorate vote. Pink background denotes a candidate elected from their party list. Yellow background denotes an electorate win by a list member, or other incumbent. A ✓ or ✗ denotes status of any incumbent, win or lose respectively.						
Party	Candidate	Votes	%	±%	Party votes	%	±%
CSU	✓ Albert Rupprecht	59,285	46.2	▼8.9	55,691	43.1	▼9.7
SPD	Uli Grötsch	28,614	22.3	▲0.3	24,631	19.0	▼3.5
AfD					17,411	13.5	▲9.9
Independent	Konrad Dippel	11,906	9.3				
FW	Karl Meier	7,295	5.7	▲2.2	5,061	3.9	▲0.3
Left	Christian Weidner	5,677	4.4	▲1.8	6,204	4.8	▲1.4
FDP	Martin Hofmann	5,269	4.1	▲2.6	8,479	6.6	▲3.2
Greens	Gisela Helgath	4,553	3.6	▼0.3	6,426	5.0	▲0.7
BP	Petra Ringelmann	3,103	2.4		1,293	1.0	▲0.1
Tierschutzpartei					966	0.7	▲0.1
ÖDP	Karlheinz Binner	1,613	1.3	0.0	960	0.7	▼0.2
Independent	Karl Schmid	876	0.7				
PARTEI					580	0.4	
NPD					494	0.4	▼1.2
Pirates					352	0.3	▼1.2
Gesundheitsforschung					196	0.2	
V-Partei³					192	0.1	
DM					143	0.1	
BGE					113	0.1	
DiB					97	0.1	
MLPD					22	0.0	0.0
DKP					17	0.0	
BüSo					14	0.0	0.0
Informal votes		2,323			1,172		
Total valid votes		128,191			129,342		
Turnout		130,514	77.5	▲7.7			
CSU hold	Majority	30,671	23.9	▼9.3			

=== 2013 election ===
Federal election (2013): Weiden
Notes:	Blue background denotes the winner of the electorate vote. Pink background denotes a candidate elected from their party list. Yellow background denotes an electorate win by a list member, or other incumbent. A ✓ or ✗ denotes status of any incumbent, win or lose respectively.						
Party	Candidate	Votes	%	±%	Party votes	%	±%
CSU	✓ Albert Rupprecht	64,930	55.1	▲10.2	62,126	52.8	▲8.4
SPD	Uli Grötsch	25,881	22.0	▲2.1	26,484	22.5	▲2.4
Independent	Konrad Willibald Dippel	5,181	4.4				
Greens	Johann Mayer	4,531	3.8	▼1.1	5,072	4.3	▼2.3
FW	Karl Meier	4,165	3.5		4,259	3.6	
Left	Klaus Schmitsdorf	3,117	2.6	▼2.7	3,982	3.4	▼4.1
AfD	Hans-Peter Schaller	2,855	2.4		4,243	3.6	
NPD	Patrick Hermann Schröder	1,895	1.6	▼0.8	1,909	1.6	▼0.9
Pirates	Floyd Ralf Kretschmar	1,806	1.5		1,758	1.5	▼0.3
FDP	Heinz-Dieter Pauly	1,735	1.5	▼5.6	3,953	3.4	▼8.4
ÖDP	Karlheinz Helmut Binner	1,489	1.3	0.0	1,098	0.9	▼0.4
BP					1,071	0.9	0.0
Tierschutzpartei					772	0.7	▼0.1
REP					289	0.2	▼0.3
DIE FRAUEN					254	0.2	
Independent	Karl-Justus Human	204	0.2				
Party of Reason					162	0.1	
PRO					109	0.1	
DIE VIOLETTEN					105	0.1	▼0.1
RRP					27	0.0	▼0.5
BüSo					19	0.0	▼0.1
MLPD					18	0.0	0.0
Informal votes		1,114			1,193		
Total valid votes		117,789			117,710		
Turnout		118,903	69.8	▼2.3			
CSU hold	Majority	39,049	33.1	▲8.1			

=== 2009 election ===
Federal election (2009): Weiden
Notes:	Blue background denotes the winner of the electorate vote. Pink background denotes a candidate elected from their party list. Yellow background denotes an electorate win by a list member, or other incumbent. A ✓ or ✗ denotes status of any incumbent, win or lose respectively.						
Party	Candidate	Votes	%	±%	Party votes	%	±%
CSU	✓ Albert Rupprecht	54,891	44.9	▼3.5	54,009	44.4	▼6.3
SPD	Werner Schieder	24,261	19.9	▼7.7	24,467	20.1	▼10.0
Independent	Konrad Dippel	17,196	14.1				
FDP	Norbert Ziegler	8,664	7.1	▲4.3	14,272	11.7	▲5.3
Left	Sandro Hammer	6,567	5.4	▲2.7	9,093	7.5	▲3.9
Greens	Johann Mayer	6,031	4.9	▲2.6	8,060	6.6	▲2.7
NPD	Karsten Panzer	2,994	2.5	▼0.7	3,071	2.5	▲0.5
Pirates					2,207	1.8	
ÖDP	Rita Wiesend	1,563	1.3		1,565	1.3	
FAMILIE					1,132	0.9	▲0.2
BP					1,054	0.9	0.0
Tierschutzpartei					872	0.7	
REP					693	0.6	▼0.2
RRP					642	0.5	
CM					222	0.2	
DIE VIOLETTEN					176	0.1	
PBC					108	0.1	▼0.1
DVU					59	0.0	
BüSo					33	0.0	0.0
MLPD					21	0.0	0.0
Informal votes		1,859			2,270		
Total valid votes		122,167			121,756		
Turnout		124,026	72.1	▼5.8			
CSU hold	Majority	30,630	25.0	▲4.2			

=== 2005 election ===
Federal election (2005):Weiden
Notes:	Blue background denotes the winner of the electorate vote. Pink background denotes a candidate elected from their party list. Yellow background denotes an electorate win by a list member, or other incumbent. A ✓ or ✗ denotes status of any incumbent, win or lose respectively.						
Party	Candidate	Votes	%	±%	Party votes	%	±%
CSU	Albert Rupprecht	64,110	48.4	▼10.8	67,015	50.7	▼10.6
SPD	Ludwig Stiegler	36,454	27.5	▼7.9	39,773	30.1	▲0.3
Independent	Konrad Dippel	17,944	13.6				
FDP	Werner Ott	3,735	2.8	▲0.9	8,458	6.4	▲3.4
Left	Luise Nomayo	3,477	2.6		4,764	3.6	▲3.2
Alliance 90/The Green	Stefan Kick	3,142	2.4	▼0.1	5,149	3.9	▲0.3
NPD	Gerhard Klenhart	2,271	1.7		2,722	2.1	▲1.8
BP	Fritz Witt	1,263	1.0	0.0	1,162	0.9	▲0.7
Familie					1,029	0.8	
REP					1,003	0.8	▲0.3
Feminist					425	0.3	▲0.2
GRAUEN					330	0.2	▲0.2
PBC					192	0.1	▲0.1
BüSo					83	0.1	▲0.1
MLPD					55	0.0	
Informal votes		2,240			2,476		
Total valid votes		132,396			132,160		
Turnout		134,636	77.9	▼4.8			
CSU hold	Majority	27,656	20.9				
