= Mia, Love of My Life =

1998 Italian-German TV mini series

Mia, Love of My Life (German: Mia, Liebe meines Lebens, Italian: Mia per sempre) is a 1997 Italian-German TV mini series starring Claudia Cardinale, Lise Hearns, and Tobias Moretti. It is set in an Irish fishing village.
