= Albert Rupprecht =

German politician

Albert Rupprecht MdB
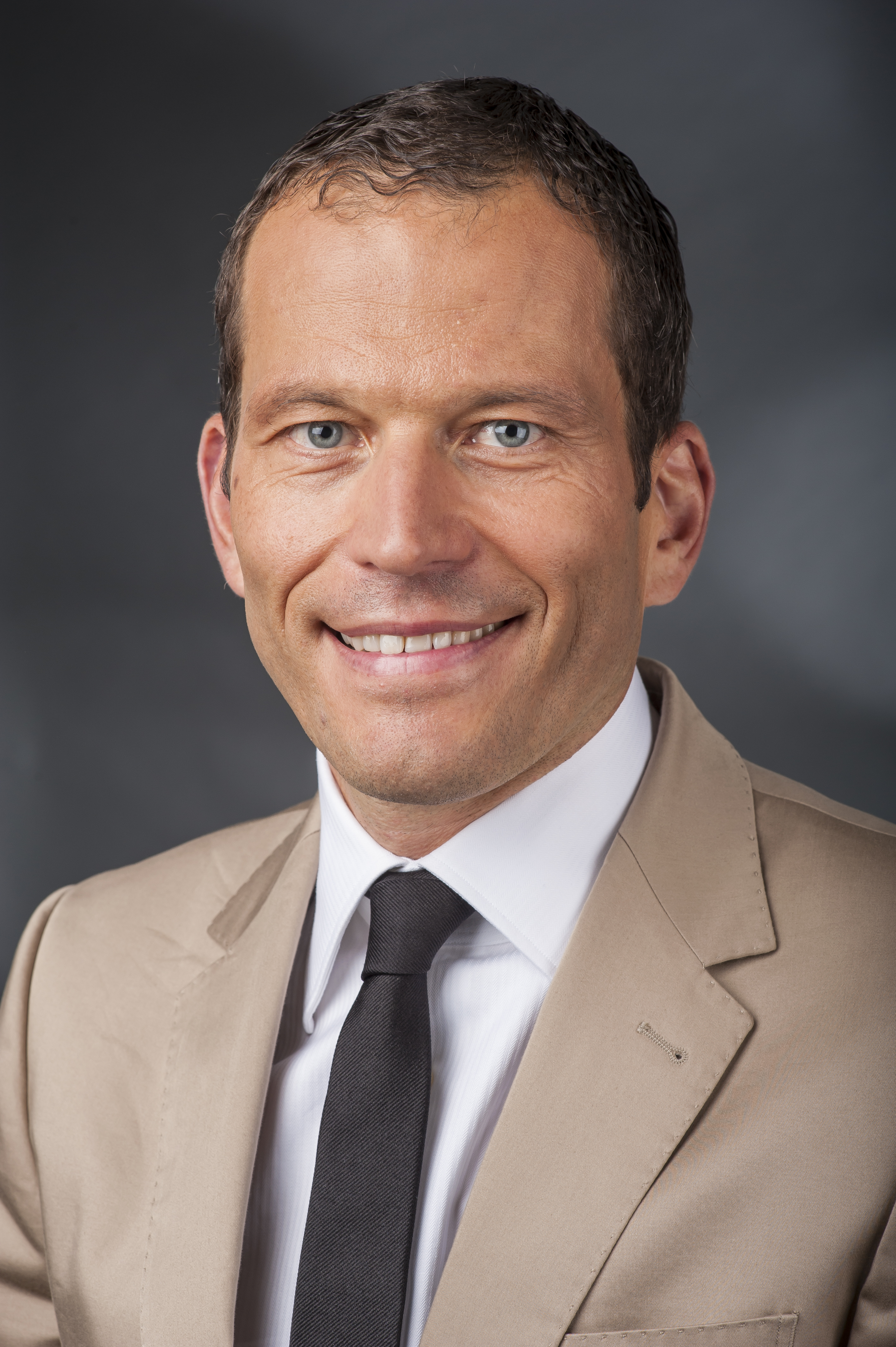
- Rupprecht in 2014

Member of the Bundestag; from Bavaria
- Incumbent
- Assumed office 17 October 2002
- Constituency: State list (2002–2005); Weiden (2005–present)

Personal details
- Born: 10 June 1968 (age 58) Waldthurn, West Germany
- Party: Christian Social Union
- Children: 2
- Education: University of Regensburg

Albert Rupprecht (born 10 June 1968) is a German politician of the Christian Social Union (CSU) who has been serving as a member of the Bundestag from the state of Bavaria since 2002.

== Political career ==
Rupprecht first became a member of the Bundestag in the 2002 German federal election, representing the Weiden district. In parliament, he initially served as deputy chair of the Committee on Economic Affairs from 2005 to 2009. In 2009, he moved to the Committee for Education, Research and Technology Assessment. Also since 2009, he has been the CDU/CSU parliamentary group's spokesperson on education and research.

From 2008 to 2010, Rupprecht chaired the parliamentary body providing oversight of the Special Financial Market Stabilization Funds (SoFFin).

In the negotiations to form a fourth coalition government under Chancellor Angela Merkel following the 2017 federal elections, Rupprecht was part of the working group on education policy, led by Annegret Kramp-Karrenbauer, Stefan Müller and Hubertus Heil.

== Other activities ==
- Eckert & Ziegler, Member of the Supervisory Board (since 2017)

== Political positions ==
In June 2017, Rupprecht voted against Germany's introduction of same-sex marriage.
