= Franz Bopp =

German philologist (1791–1867)

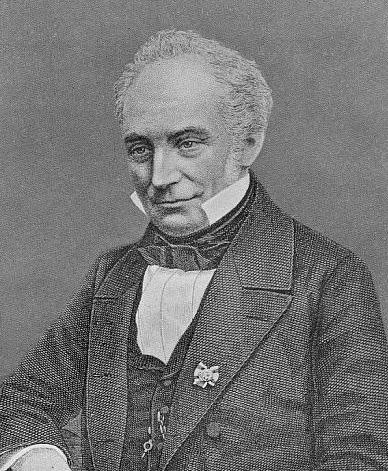
- Born: 14 September 1791; Mainz, Electorate of Mainz, Holy Roman Empire
- Died: 23 October 1867 (aged 76); Berlin, Province of Brandenburg, Kingdom of Prussia, North German Confederation

Academic background
- Academic advisor: Karl Joseph Hieronymus Windischmann

Academic work
- Discipline: Linguistics
- School or tradition: Romantic linguistics
- Institutions: University of Berlin
- Notable students: Georg Curtius; Wilhelm Dilthey
- Notable ideas: Comparative linguistics

Franz Bopp (German: [ˈfʁants ˈbɔp]; 14 September 1791 – 23 October 1867) (Note: Formerly sometimes anglicized as Francis Bopp) was a German linguist known for extensive and pioneering comparative work on Indo-European languages.

== Early life ==
Bopp was born in Mainz, but the political disarray in the Republic of Mainz caused his parents' move to Aschaffenburg, the second seat of the Archbishop of Mainz. There he received a liberal education at the Lyceum and Karl Joseph Hieronymus Windischmann drew his attention to the languages and literature of the East. (Windischmann, along with Georg Friedrich Creuzer, Joseph Görres, and the brothers Schlegel, expressed great enthusiasm for Indian wisdom and philosophy.) Moreover, Karl Wilhelm Friedrich von Schlegel's book, Über die Sprache und Weisheit der Indier (On the Speech and Wisdom of the Indians, Heidelberg, 1808), had just begun to exert a powerful influence on the minds of German philosophers and historians, and stimulated Bopp's interest in the sacred language of the Hindus.

== Career ==
In 1812, he went to Paris at the expense of the Bavarian government, with a view to devoting himself vigorously to the study of Sanskrit. There he enjoyed the society of such eminent men as Antoine-Léonard de Chézy (his primary instructor), Silvestre de Sacy, Louis Mathieu Langlès, and, above all Alexander Hamilton (1762–1824), cousin of the American statesman of the same name, who had acquired an acquaintance with Sanskrit when in India and had brought out, along with Langlès, a descriptive catalogue of the Sanskrit manuscripts of the Imperial Library.

In the library, Bopp had access not only to the rich collection of Sanskrit manuscripts (mostly brought from India by Jean François Pons in the early 18th century), but also to the Sanskrit books that had been issued from the Calcutta and Serampore presses. He spent five years of laborious study, almost living in the libraries of Paris and unmoved by the turmoils that agitated the world around him, including Napoleon's escape, the Waterloo campaign and the Restoration.

The first paper from his years of study in Paris appeared in Frankfurt am Main in 1816, under the title of Über das Konjugationssystem der Sanskritsprache in Vergleichung mit jenem der griechischen, lateinischen, persischen und germanischen Sprache (On the Conjugation System of Sanskrit in comparison with that of Greek, Latin, Persian and Germanic), to which Windischmann contributed a preface. In this first book, Bopp entered at once the path on which he would focus the philological researches of his whole subsequent life. His task was not to point out the similarity of Sanskrit with Persian, Greek, Latin or German, for previous scholars had long established that, but he aimed to trace the postulated common origin of the languages' grammatical forms, of their inflections from composition. This was something no predecessor had attempted. By a historical analysis of those forms, as applied to the verb, he furnished the first trustworthy materials for a history of the languages compared.

After a brief sojourn in Germany, Bopp travelled to London where he made the acquaintance of Sir Charles Wilkins and Henry Thomas Colebrooke. He also became friends with Wilhelm von Humboldt, the Prussian ambassador at the Court of St. James's, to whom he taught Sanskrit. He brought out, in the Annals of Oriental Literature (London, 1820), an essay entitled "Analytical Comparison of the Sanskrit, Greek, Latin and Teutonic Languages" in which he extended to all parts of grammar what he had done in his first book for the verb alone. He had previously published a critical edition, with a Latin translation and notes, of the story of Nala and Damayanti (London, 1819), the most beautiful episode of the Mahabharata. Other episodes of the Mahabharata, Indralokâgama, and three others (Berlin, 1824); Diluvium, and three others (Berlin, 1829); a new edition of Nala (Berlin, 1832) followed in due course, all of which, with August Wilhelm von Schlegel's edition of the Bhagavad Gita (1823), proved excellent aids in initiating the early student into the reading of Sanskrit texts. On the publication, in Calcutta, of the whole Mahabharata, Bopp discontinued editing Sanskrit texts and confined himself thenceforth exclusively to grammatical investigations.

After a short residence at Göttingen, Bopp gained, on the recommendation of Humboldt, appointment to the chair of Sanskrit and comparative grammar at the University of Berlin in 1821, which he occupied for the rest of his life. He also became a member of the Royal Prussian Academy the following year.

In 1827, he published his Ausführliches Lehrgebäude der Sanskritsprache (Detailed System of the Sanskrit Language), on which he had worked since 1821. Bopp started work on a new edition in Latin, for the following year, completed in 1832; a shorter grammar appeared in 1834. At the same time he compiled a Sanskrit and Latin Glossary (1830), in which, more especially in the second and third editions (1847 and 1868–71), he also took account of the cognate languages. His chief activity, however, centered on the elaboration of his Comparative Grammar, which appeared in six parts at considerable intervals (Berlin, 1833, 1835, 1842, 1847, 1849, 1852), under the title Vergleichende Grammatik des Sanskrit, Zend, Griechischen, Lateinischen, Litthauischen, Altslawischen, Gotischen und Deutschen (Comparative Grammar of Sanskrit, Zend [Avestan], Greek, Latin, Lithuanian, Old Slavonic, Gothic and German).

How carefully Bopp matured this work emerges from the series of monographs printed in the Transactions of the Berlin Academy (1824–1831), which preceded it. They bear the general title Vergleichende Zergliederung des Sanskrits und der mit ihm verwandten Sprachen (Comparative Analysis of Sanskrit and its related Languages). Two other essays (on the Numerals, 1835) followed the publication of the first part of the Comparative Grammar. Old Slavonian began to take its stand among the languages compared from the second part onwards. E. B. Eastwick translated the work into English in 1845. A second German edition, thoroughly revised (1856–1861), also covered Old Armenian.

In his Comparative Grammar Bopp set himself a threefold task:

1. to give a description of the original grammatical structure of the languages as deduced from their inter-comparison.
2. to trace their phonetic laws.
3. to investigate the origin of their grammatical forms.

The first and second points remained dependent upon the third. As Bopp based his research on the best available sources and incorporated every new item of information that came to light, his work continued to widen and deepen in the making, as can be witnessed from his monographs on the vowel system in the Teutonic languages (1836), on the Celtic languages (1839), on the Old Prussian (1853) and Albanian languages (Über das Albanesische in seinen verwandtschaftlichen Beziehungen, Vienna, 1854), on the accent in Sanskrit and Greek (1854), on the relationship of the Malayo-Polynesian to the Indo-European languages (1840), and on the Caucasian languages (1846). In the last two, the impetus of his genius led him on a wrong track. He is the first philologist to prove Albanian as a separate branch of Indo-European. Bopp was elected a Foreign Honorary Member of the American Academy of Arts and Sciences in 1855 and an international member of the American Philosophical Society in 1863.

== Criticism ==
Critics have charged Bopp with neglecting the study of the native Sanskrit grammars, but in those early days of Sanskrit studies, the great libraries of Europe did not hold the requisite materials; if they had, those materials would have demanded his full attention for years, and such grammars as those of Charles Wilkins and Henry Thomas Colebrooke, from which Bopp derived his grammatical knowledge, had all used native grammars as a basis. The further charge that Bopp, in his Comparative Grammar, gave undue prominence to Sanskrit is disproved by his own words; for, as early as 1820, he gave it as his opinion that frequently, the cognate languages serve to elucidate grammatical forms lost in Sanskrit (Annals of Or. Lit. i. 3), which he further developed in all his subsequent writings.

The Encyclopædia Britannica (11th edition of 1911) assesses Bopp and his work as follows:

Bopp's researches, carried with wonderful penetration into the most minute and almost microscopical details of linguistic phenomena, have led to the opening up of a wide and distant view into the original seats, the closer or more distant affinity, and the tenets, practices and domestic usages of the ancient Indo-European nations, and the science of comparative grammar may truly be said to date from his earliest publication. In grateful recognition of that fact, on the fiftieth anniversary (May 16, 1866) of the date of Windischmann's preface to that work, a fund called Die Bopp-Stiftung, for the promotion of the study of Sanskrit and comparative grammar, was established at Berlin, to which liberal contributions were made by his numerous pupils and admirers in all parts of the globe. Bopp lived to see the results of his labours everywhere accepted, and his name justly celebrated. But he died, on the 23rd of October 1867, in poverty, though his genuine kindliness and unselfishness, his devotion to his family and friends, and his rare modesty, endeared him to all who knew him.

English scholar Russell Martineau, who had studied under Bopp, gave the following tribute:

Bopp must, more or less, directly or indirectly, be the teacher of all who at the present day study, not this language or that language, but language itself — study it either as a universal function of man, subjected, like his other mental or physical functions, to law and order, or else as an historical development, worked out by a never ceasing course of education from one form into another.

Martineau also wrote:

"Bopp's Sanskrit studies and Sanskrit publications are the solid foundations upon which his system of comparative grammar was erected, and without which that could not have been perfect. For that purpose, far more than a mere dictionary knowledge of Sanskrit was required. The resemblances which he detected between Sanskrit and the Western cognate tongues existed in the syntax, the combination of words in the sentence and the various devices which only actual reading of the literature could disclose, far more than in the mere vocabulary. As a comparative grammarian he was much more than as a Sanskrit scholar, ... [and yet] it is surely much that he made the grammar, formerly a maze of Indian subtilty, as simple and attractive as that of Greek or Latin, introduced the study of the easier works of Sanskrit literature and trained (personally or by his books) pupils who could advance far higher, invade even the most intricate parts of the literature and make the Vedas intelligible. The great truth which his Comparative Grammar established was that of the mutual relations of the connected languages. Affinities had before him been observed between Latin and German, between German and Slavonic, etc., yet all attempts to prove one the parent of the other had been found preposterous.

== Sources ==
- Baynes, T. S., ed. (1878), "Francis Bopp" , Encyclopædia Britannica, vol. 4 (9th ed.), New York: Charles Scribner's Sons, pp. 49–50
- Martineau, Russell (1867), "Obituary of Franz Bopp", Transactions of the Philological Society, London: 305–14
