= Hotel Geiger =

Demolished building in Germany

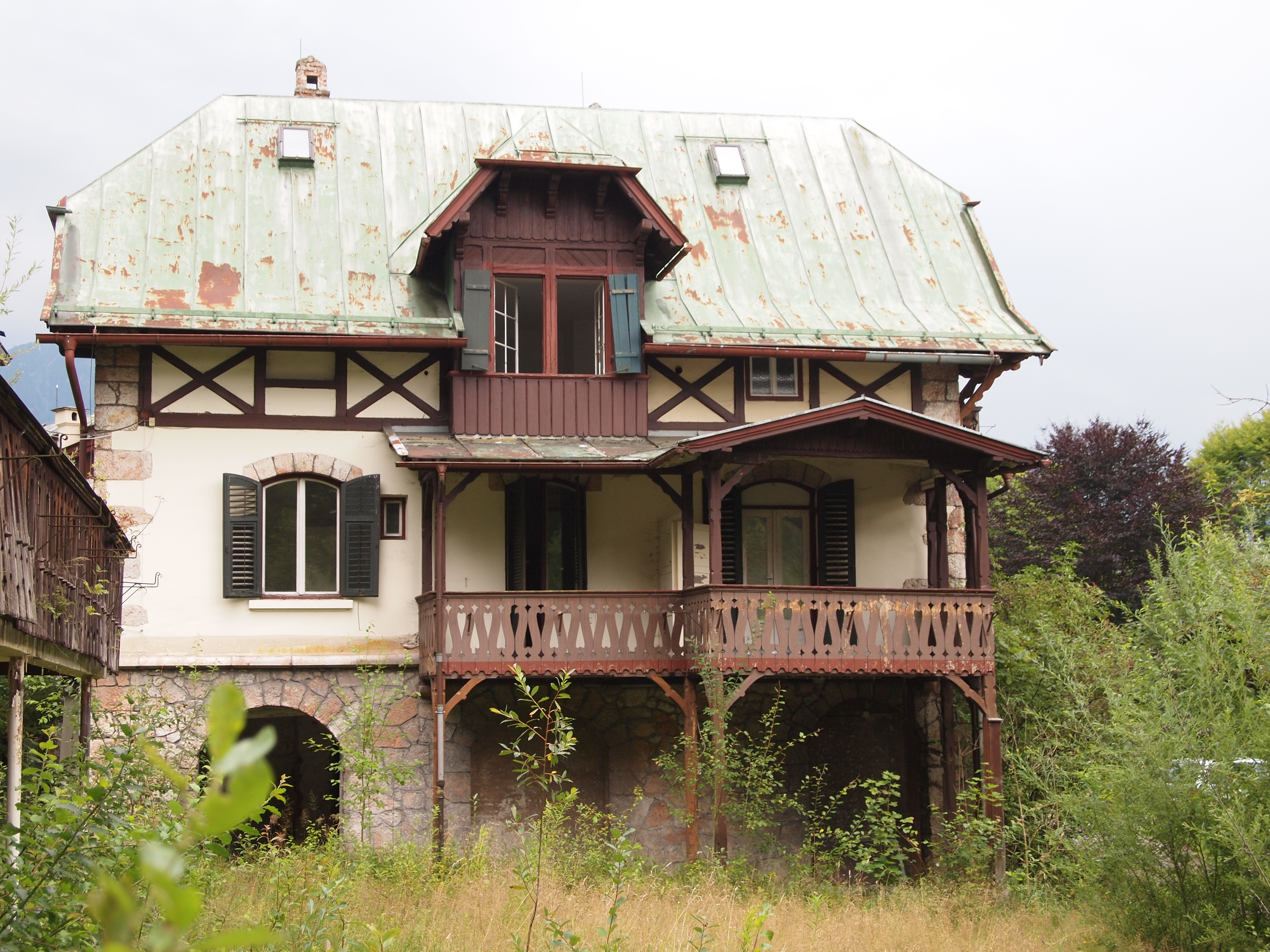
- Hotel Geiger - annex 2012

- Location within Bavaria

General information
- Location: Bischofswiesen, Upper Bavaria, Germany
- Coordinates: 47°37′40″N 12°59′22″E
- Opening: 1866
- Closed: 1997

Design and construction
- Developer: Hugo Geiger (1828 - 1874)

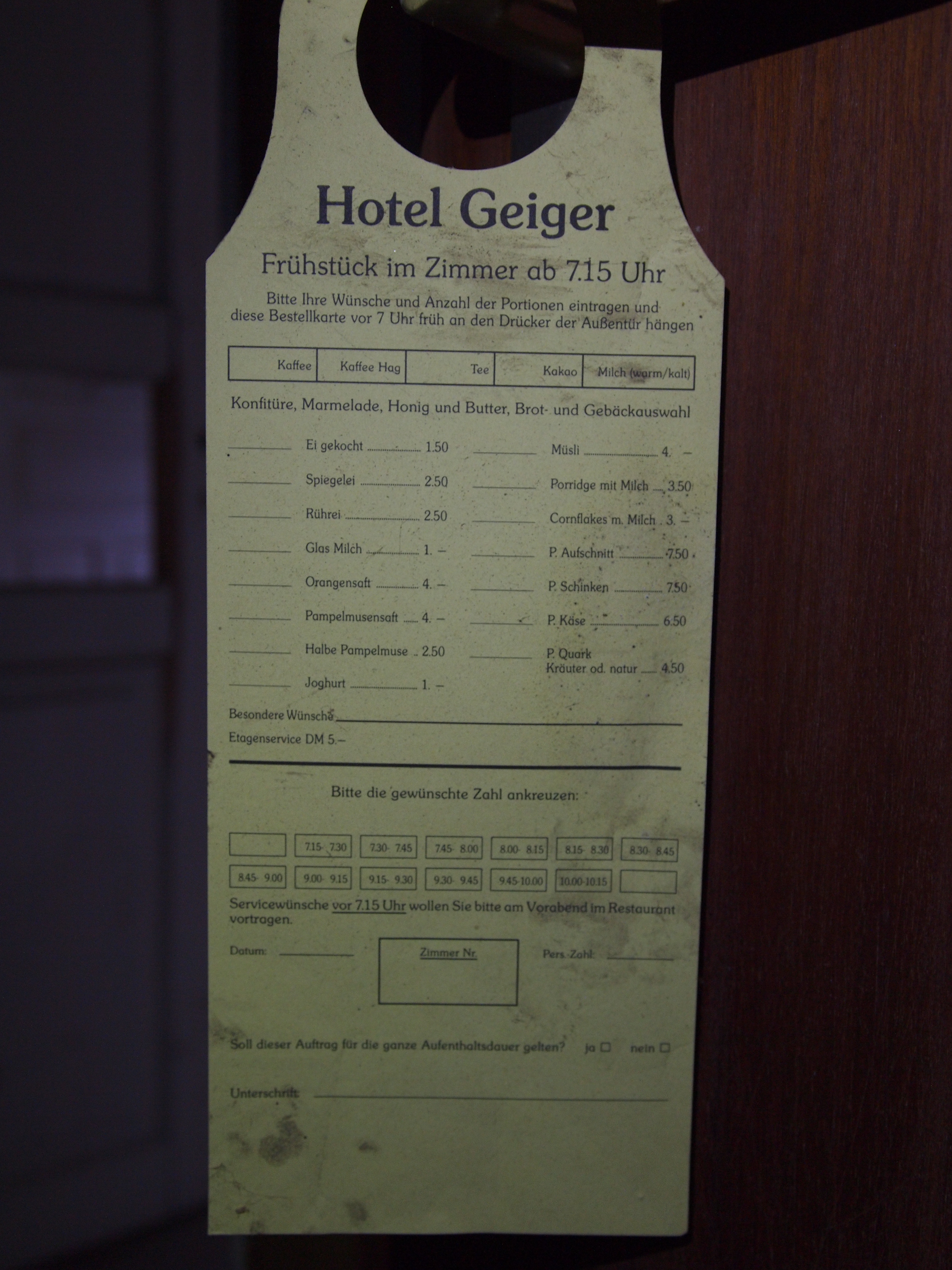
Hotel Geiger: Room-breakfast menu-card

The Hotel Geiger was a traditional hotel complex located in Bischofswiesen, Upper Bavaria, roughly 50 km (35 miles) south of Salzburg. It was opened by Hugo Geiger (1828–1874), a retired customs inspector, as a guest house in 1866 and then progressively extended. By 1924 there were two traditionally styled substantial hotel buildings. During its heyday in late nineteenth and early twentieth centuries the Geiger was a leading hotel, with many financiers and aristocrats among the guests.

In 1997 insolvency forced the closure of the Geiger. It has subsequently been used on a couple of occasions as a film set. Discussions have taken place about selling the site and restoring or replacing the hotel, notably in 2007, but took years any many attempts until the site was sold in 2017 to Bartholomäus "Bartl" Wimmer, a local politician. The buildings have stood empty for decades, demolishing started in 2018, the last building of the site was demolished in January 2019.

== Location ==
The hotel is positioned at the southern edge of the village, on rising land, set in its own grounds approximately 50 meters from the former Bundesstraße (national road) 20 (now superseded by a bye-pass on the western side of the village), leading up a steep road to Berchtesgaden. There is a large annex ("Dependance") constructed to the south of the main building ("Haupthaus") and at an angle to it. Closer to the road, to the north west of the main building is a grouping of buildings including a former laundry, a former gas station and a former home of the hotelier (the "Schneiderhäusl"). On the grounds behind the hotel on its east side are some smaller buildings constructed during the 1960s and 70s including a garage for hotel guests, indoor and outdoor swimming pools. There is also a third accommodation block dating from this period, linked to the main hotel by tunnel, and featuring more luxurious rooms than the older main hotel building and annex.

== History ==
Industrialisation during the nineteenth century led to the rapid growth of an urban middle class in Germany with sufficient time and money to take holidays. The German word for nightmare is "Alptraum", but by 1849 romantic artists such as Ludwig Richter and Caspar David Friedrich had nevertheless shown people how to appreciate the beauty of the Alps. An early convert was King Maximilian of Bavaria who had his summer holiday palace built at Berchtesgaden. The opening in 1860 of the railway between Rosenheim and Salzburg made the region more accessible than hitherto. A rail-link to Bad Reichenhall was added in 1866, which by 1888 had been extended all the way to Berchtesgaden.

Hugo Geiger (1828 - 1874) retired from the Royal Bavarian Customs Service when he was only 37, in 1865, and purchased a small farm house located between Stanggaß (Bischofswiesen) and Berchtesgaden, intending to adapt it as a retirement home where he could live with his wife. Geiger was suffering from ill health, and his wife, who was much younger than he was, and had grown up as the daughter of a guest house owner in northern Bavaria, now took the lead in converting their fifteenth century farm house into a nineteenth century guest house. The project was accompanied by a name change, and the "Hienleitlehen farmhouse" was relaunched in 1866 as the "Haus Geiger" (guesthouse). Growth in guest numbers was sustained by German unification and the new rail connections which made it easier to market the Bavarian Alps as a tourist destination, attracting visitors from Germany's burgeoning industrial regions far beyond Munich. The tourism boom persuaded the Geigers to invest in a major extension of the building in 1874, constructing an extra wing on its south-eastern side.

Hugo Geiger died in 1874. The guest house was taken over by his eldest son, Franz Geiger, and his wife, Nina (born Nina Kriß) who was a member of the local brewing family. During the next two decades the hotel underwent major expansion and moved upmarket. In 1884 rooms in the Main Building were redesigned and elegantly furnished. The architect Wicklein was employed to design a two-storey annex (later known as the "Dependance") to the north of the main building, and this opened in 1890. By 1924 Rudolf Geiger, grandson of the hotel founder, had taken over, and that year he opened a gas/petrol station beside the hotel for the convenience of guests. It was the first gas/petrol station in the locality.

The local economy received a boost in 1933 when Germany's new chancellor purchased a summer villa on the far side of Berchtesgaden a few kilometers away, and set about converting it into a summer residence fit for a leader. The Berghof became something of a German tourist attraction during the mid-1930s. Visitors gathered on nearby public paths in the hope of catching a glimpse of Hitler, which led to a proliferation of security measures and restrictions on access a few kilometers to the east of the hotel. On the other side of the Stanggaß district of Bischofswiesen itself, a twenty-minute walk to the west of the hotel, the authorities constructed the Berchtesgaden Chancelry Branch office ("Reichskanzlei Dienststelle Berchtesgaden"), to which key politicians and government functionaries moved their offices when the chancellor was staying at his summer residence along the road in the other direction. By the time of the Second World War, which broke out in 1939, the Hotel Geiger had become a rest and recreation centre for Luftwaffe officers: caves and tunnels carved into the hillside to provide shelter from bombing date from this period. Early in May 1945 US and French troops arrived in the area, and at the Hotel Geiger US army officers replaced German Luftwaffe officers. One of these, John F. Kennedy, later became President of the United States.

The hotel was subsequently restored to civilian use and significant development took place in 1972 when it acquired its own indoor swimming pool. Bed capacity was increased a few years later when another two floor accommodation block went up in 1976, extended with a third floor in 1982. However, on 1 November 1997, at which point the hotel had been in the Geiger family for more than 130 years, insolvency forced the closure of the hotel. Subsequently, it was used as a setting for one or two films including "Der Winterschläfer" and "Wilde Hühner". It also featured in several episodes of the vetinerary fictional series, "Tierarzt Dr. Quirin Engel" and in one episode of the light-hearted Weißblaue Geschichten series. The buildings continued to be heated and guarded by Stephen Geiger until Summer 1998, after which the banks foreclosed on the furnishings and the buildings began to deteriorate. The site was sold in 2017 to Bartl Wimmer: demolition of the 1960s and 1970s parts of the site started in January 2018.

== Celebrity guests ==
In addition to John F. Kennedy, the guest registers disclose that Prince Maximilian of Baden, later a Chancellor of Germany, stayed at the Geiger in 1911. Other German aristocrats and princelings also visited, and in 1904 Thomas Mann was a guest. Hotel guests between 1945 and 1997 included Anwar Sadat, Walter Scheel, Pierre Trudeau, Prince Albert of Monaco, The Bee Gees and Elvis Presley.
