= Tobias Moretti =

Austrian actor (born 1959)

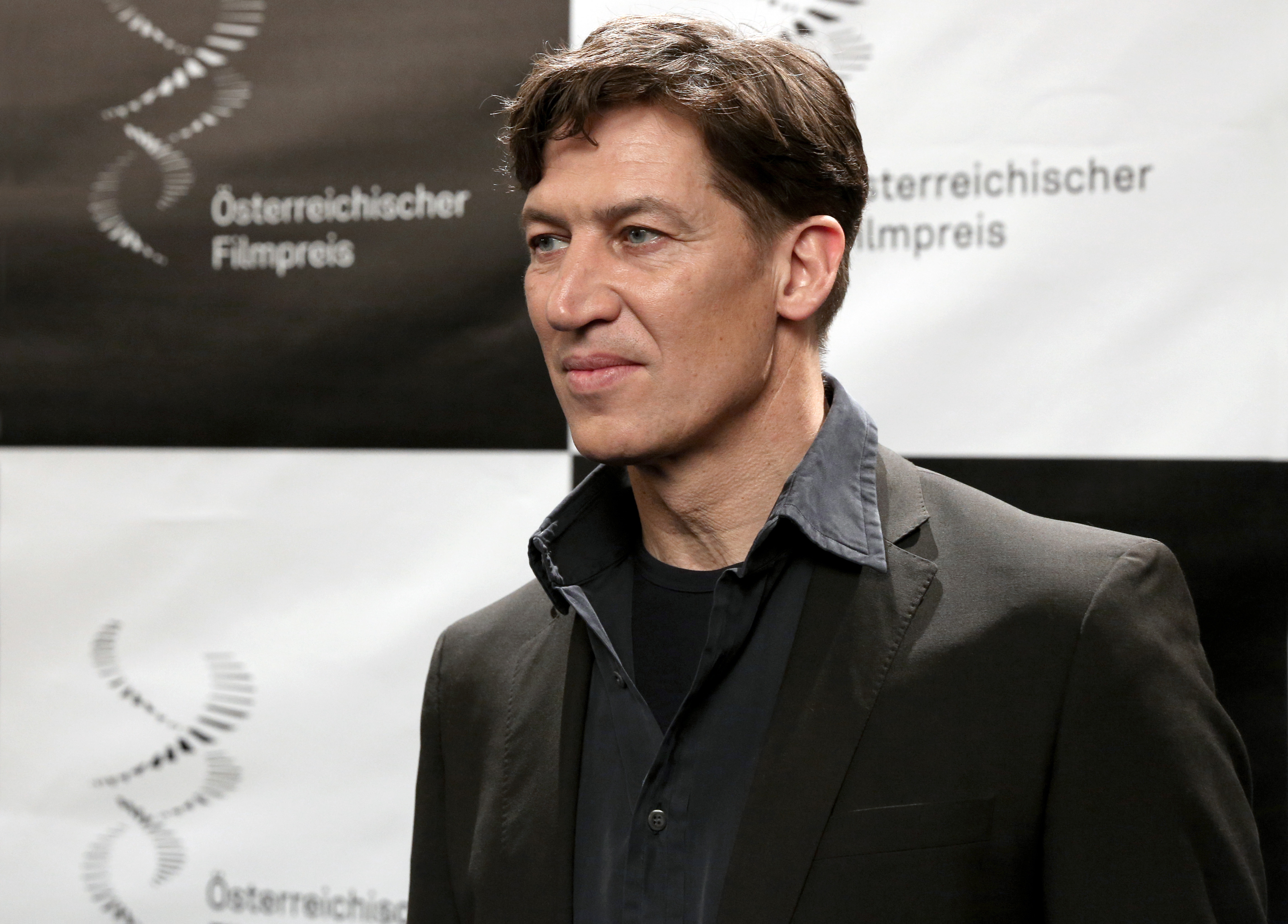
- Moretti in 2015
- Born: Tobias Bloéb; 11 July 1959 (age 66); Gries am Brenner, Tyrol, Austria
- Occupation: Actor
- Relatives: Gregor Bloéb (brother)

Tobias Moretti (German: [toˈbiːas moˈʁɛti]; born Tobias Bloéb; 11 July 1959) is an Austrian actor.

== Biography ==
Born in Gries am Brenner, Tyrol, Moretti is the eldest of four brothers, including Thomas, Christoph and fellow actor Gregor Bloéb. Since 1997, he has been married to Julia Moretti (née Wilhem), an oboist. They have three children, Antonia (born August 1998), Lenz Valentino (born 14 February 2000) and Rosa Cäcilia (born February 2011). His professional surname comes from his mother, who is of Italian descent.

Moretti studied composition at the Vienna University of Music and Applied Arts, then went to Munich to train for the stage at the renowned Otto-Falckenberg-Schule. After graduation he was a permanent member of the Bayerisches Staatsschauspiel ensemble (Frank Baumbauer) and played at the Munich Kammerspiele (Dieter Dorn) from 1985 to 1995 where he earned critical praise in a sweeping variety of productions, appearing in Bertolt Brecht's Man is Man, Achternbusch's Der Frosch (The Frog) and playing the lead in Shakespeare's Troilus and Cressida.

Moretti appeared in the TV series Inspector Rex from 1994 to 1998 as Richard Moser, the main policeman in the murder unit.

== Filmography ==
- Wilhelm Busch (1986, TV film), as Young Wilhelm Busch
- The Curse (1988), as Mountain rescue service
- Die Piefke-Saga (1990, TV miniseries), as Josef 'Joe' Rotter
- Der Rausschmeißer (1990), as Harry
- Inspector Rex (1994–1998, TV series, 45 episodes), as Richard Moser
- Night of Nights (1995, TV film)
- Unser Opa ist der Beste (1995, TV film), as Wolfgang Ohr
- Workaholic (1996), as Max
- Silent Night (1997, TV film), as Pastor Joseph Mohr
- Die Bernauerin (1997, TV film), as Herzog Albrecht
- Ein Herz wird wieder jung (1997), as Paul
- Mein Opa und die 13 Stühle (1997, TV film), as Wolfgang Ohr
- Mortal Friends (1998, TV film), as Nico Möller
- Clarissa (1998, TV film), as Gottfried
- Krambambuli (1998, TV film), as Wolf Pachler
- Mia, Liebe meines Lebens (1998, TV miniseries), as Johnny Ryan
- Your Best Years (1999, TV film), as Manfred Minke
- Shadows (1999, TV film), as Davide Berger
- Alphamann (1999, TV series, 1 episode), as Martin Buchmüller
- Joseph of Nazareth (1999, TV film), as Joseph
- Rock Crystal (1999, TV film), as Joseph
- Die Nichte und der Tod (1999, TV film), as Jeff Meltzer
- Das Tattoo – Tödliche Zeichen (2000, TV film), as Karl
- Trivial Pursuit (2000, TV film), as Paul
- Dance with the Devil (2001, TV film), as Georg Kufbach
- Julius Caesar (2002, TV miniseries), as Gaius Cassius
- Ein Hund kam in die Küche (2002, TV film), as Stefan Schuster
- Gefährliche Nähe und du ahnst nichts (2002, TV film), as Harry Möllemann
- Andreas Hofer (2002, TV film), as Andreas Hofer
- All Around the Town (2002, TV film), as Billy Hawkins aka Bic
- Der Narr und seine Frau heute Abend in Pancomedia (2002, TV film), as Zacharias Werner
- Swabian Children (2003, TV film), as Kooperator
- Käthchens Traum (2004, TV film), as Friedrich Wetter Count von Strahl
- Jedermann (2004, TV film), as Jedermanns guter Gesell/Teufel
- The Return of the Dancing Master (2004, TV film), as Stefan Lindman
- Speer und Er (Speer and Hitler: The Devil's Architect, 2005, TV miniseries), as Adolf Hitler
- König Ottokars Glück und Ende (2006, TV film), as King Ottokar II of Bohemia
- Impossibly Yours (2006), as Leonhard
- Erased (2006, TV film), as Luis Kramer
- Der Kronzeuge (2007, TV film), as Achim Weber
- Treasure Island (2007, TV film), as Long John Silver
- Du gehörst mir (2007, TV film), as Wolf
- 42plus (2007), as Martin
- Midsummer Madness (2007), as Peteris
- Ten: Umbra Mortis (2008, TV film), as Thomas Dorn
- I, Don Giovanni (2009), as Casanova
- Seeking Whom He May Devour (2009, TV film), as Lawrence
- Black Flowers (2009), as Michael Roddick
- Anna and the Prince (2009, TV film), as Archduke John of Austria
- Jew Suss: Rise and Fall (2010), as Ferdinand Marian
- Amigo (2010, TV film), as Amigo Steiger
- Violetta (2011, TV film), as Antonio Caleffi
- The Weekend (2012), as Ulrich Lansky
- Mobbing (2012, TV film), as Jo Rühler
- The Decent One (2014), as Heinrich Himmler
- The Dark Valley (2014), as Hans Brenner
- Therapy for a Vampire (2014), as Count Geza von Közsnöm
- The Witness House (2014, TV film), as Rudolf Diels
- Life Eternal (2015), as Aschenbrenner
- Luis Trenker (2015, TV film), as Luis Trenker
- Berlin One (2015, TV film), as Immanuel Tauss
- Brothers of the Wind (2015), as Keller
- Cold Hell (2017), as Steiner
- Bad Banks (2018, TV series, 6 episodes), as Quirin Sydow
- Mack the Knife: Brecht's Threepenny Film (2018), as Macheath
- A Hidden Life (2019), as Vicar Ferdinand Fürthauer
- The German Lesson (2019), as Max Ludwig Nansen
- Louis van Beethoven (2020, TV film), as Ludwig van Beethoven

== Awards ==
- Bavarian TV Awards – for Kommissar Rex (1995), Schwabenkinder (2004)
- German Television Awards – for Kommissar Rex (1996), The Return of the Dancing Master (2004)
- Adolf Grimme Awards, Germany – for Tanz mit dem Teufel – Die Entführung des Richard Oetker, (2002), Krambambuli (1999)
- Golden Cable, Germany – for Kommissar Rex (1996)
- Golden Lion Awards – for Kommissar Rex (1996)
- Romy Gala, Austria – for Favorite Actor (Beliebtester Schauspieler) (2000, 2001, 2002, 2003, 2004, 2005)
- Italian Telegatto – for Kommissar Rex (1998)
- Gertrud-Eysoldt-Ring – for König Ottokars Glück und Ende (festival in Salzburg)
