= Hans Bodensteiner =

German politician (1912–1995)

Member of the Bundestag; for Tirschenreuth
- In office 7 September 1949 – 6 October 1953
- Preceded by: Constituency established
- Succeeded by: Hugo Geiger

Personal details
- Born: 12 November 1912 Moosbach, Germany
- Died: 8 April 1995 (aged 82) Unkel, Germany
- Party: All-German People's Party (1952–1953)
- Other political affiliations: CSU (1949–1952)
- Education: University of Würzburg

Hans Bodensteiner (12 November 1912 – 8 April 1995) was a German politician, representative of the Christian Social Union in Bavaria and the GVP.

== See also ==
- List of Bavarian Christian Social Union politicians
