= Karl Joseph Hieronymus Windischmann =

German philosopher and anthropologist (1775– 1839)

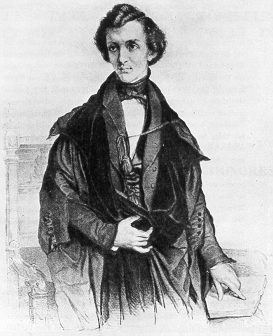
- Born: 25 August 1775; Mainz, Electorate of Mainz
- Died: 23 April 1839 (aged 63); Bonn, Kingdom of Prussia
- Spouse: Anna Maria Pizzala (m. 1797; died 1839)
- Children: 4, including Friedrich

Academic background
- Education: University of Mainz; University of Würzburg

Academic work
- Institutions: University of Bonn
- Notable students: Franz Bopp
- Notable ideas: Pantheistic mysticism

Karl Joseph Hieronymus Windischmann (25 August 1775 – 23 April 1839) was a German philosopher and anthropologist.

== Biography ==
Karl Windischmann attended the Gymnasium in Mainz, and in 1772 took the course in philosophy at the university there. He continued this course at the University of Würzburg, where he also studied the natural sciences and medicine until 1796. After a year at Vienna, he settled in 1797 as a practising physician at Mainz, where he also gave medical lectures; in 1801 the Elector of Mainz, Friedrich Karl Joseph von Erthal, summoned him to Aschaffenburg as court physician.

In 1803, Windischmann became professor of philosophy and history at the institute for philosophy and theology at Aschaffenburg, and in 1818 was appointed professor of philosophy and medicine at the University of Bonn. He took an active part against the ideas of George Hermes at the University of Bonn, and when the investigation of Hermesianism began at Rome, he was one of the German scholars directed to draw up opinions. The first part of his report was sent to Rome in June, 1834, the second part in March, 1835; the Hermesians consequently attributed to Windischmann a large share in the condemnation of their views.

In his earlier years Windischmann's philosophy, as shown in his work Ideen zur Physik (I, Würzburg and Bamberg, 1805), was a pantheistic mysticism under the influence of Schelling's philosophy of nature. He believed, however, that he could unite it with Christianity. But gradually he worked his way into a Christian philosophy. In his chief work, Die Philosophie im Fortgang der Weltgeschichte (Philosophy in the Progress of World History), he planned to present the history of philosophy in connection with a positive Christian philosophy of history which was influenced by Hegel. But the work was not finished; of its four volumes (Bonn, 1827–1834) only the first, dealing with China and Japan were printed.

His son was the orientalist and theologian Friedrich Heinrich Hugo Windischmann.

== Bibliography ==
- Von der Selbstvernichtung der Zeit und der Hoffnung zur Wiedergeburt (Heidelberg 1807).
- Das Gericht des Herrn über Europa. Blicke in Vergangenheit, Gegenwart und Zukunft (Frankfurt a. M. 1814).
- Was Johannes von Müller wesentlich war und uns ferner sein müsse (Winterthur 1811).
- Untersuchungen über Astrologie, Alchimie und Magic (Frankfurt, 1813).
- Ueber Etwas, das der Heilkunft Noth thut (Leipzig, 1824), in which he opposed what he saw as the materialistic tendency in medical science, and sought to combine the science with Christian philosophy;
- Das Gericht des Herrn über Europa (Frankfurt, 1814).
- Ueber den Begriff der christl. Philosophie (Bonn, 1823).
- Supplementary treatises for Moriz Lieber's translation (Abendstunden zu St. Petersburg, Frankfurt, 1824) of Joseph de Maistre. His last work was the editing of Friedrich von Schlegel's Philosophische Vorlesungen (Bonn, 1836–1837).
