= Wilhelm Geiger =

German Orientalist and historian (1856–1943)

Wilhelm Geiger

Wilhelm Ludwig Geiger (/ˈɡaɪɡər/; German: [ˈɡaɪɡɐ]; 21 July 1856 – 2 September 1943) was a German Orientalist in the fields of Indo-Iranian languages and the history of Iran and Sri Lanka. He was known as a specialist in Pali, Sinhala language and the Dhivehi language of the Maldives. He is especially known for his work on the Sri Lankan chronicles Mahāvaṃsa and Cūlavaṃsa and made critical editions of the Pali text and English translations with the help of assistant translators.

== Life ==
He was born in Nuremberg, the son of an evangelical clergyman, and was educated especially at the University of Erlangen-Nuremberg under the scholar Friedrich von Spiegel. During his studies, he joined the fraternity Uttenruthia. After completing his Ph.D. thesis in 1878, he became a lecturer on ancient Iranian and Indian philology and then a master at a gymnasium. In 1891 he was offered a chair in Indo-European Comparative Philology at the University of Erlangen, succeeding Spiegel. His first published works were on ancient Iranian history, archaeology and philology.

Geiger made three visits to Ceylon in 1895–96, 1925–26 and 1931–32.

Geiger married twice. His first wife was Marie Plochmann (1858–1910) and second wife was Magdalene Grobe (1877- ?). He died in Neubiberg.

Among his children were included the physicist Hans Geiger (1882–1945), inventor of the Geiger counter, and the meteorologist Rudolf Geiger.

== Works ==
=== English works and translations ===
- The Age of the Avesta and Zoroaster, co-authored with Friedrich Spiegel, translated into English by Dārāb Dastur Peshotan Sanjānā, London 1886 (Google-US)
- Civilization of the eastern Iranians in ancient times, with an introduction on the Avesta religion, translated into English by Darab Dastur Peshotan Sanjana, London 1885–1886.
- Zarathushtra in the Gathas, and in the Greek and Roman classics, co-authored with Friedrich Heinrich Hugo Windischmann; translated into English by Dārāb Dastur Peshotan Sanjānā, Leipzig 1897.
- The Dīpavaṃsa and Mahāvaṃsa and their historical development in Ceylon, translated into English by Ethel M. Coomaraswamy, Colombo 1908 (Google-US)
- The Mahavāmsa or the Great Chronicle of Ceylon, English translation assisted by Mabel Haynes Bode, Pali Text Society, London 1912 (Internet Archive)
- Maldivian Linguistic Studies, Colombo 1919.
- The Language of the Väddās, Calcutta 1935.
- A Grammar of the Sinhala language, Colombo 1938.
- Pali Literature and Language, translated by Batakrishna Ghosh from the German original, Calcutta 1943. Revised by K. R. Norman under the title A Pali Grammar, Oxford 1994.
- Cūlavamsa : being the more recent part of the Mahāvamsa, English translation assisted by Christian Mabel Duff Rickmers, Colombo 1953.
- Culture of Ceylon in mediaeval times, edited by Heinz Bechert, Wiesbaden 1960.

=== German works ===
- Aogemadaêcâ: ein Pârsentractat in Pâzend, Altbaktrisch und Sanskrit. Erlangen, 1878 (Google)
- Das Yātkār-i Zarirān und sein Verhältnis zum Šāh-nāme [The Yātkār-i Zarirān and its Relation to the Šāhnāme]. von W. Geiger. München: Druck der Akademischen Buchdrukerei von F. Straub. 1890
- Die Pehleviversion des Ersten Capitels des Vendîdâd herausgegeben nebst dem Versuch einer ersten Uebersetzung und Erklärung. Erlangen, 1877 (Google)
- Handbuch der Awestasprache. Grammatik, Chrestomathie und Glossar. Erlangen, 1879 (Google-US)
- Etymologie des Balūčī. Aus den Abhandlungen der k. bayer. Akademie der Wiss. I. Cl. XIX. Bd. I. Abth. München, 1890 (Google-US)
- Etymologie des Singhalesischen. Aus den Abhandlungen der k. bayer. Akademie der Wiss. I. Cl. XXI. Bd. II. Abth. München, 1897 (Google-US)
- Ceylon. Tagebuchblätter und Reiseerinnerungen. Wiesbaden, 1898 (Google-US)
- Wilhelm Geiger & Ernst Kuhn (Hrsg.): Grundriß der iranischen Philologie. 1. Bd., 1. Abt., Straßburg 1895–1901 (Google-US, Google-US); Anhang zum 1. Bd., Straßburg, 1903 (Google-US); II. Bd., Straßburg, 1896–1904 (, Google-US)
- Litteratur und Sprache der Singhalesen. Straßburg, 1900 (Google-US)
- Dīpavamsa und Mahāvamsa, die beiden Chroniken der Insel Ceylon. Sonderabdruck aus der Festschrift der Universität Erlangen zur Feier des achtzigsten Geburtstages Sr. königlichen Hoheit des Prinzregenten Luitpold von Bayern. Erlangen & Leipzig, 1901 (Google-US)
- Dīpavaṃsa und Mahāvaṃsa und die geschichtliche Überlieferung in Ceylon, Leipzig, 1905 (Google-US)
- Wilhelm Geiger & Magdalene Geiger: Pāli Dhamma vornehmlich in der kanonischen Literatur, München, 1920.
- Wilhelm Geiger: Elementarbuch des Sanskrit, de Gruyter, Berlin und Leipzig, 1923.
- Wilhelm Geiger: Besprechung zu Heinrich Junker, Arische Forschungen, um 1930.
- Wilhelm Geiger: Singhalesische Etymologien. Stephen Austin and Sons, 1936.
- Wilhelm Geiger: Beiträge zur singhalesischen Sprachgeschichte, Bayerischen Akad. der Wiss., München 1942.
- Wilhelm Geiger: Kleine Schriften zur Indologie und Buddhismuskunde, hrsg. von Heinz Bechert. Steiner, Wiesbaden 1973.
- Wilhelm Geiger: Die Reden des Buddha: Gruppierte Sammlung, Saṃyutta-nikāya, translation of Saṃyutta-nikāya, Beyerlein-Steinschulte, Stammbach, 1997.
