= Geiger (crater) =

Crater on the Moon

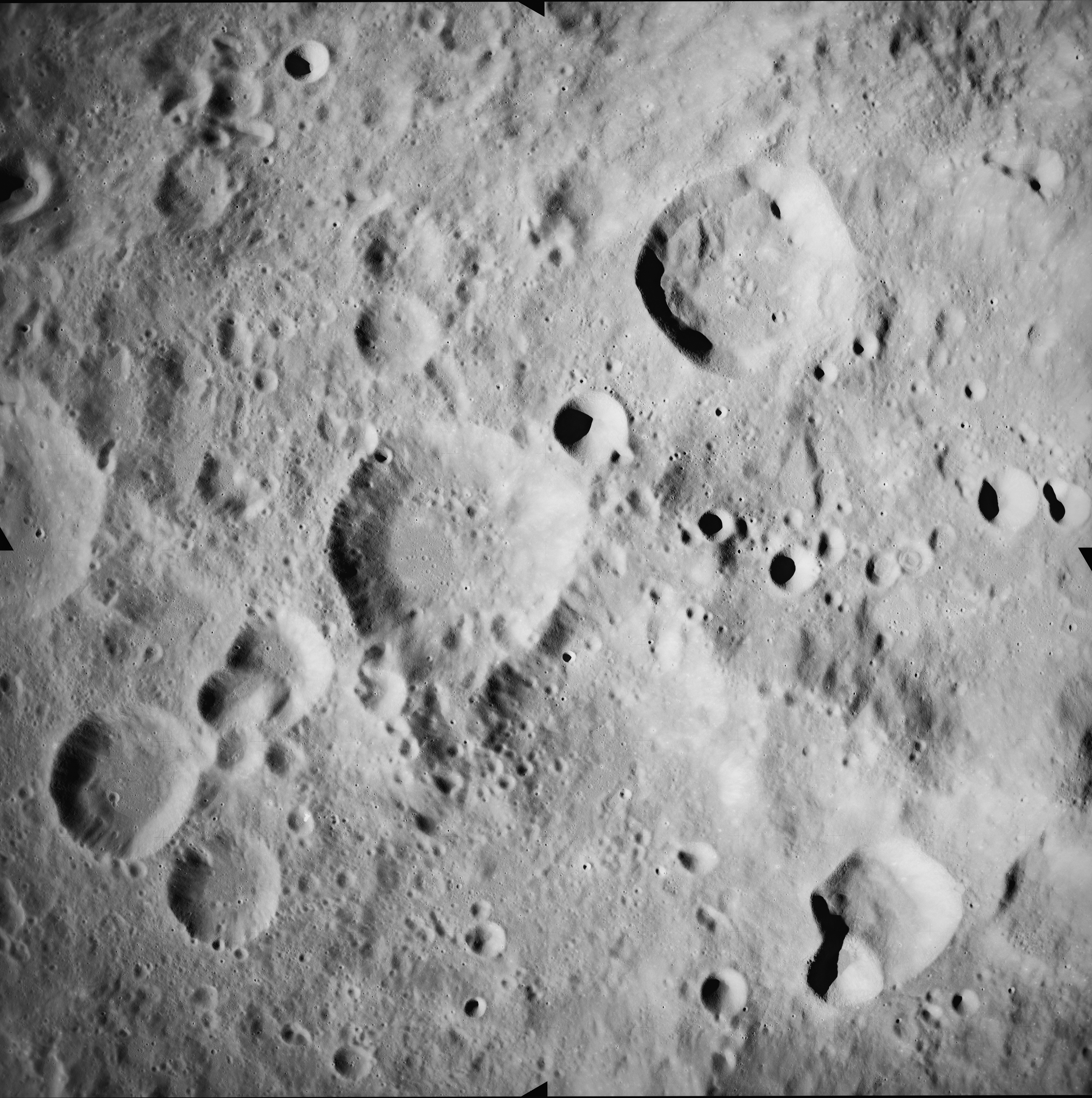
- Geiger (upper right) from Apollo 17. To the lower left is Geiger R. NASA photo.
- Coordinates: 14.6°S 158.5°E
- Diameter: 34 km
- Depth: Unknown
- Colongitude: 202° at sunrise
- Eponym: Johannes H. W. Geiger

Geiger is a lunar impact crater on the far side of the Moon. It lies to the southwest of the much larger walled plain named Keeler, and slightly farther to the northeast of the huge walled plain Gagarin. To the south is the crater Cyrano.

This is a not-quite symmetrical crater formation with small outward bulges along the north and northeast. The rim to the southeast is less well-formed than elsewhere. The northern inner wall is more extensive than elsewhere, slumping across about one-third the inner floor. The interior is otherwise relatively level and is marked by a few tiny craterlets.

== Satellite craters ==
By convention these features are identified on lunar maps by placing the letter on the side of the crater midpoint that is closest to Geiger.

Geiger	Latitude	Longitude	Diameter
K	16.0° S	159.9° E	11 km
L	16.3° S	159.3° E	6 km
R	15.7° S	156.5° E	40 km
Y	12.7° S	158.1° E	29 km
