= Geiger, South Sudan =

Town in South Sudan

Geiger Arabic: القیقر
- Border Town
- Location within South Sudan
- Coordinates: 11°59′36″N 32°45′41″E
- Country: South Sudan
- Region: Greater Upper Nile
- State: Upper Nile
- County: Renk County
- Payam: Geiger Payam

Government
  - Chief administrative officer: Dok Lual

Population
  - Total: 2,000 - 3,000 refugees
- Time zone: UTC+2 (WAT)
- Area code: 7G3JXQV6+8H

Geiger (Arabic: القیقر), is a border town in the Renk County of Upper Nile State, in the Greater Upper Nile region of South Sudan. It is notable for the refugee crisis from South Sudan into Sudan due to the South Sudanese Civil War. It is situated along the White Nile.
