= Giger =

Giger is a surname. Notable people with the surname include:

- Albert Giger (1946–2021), Swiss cross-country skier
- Fabrice Giger (born 1965), Swiss publisher and film producer
- H. R. Giger (1940–2014), Swiss painter, sculptor, and set designer
- Paul Giger (born 1952), Swiss violinist and composer
- Peter Giger (born 1939), Swiss percussionist and bandleader
- Raoul Giger (born 1997), Swiss footballer
- Walter Giger (1943–2025), Swiss environmental chemist
- Werner Giger (1949–1974), Swiss motorcycle racer

== See also ==
- Geiger
- Guyger
