= John H. Geiger =

American architect

- Born: John Henry Geiger; June 19, 1925; Council Bluffs, Iowa, US
- Died: January 10, 2011 (aged 85); Chicago, Illinois, US
- Resting place: Abraham Lincoln National Cemetery, Elwood, Illinois; 41°23′18.0″N 88°08′02.0″W
- Education: University of Illinois
- Occupations: Architect, engineer
- Title: National Commander of The American Legion
- Term: 1971–1972
- Predecessor: Alfred P. Chamie
- Successor: Joe L. Matthews
- Spouse: Vivienne Geiger
- Military career
- Allegiance: United States
- Branch: United States Army
- Rank: Technician Fifth Grade
- Conflicts: World War II

John Henry Geiger (June 19, 1925 – January 10, 2011) was an American architect and engineer who served as the National Commander of The American Legion from 1971 to 1972.

== Early life and career ==
On June 19, 1925, John Henry Geiger was born to Hugo and Martha (Thies) Geiger in Council Bluffs, Iowa. He moved several times during his youth, living in Minden, Crespo, Belle Plaine, and Winterset, Iowa. His father directed units of the Civilian Conservation Corps during the Great Depression and was influential in bringing The American Legion to Iowa starting John's interest in the subject. At age 17, he joined the Army, serving in the 42nd Tank Battalion, 11th Armored Division, and then the 35th Tank Battalion, 4th Armored Division. He participated in the Battle of the Bulge and the Army of Occupation in Germany. After the Second World War ended, he returned to the United States. Upon returning to the United States, He went to the University of Illinois where he received an Architecture and an Engineering degree. He returned to Iowa and started his own architecture firm, "John H. Geiger and Associates". In 1966, he was offered a position at United Airlines, which he accepted. While the famed architect Helmut Jahn designed United's O'Hare Terminal 1 in 1987, it was Geiger who supervised its construction.

== The American Legion ==
Geiger joined The American Legion before leaving active service in 1945, becoming Illinois Commander in 1960 and National Commander in 1971. His tenure as National Commander was marked with his campaign for better healthcare for veterans and opposition to blanket amnesty for draft dodgers. He was also a staunch defender of presidential power during the Vietnam war saying, "Any limitations on the ability of the president as commander in chief to conduct military operations in southeast Asian would endanger the lives of our fighting men and make more difficult the achievement of a just peace". He believed those who objected to President Richard Nixon's war policies were" divisive and defeatist and likely to encourage Hanoi in its demands". On March 1, 1971, he spoke before the United States Senate Subcommittee on Administrative Practice and Procedure of the Committee on Judiciary on The American Legion's opposition to draft dodging, he believed amnesty would devastate morale of those who served in the war and dishonored the memory of the dead. A large project of his was the Three Letter Campaign as he advised each member of the legion to write three letters: one to their congressman and one to each senator. The purpose of the campaign was to improve the GI Bill for veterans of Vietnam. He later served on the National Commander's Advisory Committee from 1978 to 1999.

== Personal life ==
John Geiger had a wife named Vivienne DeBaets Geiger who died in 1992, a companion named Florence Tanka, and six children.

Non-profit organization positions
Preceded by Alfred P. Chamie	National Commander of The American Legion; 1971–1972	Succeeded by Joe L. Matthews
