= Hugo Geiger =

German politician (1901–1984)

Member of the Bundestag; for Tirschenreuth
- In office 6 October 1953 – 17 October 1961
- Preceded by: Hans Bodensteiner
- Succeeded by: Franz Weigl

Member of the European Parliament; for West Germany
- In office 27 February 1958 – 29 November 1961

Personal details
- Born: 1 April 1901 Furth im Wald, Germany
- Died: 8 July 1984 (aged 83) Munich, West Germany
- Party: Christian Social Union
- Education: LMU Munich; University of Würzburg; University of Erlangen–Nuremberg; TU Berlin

Hugo Geiger (1 July 1901 – 8 July 1984) was a German politician of the Christian Social Union in Bavaria (CSU) and former member of the German Bundestag.

== Life ==
In 1945 Geiger was a member of the Constituent Assembly of Bavaria, and from 1950 to 1953 he was also a member of the state parliament there.

Geiger was a member of the German Bundestag from 1953 to 1961. He represented the constituency of Tirschenreuth in parliament. From 1953 to 1957, Geiger was deputy chairman of the committee pursuant to Article 15 of the Basic Law, from 23 March 1956 to 10 January 1957 chairman of the Bundestag Committee on Atomic Questions, and from 1957 to 1961 deputy chairman of the Committee on Nuclear Energy and Water Management.

From 27 February 1958 to 29 November 1961, Geiger was also a member of the European Parliament.

== Literature ==
Herbst, Ludolf; Jahn, Bruno (2002). Vierhaus, Rudolf (ed.). Biographisches Handbuch der Mitglieder des Deutschen Bundestages. 1949–2002 [Biographical Handbook of the Members of the German Bundestag. 1949–2002] (in German). München: De Gruyter - De Gruyter Saur. p. 1715. ISBN 978-3-11-184511-1.
