= Elia del Medigo =

Sephardic philosopher (c. 1458–c. 1493)

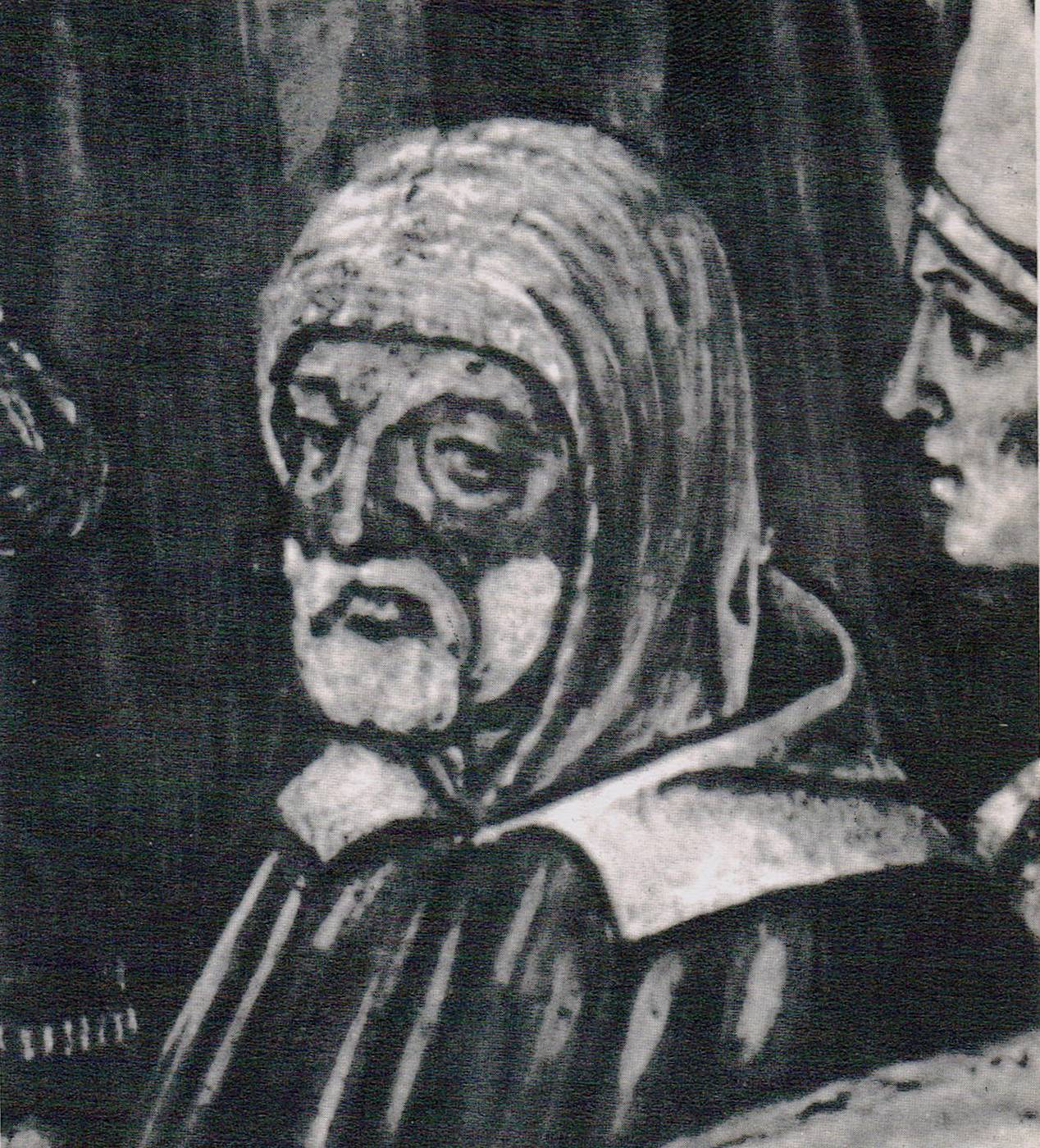
Elia del Medigo

Elia del Medigo (c. 1458 – c. 1493) was also called Elijah Delmedigo or Elias ben Moise del Medigo and was sometimes known to his contemporaries as Helias Hebreus Cretensis or in Hebrew Elijah Mi-Qandia. According to Jacob Joshua Ross, "while the non-Jewish students of Delmedigo may have classified him as an 'Averroist', he clearly saw himself as a follower of Maimonides". But, according to other scholars, Delmedigo was clearly a strong follower of Averroes's doctrines, even the more radical ones: unity of intellect, eternity of the world, autonomy of reason from the boundaries of revealed religion.

Born in Candia, on the island of Crete (which at that time was under the control of the Venetian Republic), whither his family had emigrated from Germany, he spent ten years in Rome and in Padua in northern Italy, returning to Candia at the end of his life.

He is remembered for a number of translations, commentaries on Averroes (notably on his Substantia Orbis in 1485), for his influence on many Italian Platonists of the early Renaissance (especially Giovanni Pico della Mirandola), and for his treatise on Jewish philosophy, Sefer Beḥinat ha-Dat (The Examination of Religion), published many years after his death, in 1629.

== Biography ==
Del Medigo had a traditional religious upbringing in Candia, demonstrating considerable breadth. In addition to rabbinic learning, he studied philosophy, and had a good knowledge of Italian, Greek, as well as Latin and Hebrew. It is likely that he also studied medicine, and it may have been with that intention that he originally went to Padua, where the University was the most important center for traditional Aristotelian philosophy in Italy. By 1480, he was in Venice, where he wrote Quaestio utrum mundus sit effectus, and supported himself by giving classes in Aristotelian philosophy attended by the sons of wealthy and important families.

He moved to Perugia and taught classes in "radical Aristotelianism," that is, heavily interpreted with the ideas of Averroes and other Islamic commentators. Del Medigo became quite well known as a major Averroist in Italy. While in Perugia, he met Pico della Mirandola, and wrote two pamphlets for him.

Another important student of del Medigo's at that time was Domenico Grimani, a Venetian, who eventually became the Cardinal of San Marco. Grimani proved to be a consistent patron, and with his encouragement, del Medigo wrote several manuscripts which received wide distribution among Italian philosophers.

He stayed in close contact with Pico della Mirandola, traveling to Florence, the site of Marsilio Ficino's Platonic Academy, to give classes and to translate manuscripts from Hebrew to Latin for Pico.

In the end, however, Del Medigo was no Kabbalist, and he became disenchanted with the syncretic direction Pico and his colleagues were moving in, a tendency to combine concepts of magic, Hermeticism and Kabbalah with Plato and Neoplatonism.

In addition to his increasing disappointment with Pico, he was somewhat discredited himself by the backlash from Pico's imprisonment and the interdiction by the Vatican of his 900 Theses. Furthermore, tension arose between del Medigo and the Italian Jewish community over his secular intellectual interests and his associations with gentile scholars. As a consequence of the financial difficulties he experienced in the wake of Pico's disfavor, del Medigo decided to leave Italy for good. He went back to Crete, where he spent the last years of his life. During this period, del Medigo returned to Jewish thought, writing the Sefer Bechinat Ha-dath for his students, in which he clarified his disagreement with the magical and Kabbalistic theories that inspired Pico's Oration on the Dignity of Man, and expounded his belief that a human being cannot aspire to become a god, and that Judaism requires that a man must "fight for rationality, sobriety and the realization of [his] human limitations."

Delmedigo argued against the antiquity of the Kabbalah, noting that it was not known to the sages of the Talmud, or to the geonim, or to Rashi. He also denies that Rabbi Shimon bar Yochai was the author of the Zohar, since that work mentions people who lived after the death of Rabbi Shimon bar Yochai. In addition, he attacks the esoteric allegorists among Jewish philosophers. In another section of his work Delmedigo discusses the intellectual reasoning underlying the commandments of Torah (ta'amei ha-mitzvot).

His descendant Joseph Solomon Delmedigo was a famous rabbi, philosopher and a staunch defender of the Kabbalah.

== Popular culture ==
Elia del Medigo is likely the inspiration for the fictional character Judah del Medigo, in "The Secret Book of Grazia dei Rossi" by Jacqueline Park.

== See also ==
- Greek scholars in the Renaissance

== Notes ==
1. Stanford Encyclopedia of Philosophy article on del Medigo -- http://plato.stanford.edu/entries/delmedigo/ downloaded 1/17/2006.
