= Friedrich Heinrich Hugo Windischmann =

German orientalist (1811–1861)

Canon Friedrich Heinrich Hugo Windischmann
- Church: Catholic Church
- Opposed to: State encroachment on papal and ecclesiastical rights
- Other posts: Vicar of Freising Cathedral; Professor-extraordinary of canon law and New Testament exegesis at Freising; Vicar general of Munich

Orders
- Ordination: 13 March 1837

Personal details
- Born: 13 December 1811 Aschaffenburg, Grand Duchy of Frankfurt
- Died: 23 August 1861 (aged 49) Munich, Kingdom of Bavaria
- Parents: Karl Joseph Hieronymus Windischmann (father)
- Education: University of Bonn (PhD, 1832); Ludwig-Maximilians-Universität München (ThD, 1836)

Friedrich Heinrich Hugo Windischmann (13 December 1811 – 23 August 1861 in Munich) was a German orientalist, exegete and Catholic priest.

== Biography ==
Son of the philosopher Karl Joseph Hieronymus Windischmann, he studied philosophy, classical philology, and Sanskrit at the University of Bonn, theology at the University of Bonn and the Ludwig-Maximilians-Universität München, and Armenian with the Mekhitarists in Venice. After receiving a doctorate in theology at the Ludwig-Maximilians-Universität München on 2 January 1836, he was ordained as a priest on the following 13 March; seven months later he became vicar of the cathedral and secretary of Archbishop Gebsattel of Munich. In 1838, he was professor-extraordinary of canon law and New Testament exegesis at Freising, but resigned when appointed canon of the cathedral in 1839.

In 1842, he was chosen a member of the Royal Bavarian Academy of Sciences and in 1846 became Vicar-General of Munich. He accompanied Archbishop Reisach to the episcopal conference at Würzburg in 1848, and was with him in Rome when the dogma of the Immaculate Conception was defined in 1854. When Reisach was created cardinal and took up his residence in Rome, Windischmann became a simple Canon on 27 August 1856. His defence of the papal and ecclesiastical rights against the frequent encroachments of the State often brought him in conflict with the civil authorities.

Windischmann was very well-versed in the Armenian and Old Persian languages, and in the various Sanskrit dialects.

== Published works ==
- Sancta Sacra de Theologumenis Vedanticorum (Bonn, 1833)
- Sancara sive de theologumenis Vedanticorum (Bonn, 1839)
- Erklärung des Briefes an die Galater (1843)
- Ueber den Somacultus der Arier in Abhandlungen der münchener Akademie (1846)
- Ursagen der arischen Völker (Origins of the Aryan Races; ib., 1853)
- Die persische Anahita oder Anaitis (ib., 1856)
- "Mithra" in Abhandlungen fur die Kunde des Morgenlandes (1857)
- a posthumous work, Zoroastrische Studien (Munich, 1863)
- Vindiciae petrinae (Ratisborn, 1863), a defence of the Epistles of St. Peter and his coming to Rome, directed against Baur and his school
- Erklärung des Briefes an die Galater (Mainz, 1843), an explanation of St. Paul's Letter to the Galatians
- Zarathushtra in the Gathas, and in the Greek and Roman classics (1897) with Wilhelm Geiger and Dārāb dastur Peshotan Sanjānā
- Zoroastrische studien; abhandlungen zur mythologie und sagengeschichte des alten Iran (1863) with Fr. Spiegel
