= Rudolf Geiger =

German meteorologist and climatologist (1894–1981)

- Born: Rudolf Oskar Robert Williams Geiger; 24 August 1894; Erlangen, German Empire
- Died: 22 January 1981 (aged 86); Munich, West Germany
- Known for: Köppen–Geiger climate classification
- Relatives: ∞ 1919 Irmgard Helene Elisabeth Klippel; 5 children
- Scientific career
- Fields: Meteorology

Rudolf Oskar Robert Williams Geiger (/ˈɡaɪɡər/; German: [ˈɡaɪɡɐ]; 24 August 1894 – 22 January 1981) was a German officer, meteorologist and climatologist. He was the son of Indologist Wilhelm Geiger and the brother of physicist Hans Geiger.

== Life ==
Prof. Dr. phil. Dr. rer. nat. h. c. Geiger was among those scientists whose insights add to the body of knowledge and invigorate research. Through systematic investigations, he laid the foundations for "micrometeorology," "microclimatology," and, in particular, "forest meteorology." His 180 publications—as well as his lectures and talks—were characterized by their clarity, richness of content, and vitality. The name Rudolf Geiger remains linked to seminal works such as Das Klima der bodennahen Luftschicht (The Climate of the Air Layer Near the Ground) and Mikroklima und Pflanzenklima (Microclimate and Plant Climate), as well as the wall maps Klimate der Erde (Climates of the Earth) and Atmosphäre der Erde (Atmosphere of the Earth), and the transparency series Klima der Kontinente (Climate of the Continents) within the Perthes Transparent Atlas.

His correlation of meteorological phenomena with the processes and effects observed across all biological and technical domains also fostered the development of "applied climatology" and "environmental research." In 1948, he succeeded Prof. August Schmauß as Full Professor of Meteorology at the Ludwig-Maximilians-Universität München. In this capacity, he also directed the Institute for Forest Meteorology at the Ludwig-Maximilians-Universität München. He worked with Wladimir Köppen on climatology, hence the Köppen–Geiger climate classification. Following his retirement in 1959, the scholar spent his twilight years in his large home in Munich-Pasing, together with his wife, with whom he had shared his life for over sixty years.

== Memberships (excerpt) ==
- 1933 Reichsbund der Deutschen Beamten
  - member of the Fachschaft or Administrative Department 11 (Forestry Administration) from October 1933 to 31 May 1938
- 1938 National Socialist Teachers League
  - member from 1 June 1938 to February 1943
- 27 March 1940 Full Member of the Hermann Göring Academy of German Forestry Science
- 1952 Full Member of the Bavarian Academy of Sciences
  - 1958–1961 Class Secretary
  - 1958–1959 Vice President
  - 1963–1965 Secretary of the Commission for Glaciology
- 1955 Member of the German Academy of Natural Scientists Leopoldina

=== Honors ===
- 1964 Honorary Member of the Meteorological Society of Japan
- 1964 Honorary Member of the Meteorological Society of Munich
- 1966 Honorary Member of the Association of German Meteorological Societies

== Promotions and appointments ==
- 11 January 1915 Kriegsfreiwilliger (War Volunteer)
- 10 November 1915 Unteroffizier (NCO/Corporal/Junior Sergeant)
- 30 July 1916 Vizewachtmeister (Vice Sergeant/Vice Staff Sergeant)
- 11 June 1917 Fähnrich (Officer Cadet) and Leutnant (2nd Lieutenant) without Patent (simultaneously)
  - 26 October 1917 received Patent as Leutnant from 18 June 1915
- 13 January 1919 Leutnant der Reserve (2nd Lieutenant of the Reserves)
- 31 August 1922 Charakter als Oberleutnant der Reserves a. D. (Honorary 1st Lieutenant of the Reserves, Retired)
- 1939 Oberleutnant zur Verfügung der Luftwaffe (1st Lieutenant at the disposal of the Luftwaffe)
- 19 August 1941 Oberregierungsrat der Reserve (Senior Government Councilor of the Reserves)
  - 19 August 1941 appointed head of the Meteorological Experimental Group of the Naval Weather Service (Training of Kriegsmarine Meteorologists)
  - 18 January 1945 Transferred to the OKH / Army General Staff, Foreign Armies East Department under Reinhard Gehlen
    - A "special assignment" (presumably of a meteorological nature) within Group I—the "Leadership Group"—specifically in Sub-group Ia under Gerhard Wessel; the Ia section was responsible, within the department, for compiling the organization's own situational assessments. Furthermore, the Ia section monitored developments in other theaters of war in order to, where appropriate, utilize critical information from other parts of the world for the benefit of the FHO, or to alert other FHO personnel to significant events.

== Awards, decorations and honors ==
- Iron Cross (1914), 2nd Class on 24 March 1916
- Military Merit Order (Bavaria), 4th Class with Swords (BMV4X/BM4X) on 18 October 1917
- Wound Badge (1918) in Black on 10 July 1918
- Honour Cross of the World War 1914/1918 (1934) with Swords on 7 January 1935
- Civil Service Faithful Service Medal, 2nd Grade in Silver for 25 years on 20 August 1938
- War Merit Cross (1939), 2nd and 1st Class with Swords
  - 2nd Class on 20 April 1943
  - 1st Class on 1 September 1944
- Bavarian Order of Merit in 1959
- Peter Lenné Gold Medal of the Johann Wolfgang von Goethe Foundation, Basel in 1977

=== Honors (excerpt) ===
- 8 September 1937 Secretary of the Commission for Agricultural Meteorology of the International Meteorological Organization
- 1964 Festschrift (commemorative volume) by his students on the occasion of his 70th birthday
- 1968 Honorary Doctorate (Dr. rer. nat. h. c.) from the Faculty of Natural Sciences at the University of Hohenheim

== Sources ==
- German Federal Archives: BArch RH 7/959 and R 4901/13263
- Prof. Dr. Rudolf Geiger zum 70. Geburtstag. Festschrift herausgegeben von seinen Schülern. Universität München – Meteorologisches Institut. Wissenschaftliche Mitteilungen Nr. 9, 1964 (with image).
- Baumgartner, Albert/ Nachruf – Prof. Dr. Dr. h. c. Rudolf Geiger. In: Mitteilungen der Deutschen Meteorologischen Gesellschaft Jg. 33, 1981, H. 1, S. 21–24.
