= Guyger =

Guyger is a surname. Notable people with the name include:

- Amber Guyger (born 1988), American police officer convicted in the murder of Botham Jean
- Steve Guyger (born 1952) American blues harmonica player, singer, and songwriter

== See also ==
- Geiger (surname)
- Giger
