= Hermann Geiger =

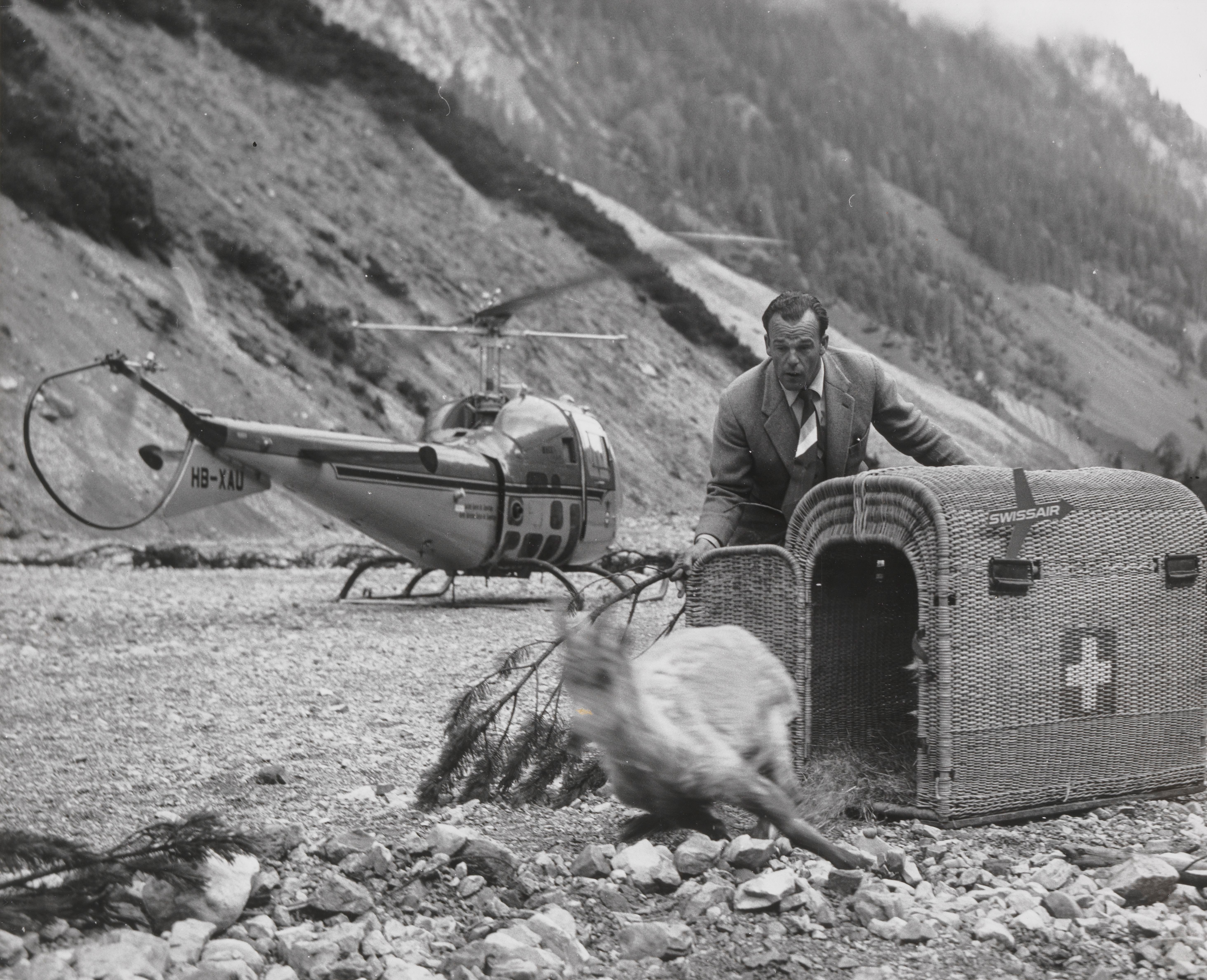
Herman Geiger

Hermann Geiger (27 October 1914 - 26 August 1966) was a Swiss aviator and search and rescue pilot whose heroic actions gave him national hero status in Switzerland. Known as "The Glacier Pilot," he pioneered the art of landing his Piper PA-18 on glaciers in the Swiss Alps like no other. In over 600 rescue missions, he managed to land his specially modified aircraft under extreme conditions on snow-covered glaciers. He often had to carry the injured people by himself in subzero temperatures and blizzard conditions to get them safely aboard his plane. Geiger once said, "To save lives, you must risk your own". He died from injuries suffered in a fatal collision with a glider at the age of 52. In aviation history, Geiger is the first man to successfully land on a glacier and one of the first mountain rescuers.

== Biography ==
Geigers was from Sion in Valais, Switzerland, the son of a farmer. His love of flying began at the age of ten when he went to an aviation club for the first time. He began working as a mechanic when he was fifteen at a garage. He built his own glider and took gliding lessons as a young man. In 1940, he trained to become a police officer, giving flying lessons in his spare time.

He was the first man to land his plane on Kanderfirm, a 7,800-foot glacier in Switzerland. He modified his Piper plane with retractable metal skies, enabling him, after much practice, to land on glaciers and mountains where most would not dare. On 16 July 1953, he also successfully landed on the summit of Monte Rosa glacier.

Geiger was known as the Eagle from Sion or King of Mountain Pilots. He wrote a book: Alpine Pilot first published in 1956 and translated into English by Alan Tuppen. It is a concise and interesting personal account of his achievement and joy of flying and has a real place in Alpine history alongside all the best.

Hermann Geiger was a world-renowned Gletscherpilot and one of the founders of the Swiss Air Rescue (Rega). He was the inventor of a landing technique for snow slopes to rescue climbers in distress. He led more than 600 daring rescues with his single-engine Piper PA-18 through the high mountains.

In 1958, he played himself in a semi-documentary Swiss feature film called SOS Glacier Pilot in 1959.

Geiger was also a member of the Segelfluggruppe Winterthur.

On 26 August 1966, he was flying with a student at the Sion airport when they collided with a glider. Geiger died from injuries as a result of the accident. A few days later, many people attended his funeral.
