= Hans Geiger =

German physicist (1882–1945)

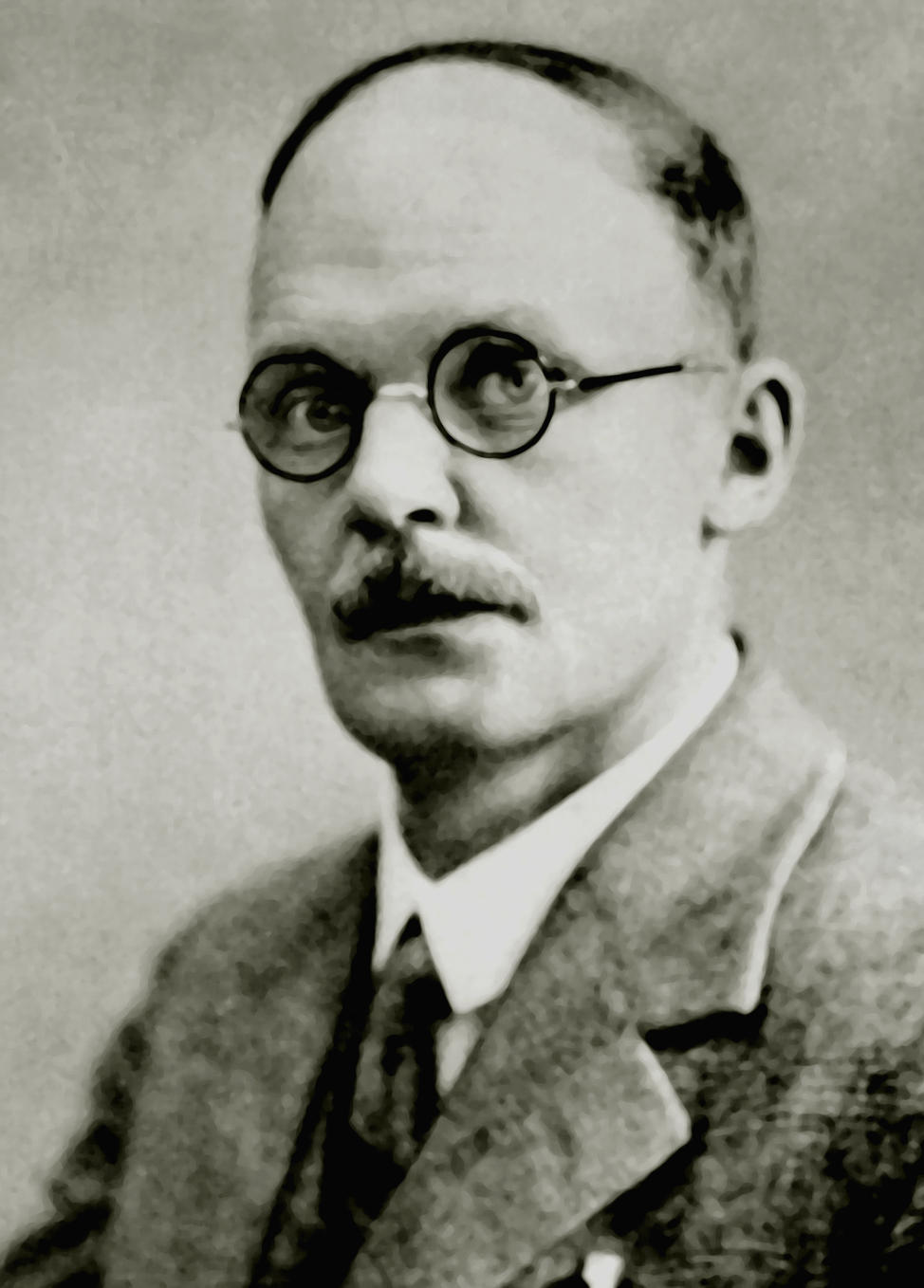
- Geiger in 1928
- Born: Johannes Wilhelm Geiger; 30 September 1882; Neustadt an der Haardt, German Empire
- Died: 24 September 1945 (aged 62); Potsdam, Germany
- Education: LMU Munich; University of Erlangen (PhD)
- Known for: Geiger counter; Geiger–Nuttall law; Geiger–Marsden experiment; Bothe–Geiger coincidence experiment
- Father: Wilhelm Geiger
- Relatives: Rudolf Geiger (brother)
- Awards: Hughes Medal (1929); Duddell Medal and Prize (1937)
- Scientific career
- Fields: Physics
- Workplaces: Victoria University of Manchester; Physikalisch-Technische Reichsanstalt; University of Kiel; University of Tübingen; Technische Hochschule Berlin
- Thesis: Strahlungs-, Temperatur- und Potentialmessungen in Entladungsröhren bei starken Strömen (1907)
- Doctoral advisor: Eilhard Wiedemann
- Doctoral students: Otto Haxel; Walther Müller; Ernst Stuhlinger; Helmut Volz

Johannes "Hans" Wilhelm Geiger (Note: /ˈɡaɪɡər, ˈɡaɪɡə/ GYE-ger, GYE-guh; German: [ˈɡaɪɡɐ]) (30 September 1882 – 24 September 1945) was a German experimental physicist. He is known as the inventor of the Geiger counter, a device used to detect ionizing radiation, and for carrying out the Rutherford scattering experiments, which led to the discovery of the atomic nucleus. He also performed the Bothe–Geiger coincidence experiment, which confirmed the conservation of energy in light-particle interactions.

He was the brother of meteorologist and climatologist Rudolf Geiger.

== Biography ==
=== Early years ===
Johannes Wilhelm Geiger was born on 30 September 1882 in Neustadt an der Haardt (now Neustadt an der Weinstraße), Kingdom of Bavaria, German Empire, the eldest of five children of Indologist Wilhelm Geiger. Geiger studied physics at LMU Munich and the University of Erlangen (now the University of Erlangen–Nuremberg). In 1906, he received a Doctor of Philosophy from Erlangen for a thesis on electric discharges through gases, supervised by Eilhard Wiedemann.

After graduating, Geiger received a fellowship to the Victoria University of Manchester, where he worked as an assistant to Arthur Schuster. In 1907, after Schuster's retirement, Geiger began to work with his successor, Ernest Rutherford, and in 1908, along with Ernest Marsden, conducted the famous Geiger–Marsden experiment (also known as the "gold foil experiment"). This process allowed them to count alpha particles and led Rutherford to start thinking about the structure of the atom. He was elected a Member of the Manchester Literary and Philosophical Society on 29 November 1910.

In 1911, Geiger and John Mitchell Nuttall discovered the Geiger–Nuttall law (or rule) and performed experiments that led to Rutherford's atomic model.

=== Middle years ===
In 1912, Geiger was named head of radiation research at the Physikalisch-Technische Reichsanstalt (now the Physikalisch-Technische Bundesanstalt) in Charlottenburg, where he worked with James Chadwick and Walther Bothe (winners of the 1935 and 1954 Nobel Prize in Physics, respectively). Work was interrupted when Geiger served in the German military during World War I as an artillery officer from 1914 to 1918.

In 1924, Geiger and Bothe carried out the Bothe–Geiger coincidence experiment that confirmed the Compton effect, which helped earn Arthur Compton the 1927 Nobel Prize in Physics. Bothe received the Nobel Prize in Physics for their experiment in 1954, after Geiger's death.

In 1925, Geiger began a teaching position at Kiel University. In 1928, Geiger and his student, Walther Müller, created the Geiger–Müller tube. This new device not only detected alpha particles, but also beta and gamma particles, and is the basis for the Geiger counter.

In 1929, Geiger was appointed Professor of Physics and Director of Research at the University of Tübingen, where he made his first observations of a cosmic ray shower. In 1936, he took a position at Technische Hochschule Berlin (now Technische Universität Berlin), where he continued to research cosmic rays, nuclear fission, and artificial radiation until his death in 1945.

=== Later years ===
Beginning in 1939, following the discovery of nuclear fission, Geiger became a member of the Uranium Club, the German investigation of nuclear weapons during World War II. The group splintered in 1942 after its members came to believe that nuclear weapons would not play a significant role in ending the war.

Although Geiger signed a petition against the Nazi government's interference with universities, he provided no support to colleague Hans Bethe (winner of the 1967 Nobel Prize in Physics) when he was fired for being Jewish.

In June 1945, following Germany's defeat in May, Geiger fled the Soviet occupation of Berlin and took up refuge in nearby Potsdam, where he died on 24 September of that year at the age of 62.

== Awards ==
Year	Organization	Award	Citation	Ref.
1929	Royal Society	Hughes Medal	"For his invention and development of methods of counting alpha and beta particles."	
1937	Institute of Physics	Duddell Medal and Prize	—	

== See also ==
- Geiger (crater)
