= Tierarzt Dr. Engel =

- Starring: Wolfgang Fierek
- Country of origin: Germany

Tierarzt Dr. Engel is a German television series.

== See also ==
- List of German television series
