= Michael Geiger (American football) =

American football player (born 1994)

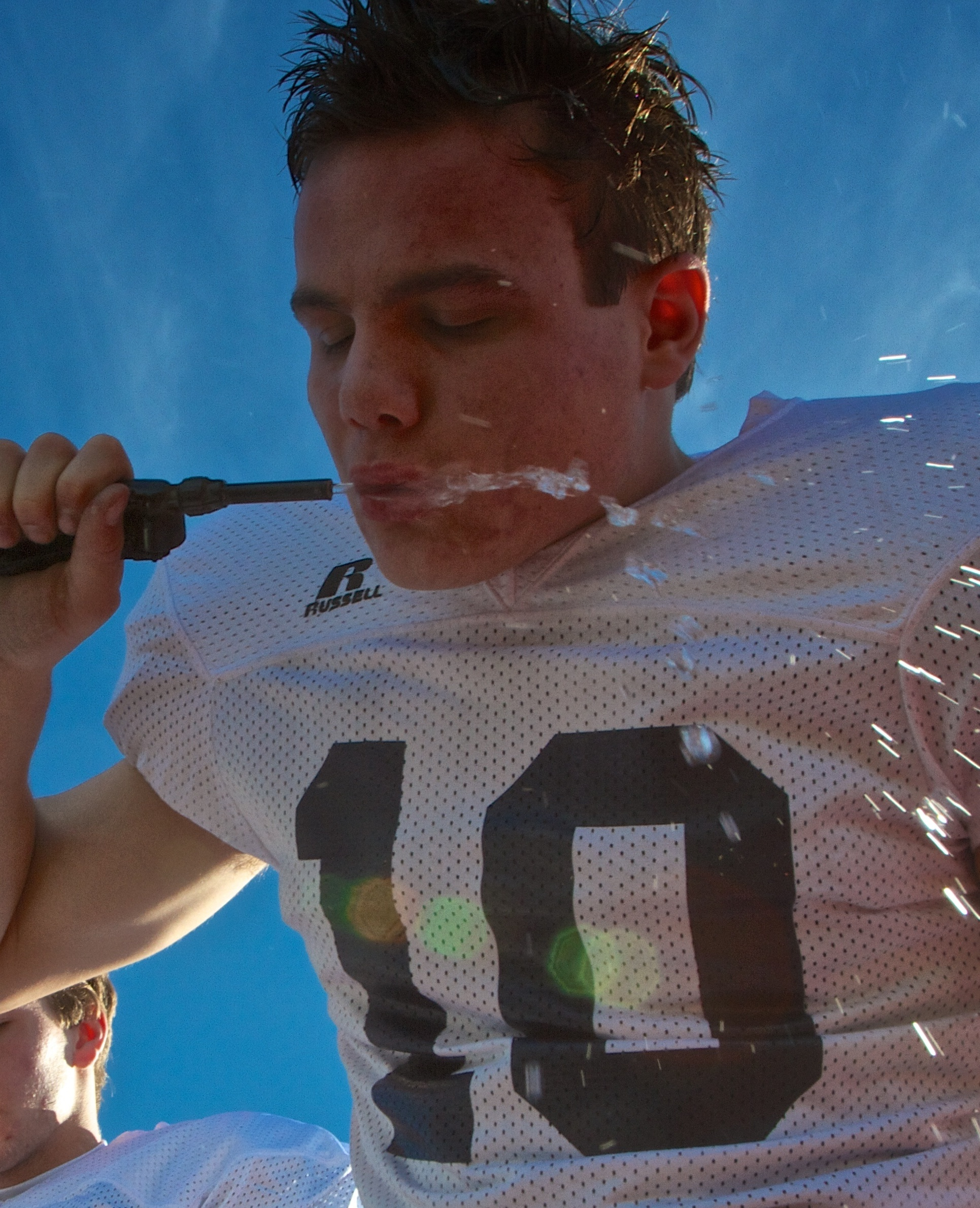
- Geiger in 2012

No. 4
- Position: Placekicker

Personal information
- Born: October 4, 1994 (age 32); Toledo, Ohio, U.S.
- Listed height: 5 ft 9 in (1.75 m)
- Listed weight: 185 lb (84 kg)

Career information
- High school: Ottawa Hills (Ottawa Hills, Ohio)
- College: Michigan State (2013–2016)
- Stats at ESPN

Michael Geiger (/ˈɡaɪɡər/ GEI-gər; (born October 4, 1994) is an American former college football player who was a placekicker for the Michigan State Spartans from 2013 to 2016.

== Early life ==
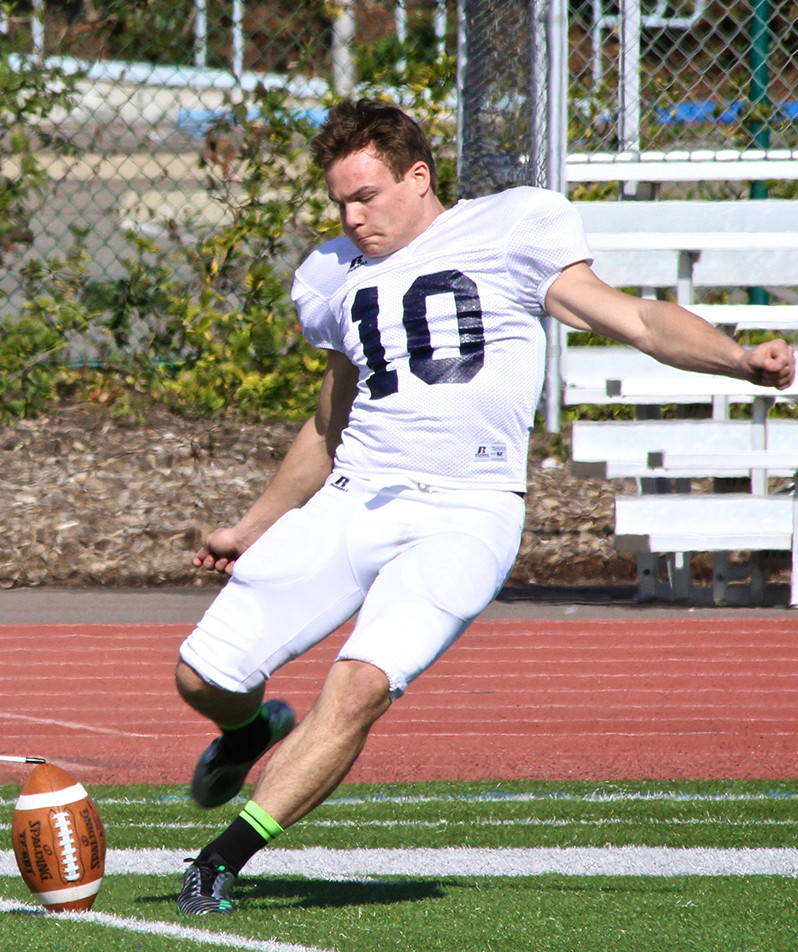
Geiger in 2012

Geiger was born in Toledo, Ohio, and grew up there. Geiger attended Ottawa Hills High School in Ottawa Hills, Ohio, where he played American football. Geiger was ranked the No. 1 high school placekicker by Chris Sailer Kicking.

== College career ==
Geiger attended Michigan State University from 2013 to 2016.

In 2013, for his freshman season, Geiger made 15 of 16 field goal attempts (93.8%) and made 36 of 38 extra point attempts (94.7%).

In 2014, for his sophomore season, Geiger made 14 of 22 field goal attempts (63.6%) and made 72 of 72 extra point attempts (100%), a Michigan State record.

In 2015, for his junior season, Geiger made 12 of 19 field goal attempts (63.2%) and made 51 of 53 extra point attempts (96.2%).

In 2016, for his senior season, Geiger made 15 of 19 field goal attempts (78.9%) and made 30 of 30 extra point attempts (100%).

He finished his career making 56 of his 76 field goal attempts (73.7%), and went 189 of 193 on extra point attempts (97.9%) which combined for 357 points.

=== College statistics ===
Legend
**Bold**	Career high

Year	Team	Kicking							
Year	Team	FGM	FGA	FG%	Long	XPM	XPA	XP%	PTS
2013	Michigan State	**15**	16	**93.8%**	49	36	38	94.7%	81
2014	Michigan State	14	**22**	63.6%	42	**72**	**72**	**100%**	**114**
2015	Michigan State	12	19	63.2%	47	51	53	96.2%	87
2016	Michigan State	**15**	19	78.9%	**52**	30	30	**100%**	75
Career		56	76	73.7%	52	189	193	97.9%	357
