= Göttingen Eighteen =

Group of humans

The Göttingen Eighteen (German: Göttinger Achtzehn) was a group of eighteen leading nuclear researchers of the newly founded Federal Republic of Germany who wrote the Göttingen Manifesto on 12 April 1957, opposing Chancellor Konrad Adenauer and Defense Secretary Franz-Josef Strauß's move to arm the West German army, the Bundeswehr, with tactical nuclear weapons.

The eighteen atomic scientists were: Fritz Bopp, Max Born, Rudolf Fleischmann, Walther Gerlach, Otto Hahn, Otto Haxel, Werner Heisenberg, Hans Kopfermann, Max von Laue, Heinz Maier-Leibnitz, Josef Mattauch, Friedrich Adolf Paneth, Wolfgang Paul, Wolfgang Riezler, Fritz Straßmann, Wilhelm Walcher, Carl Friedrich von Weizsäcker and Karl Wirtz.

These eighteen people were leading researchers and members of public institutions for research on nuclear energy and technology in West Germany in that time.

The group's name was chosen because many of the signatories were connected with the university town of Göttingen, and as a reference to the 19th century Göttingen Seven.

== See also ==
- Multilateral Force
