= Heinz Maier-Leibnitz =

German physicist (1911–2000)

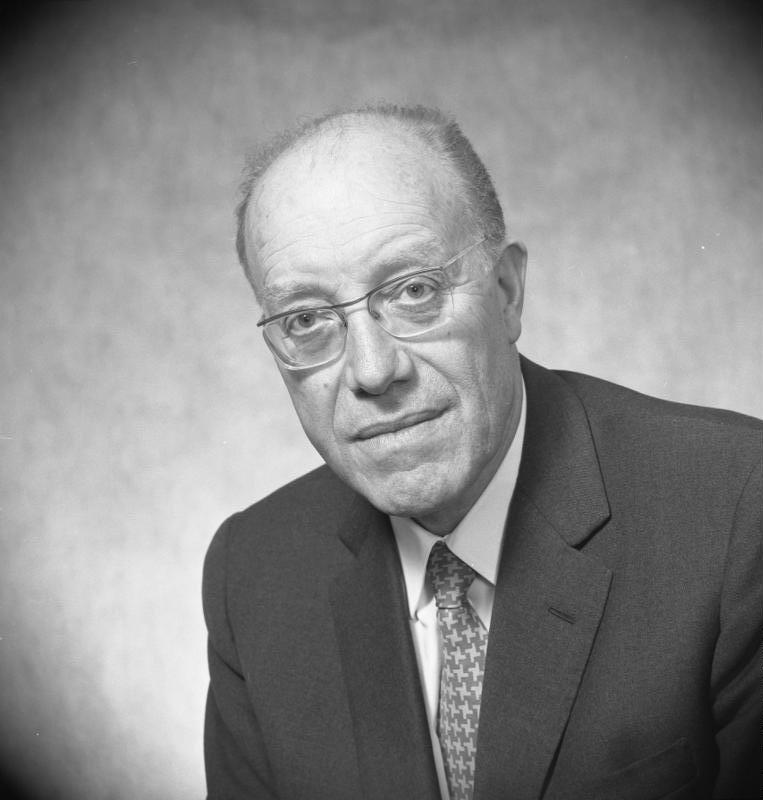
- Heinz Maier-Leibnitz (1974).
- Born: Heinz Maier-Leibnitz; 28 March 1911; Esslingen am Neckar, Germany
- Died: 16 December 2000 (aged 89); Allensbach, Germany
- Education: University of Stuttgart; University of Göttingen
- Known for: Neutron backscattering Nuclear spectroscopy
- Awards: Stern–Gerlach Medal (1996); Otto Hahn Prize (1986); Wilhelm Exner Medal (1985); Pour le Mérite for Sciences and Arts (1976)
- Scientific career
- Fields: Atomic physics
- Institutions: Technical University of Munich; Institut Laue–Langevin
- Doctoral advisor: James Franck; Georg Joos
- Doctoral students: Rudolf Mössbauer

Heinz Maier-Leibnitz (28 March 1911, in Esslingen am Neckar – 16 December 2000, in Allensbach) was a German physicist. He made contributions to nuclear spectroscopy, coincidence measurement techniques, radioactive tracers for biochemistry and medicine, and neutron optics. He was an influential educator and an advisor to the Federal Republic of Germany on nuclear programs.

During World War II, Maier-Leibnitz worked at the Institute of Physics of the Kaiser Wilhelm Institute for Medical Research, in Heidelberg. After the war, he spent a year working in North America, after which he returned to the Institute of Physics. In 1952, he assumed the Chair for Technical Physics and directorship of the Laboratory for Technical Physics at the Technische Hochschule München. He became a leader in establishing and building centers which used nuclear reactors as neutron sources for research. The first was the Research Reactor Munich, which was the seed for the entire Garching research campus of the Technische Hochschule München. The second was the German-French project to construct a high-flux neutron source and found the Institut Laue–Langevin in Grenoble, France; he was also its first director. His leadership also helped establish the Physics Department at the Technische Hochschule München. Maier-Leibnitz was the chairman of a special committee for designing the German Nuclear Program, and thus he was the architect of the first full-scale nuclear program of the Federal Republic of Germany. He was a signatory of the Göttingen Manifest.

In his honor, the German Research Foundation annually awards six scientists with the Heinz Maier-Leibnitz-Preis. The research reactor Forschungsreaktor München II is officially named Forschungsneutronenquelle Heinz Maier-Leibnitz.

== Education ==
Maier-Leibnitz studied physics at the University of Stuttgart and the University of Göttingen. He received his doctorate in 1935, from the University of Göttingen, under the Nobel Laureate James Franck and Georg Joos – Franck had emigrated from Germany in 1933 and his successor was Joos. Maier-Leibnitz was in the field of atomic physics, and he discovered metastable, negative helium ions, which later had applications in particle accelerators.

== Career ==
Shortly after receipt of his doctorate in 1935, Maier-Leibnitz became an assistant to Walther Bothe, Director of the Institut für Physik (Institute for Physics) of the Kaiser-Wilhelm Institut für medizinische Forschung (KWImF, Kaiser Wilhelm Institute for Medical Research), in Heidelberg. [Note: After World War II, the KWImF was renamed the Max-Planck Institut für medizinische Forschung. In 1958, Bothe's Institut für Physik was spun off and elevated to become the Max-Planck-Institut für Kernphysik (MPIK, Max Planck Institute for Nuclear Physics).] Bothe had first met Maier-Leibnitz while on a recruiting trip to the University of Göttingen during which Robert Pohl and Georg Joos highly recommended Maier-Leibnitz for his intelligence and creativity. Maier-Leibnitz arrived at the Institute for Physics shortly after the arrival of Wolfgang Gentner, who became recognized as Bothe's second in command and took Maier-Leibnitz under his wing to become his mentor, critic, and a close friend. Maier-Leibnitz worked on nuclear spectroscopy, electron-gamma-ray coincidence measurements, radioactive tracers, and energy conservation in Compton scattering.

In the early years of World War II, Maier-Leibnitz first served in the German air defense and then as a meteorologist at air bases in France. In 1942, he was recalled from the Eastern front and returned to continue his work with Bothe, who, since 1939, had been a principal in the German nuclear energy project, also known as the Uranverein (Uranium Club).

After World War II, due to the ravages of war and the Allied occupation policies, Bothe's Institute for Physics fell on hard times. Maier-Leibnitz, Kurt Starke, and other younger colleagues of Bothe left for employment in North America. Maier-Leibnitz left in the spring of 1947. When his contract expired in the spring of 1948, he returned to again work for Bothe. Maier-Leibnitz continued to work on nuclear spectroscopy and radioactive tracers in biochemistry and medicine. He also took up the study of positron annihilation in solids, which became a new tool for measuring the momentum distribution of bound electrons.

In 1952, upon the retirement of Walther Meissner, Maier-Leibnitz assumed the Lehrstuhl für Technische Physik (Chair for Technical Physics) and directorship of the Laboratorium für technische Physik (Laboratory for Technical Physics) at the Technische Hochschule München (in 1970 renamed the Technical University of Munich). This became the nucleus of the Maier-Leibnitz school for nuclear solid state physics. The far-sightedness of Maier-Leibnitz led to reorganization and expansion of physics at the Technische Hochschule München and the formation of the Physics Department in 1965. One of his first major expansions was done with the appointment of Nikolaus Riehl, who had returned to Germany in 1955, after having been taken to the Soviet Union in 1945 to work on the Soviet atomic bomb project. Riehl was an authority on the purification of uranium, and he greatly contributed to bringing about the construction of a new research tool at the Technische Hochschule München. Through the initiative and leadership of Maier-Leibnitz, the Forschungsreaktor München (FRM, Research Reactor Munich) was built in Garching bei München; it was the first nuclear reactor built in Germany. This reactor, popularly called the Atomei (atomic egg), based on its characteristic shape, was built in 1956 and became operational in 1957. Rather than being used to study reactor physics and technology, the swimming-pool-type reactor was used as a neutron source, and it became a versatile tool for interdisciplinary research. Furthermore, it was the seed for the entire Garching research campus. A second reactor built nearby, Forschungsreaktor München II (FRM II, Research Reactor Munich II), went critical for the first time four years after the death of Maier-Leibnitz; it was named the Forschungsneutronenquelle Heinz Maier-Leibnitz in his honor.

During 1956 and 1957, Maier-Leibnitz was a member of the Arbeitskreis Kernphysik (Nuclear Physics Working Group) of the Fachkommission II „Forschung und Nachwuchs“ (Commission II “Research and Growth”) of the Deutschen Atomkommission (DAtK, German Atomic Energy Commission). Other members of the Nuclear Physics Working Group in both 1956 and 1957 were: Werner Heisenberg (chairman), Hans Kopfermann (vice-chairman), Fritz Bopp, Walther Bothe, Wolfgang Gentner, Otto Haxel, Willibald Jentschke, Josef Mattauch, Wolfgang Riezler, Wilhelm Walcher and Carl Friedrich von Weizsäcker. Wolfgang Paul was also a member of the group during 1957.

Maier-Leibnitz was also a member of the Arbeitskreis Kernreaktoren (Nuclear Reactor Working Group) of the DAtK, and it was considered to be the most active and influential board of the DAtK. Some of the other members of the group were Erich Bagge, Wolfgang Finkelnburg, and Karl Wirtz. For the first decade of nuclear energy development in the Federal Republic of Germany (FRG), it was the center of decision making, and it had representative membership from German industry. Maier-Leibnitz was also the chairman of a special committee for designing the Deutsches Atomprogramm (German Nuclear Program). From this position, he became the architect of the first full-scale nuclear program of the FRG.

In 1961, became an ordentlicher Professor (professor ordinarius) of technical physics at the Technische Hochschule München. Also in 1961, Rudolf L. Mößbauer, a former student of Maier-Leibnitz at Technische Hochschule München, received the Nobel Prize in Physics for his discovery of recoil-free emission and absorption of gamma radiation in solids known as the Mößbauer Effect, which led to numerous applications in solid state physics, chemistry, biophysics, medicine and archeology. Maier-Leibnitz, along with his colleagues Wilhelm Brenig, Nikolaus Riehl and Wolfgang Wild, in a memorandum in 1962, proposed the establishment of a Physics Department at the Technische Hochschule München. This was used as bargaining tool to bring Mößbauer from the California Institute of Technology in Pasadena back to the Technische Hochschule München in 1964. The Physics Department was founded on 1 January 1965, replacing the three former independent institutes, but now with ten full professors, one of which was Maier-Leibnitz; the three institutes replaced were the Physikalisches Institut, the 'Laboratorium für technische Physik, and the Institut für Theoretische Physik.

Through his experience and expertise in instrumental techniques, particularly neutron optics, Maier-Leibnitz was one of the first to realize that the neutron flux from the FRM was too low for some interesting experiments. Maier-Leibnitz was instrumental, along with Louis Néel, in bringing about the German-French project to construct a high-flux neutron source and founded the Institut Laue-Langevin in Grenoble in 1967, named in honor of the physicist Max von Laue and Paul Langevin. The reactor had the first source of cold neutrons. From 1967 to 1972, Maier-Leibnitz was the first director of the Institut Laue-Langevin.

After the end of his term as director of the Institut Laue-Langevin, Maier-Leibnitz held other positions, including:

- 1972 – 1973: Member of the Wissenschaftsrat (German Council of Science and Humanities)
- 1972 – 1975: President of the International Union of Pure and Applied Physics
- 1973 – 1974: Chairman of the Gesellschaft Deutscher Naturforscher und Ärzte (Association of German Natural Scientists and Physicians)
- 1973 – 1983: Founding Council of the Carl-Friedrich-von-Siemens Foundation
- 1974 – 1979: President of the Deutsche Forschungsgemeinschaft (DFG, German Research Foundation)

After 27 years of service at the Technical University of Munich (formerly the Technische Hochschule München), Maier-Leibnitz achieved emeritus status in 1979.

Maier-Leibnitz was a member of the German Academy of Sciences Leopoldina, various academies of sciences and humanities (Heidelberg, Bavaria, Flanders, India, Sweden, Finland, France and Austria), of the Royal Swedish Academy of Sciences. He was co-editor of several journals, among them Nukleonik.

Since 1979, the Heinz Maier-Leibnitz-Preis (Heinz Maier-Leibnitz Prize) has been annually given in his honor. The prize is funded by the Bundesministerium für Bildung und Forschung (BMBF, German Ministry of Education and Research), and it is awarded by a selection committee appointed by the Deutsche Forschungsgemeinschaft (DFG, German Research Foundation) and the BMBF.

Maier-Leibnitz was a signatory of the manifesto of the Göttinger Achtzehn (Göttingen Eighteen).

Maier-Leibnitz was interested in cooking as a hobby, and he was the author of the cookbook Kochbuch für Füchse.

== Honors ==
Maier-Leibnitz was awarded a number of honors, including:

- 1965 – Honorary doctorate from the University of Vienna
- 1966 – Honorary doctorate from the University of Grenoble
- 1996 – Stern-Gerlach-Medaille of the Deutsche Physikalische Gesellschaft.
- 1971 – Carus Medal of the German Academy of Sciences Leopoldina
- 1972 – Grand Cross of the Order of Merit of the Federal Republic of Germany
- 1973 – Honorary doctorate from the University of Reading.
- 1973 – Austrian Decoration for Science and Art
- 1979–1984 – Member and later Chancellor of the Pour le Mérite for Science and Art
- 1980 – Freiherr vom Stein Prize.
- 1981 – Bavarian Maximilian Order for Science and Art
- 1984 – Otto Hahn Prize of the City of Frankfurt am Main
- 1985 – Wilhelm Exner Medal.
- 1986 – Otto Hahn Prize for Chemistry and Physics of the German Chemical Society and the German Physical Society
- 1988 – Lorenz Oken Medal.
- 1991 – Grand Cross of Merit with Star and Sash of the Federal Republic of Germany
- 1995 – Order of Merit of Baden-Württemberg
- 2000 – Golden Ring of Honor of the Technical University of Munich

== Notable Articles by Maier-Leibnitz ==
- Heinz Maier-Leibnitz: Ausbeutemessungen beim Stoß langsamer Elektronen mit Edelgasatomen, Zeitschrift für Physik 95, 499–523 (July, 1935).
- H. Maier-Leibnitz: Absolute Zählrohrmessungen an γ-Strahlen, Zeitschrift für Naturforschung 1, 243 (1946).
- H. Maier-Leibnitz, W. Bothe: Experimental Nuclear Physics, Science 126, 246–247 (9 August 1957).
- H. Maier-Leibnitz and T. Springer: Ein Interferometer für langsame Neutronen, Zeitschrift für Physik 167, 386–402 (August, 1962).
- H. Maier-Leibnitz and T. Springer: The use of neutron optical devices on beam-hole experiments, J. Nucl. Energy 17, 217–225 (1963).
- H. Maier-Leibnitz: Grundlagen für die Beurteilung von Intensitäts- und Genauigkeitsfragen bei Neutronenstreumessungen, Nukleonik 8, 61 (1966: Invention of the neutron backscattering spectrometer).
- Friedrich Hund, Heinz Maier-Leibnitz, and Erich Mollwo: Physics in Göttingen with Franck, Born and Pohl, Eur. J. Phys. 9, 188-194 (1988).

== Books by Maier-Leibnitz ==
- Peter Kafka and Heinz Maier-Leibnitz Streitbriefe über Kernenergie. Zwei Physiker über Wissenschaft, Fortschritt und die Folgen (Piper, 1982).
- Heinz Maier-Leibnitz Lernschock Tschernobyl (Interfrom, 1986).
- Heinz Maier-Leibnitz Kochbuch für Füchse. Große Küche - schnell und gastlich [mit Hinweisen für d. Mikrowellenherd] (Piper, 1986).
- Peter Kafka and Heinz Maier-Leibnitz Kernenergie: Ja oder Nein? Eine Auseinandersetzung zwischen zwei Physikern (Piper, 1987).

== Bibliography ==
- Eckert, Michael Neutrons and politics: Maier-Leibnitz and the emergence of pile neutron research in the FRG, Historical Studies in the Physical and Biological Sciences Volume 19, Number 1, pp. 81 – 113 (1988).
- Edingshaus, Anne-Lydia Heinz Maier-Leibnitz: Ein halbes Jahrhundert experimentelle Physik (Piper, 1986).
- Kienle, Paul Heinz Meier-Leibnitz, Physics Today Volume 54, Number 8, pp. 65 – 66 (2001).
- Walker, Mark German National Socialism and the Quest for Nuclear Power 1939–1949 (Cambridge, 1993) ISBN 0-521-43804-7.

== See also ==
- Angular Correlation of Electron Positron Annihilation Radiation
