= Otto Haxel =

German nuclear physicist (1909–1998)

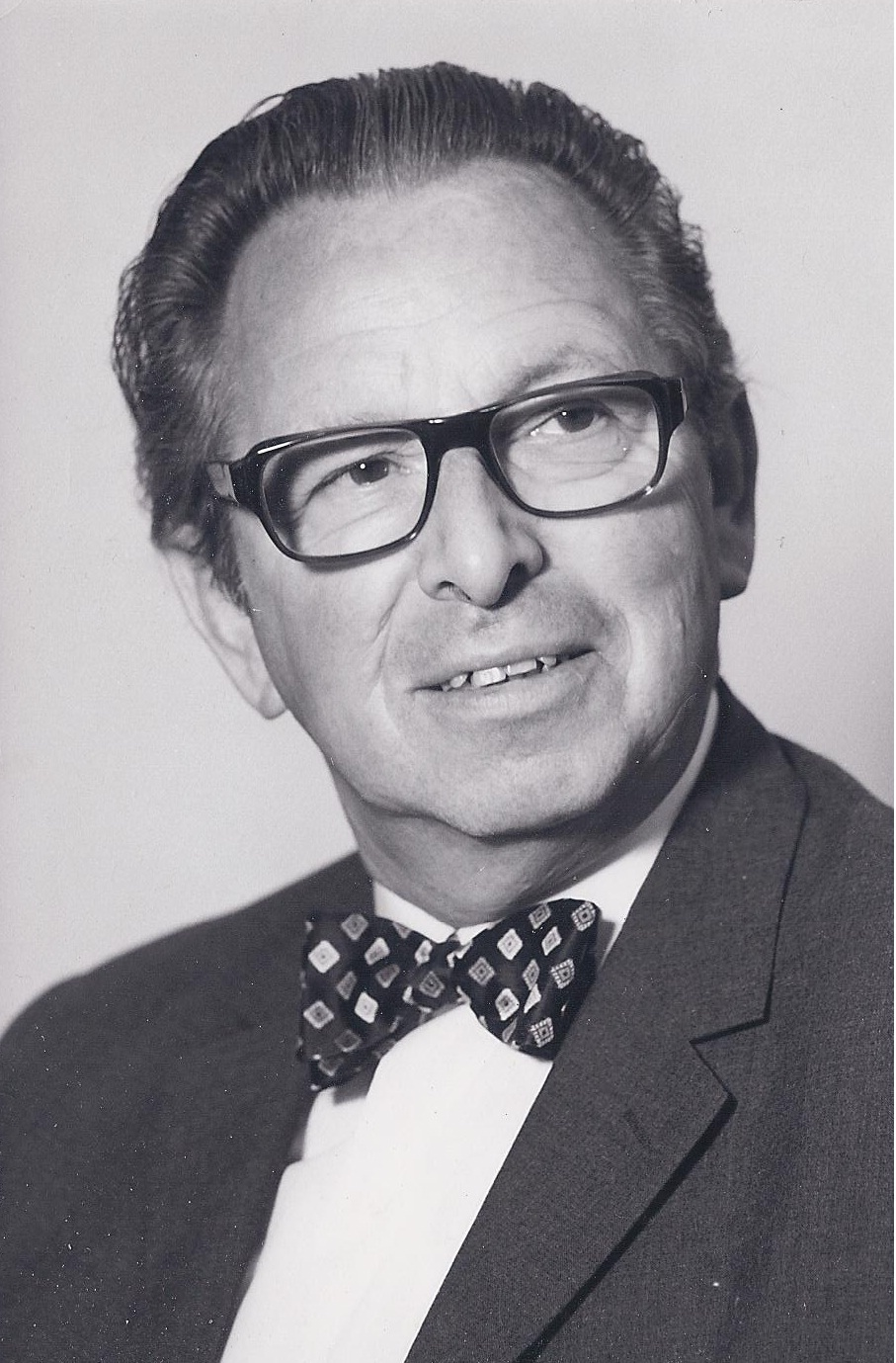
Otto Haxel

Otto Haxel (2 April 1909, in Neu-Ulm – 26 February 1998, in Heidelberg) was a German nuclear physicist. During World War II, he worked on the German nuclear energy project. After the war, he was on the staff of the Max Planck Institute for Physics in Göttingen. From 1950 to 1974, he was an ordinarius professor of physics at the University of Heidelberg, where he fostered the use of nuclear physics in environmental physics; this led to the founding of the Institute of Environmental Physics in 1975. During 1956 and 1957, he was a member of the Nuclear Physics Working Group of the German Atomic Energy Commission. From 1970 to 1975, he was the Scientific and Technical Managing Director of the Karlsruhe Research Center.

Haxel was a signatory of the Manifesto of the Göttingen Eighteen.

== Education ==
From 1927 to 1933, Haxel studied at the Technische Hochschule München (today, the Technical University of Munich) and the University of Tübingen. He received his doctorate in 1933, under Hans Geiger at the University of Tübingen. From 1933 to 1936, Haxel was Geiger’s teaching assistant there, and he completed his Habilitation in 1936.

== Career ==
In 1936, Geiger, as the successor to Gustav Hertz, became an ordinarius professor and department head at the Technische Hochschule Berlin (today, the Technische Universität Berlin, in Berlin-Charlottenburg. Haxel also went to the Technische Hochschule Berlin and became a teaching assistant there in 1936 and a lecturer in 1939.

It was in 1940 that Haxel met a future collaborator, Fritz Houtermans, who, through the auspices of Max von Laue, had been released that year from Gestapo incarceration.

From at least 1940 to early 1942, Haxel worked on the German nuclear energy project, also called the Uranverein (Uranium Club). He specialized in studies of neutron absorption in uranium (see, for example, the Internal Reports below authored with Helmut Volz, also a former student of Geiger). Haxel was called up for military service in early 1942. He was put in charge of a group doing nuclear research for the German Navy under Admiral Rhein, who had formerly been a submarine commander.

From 1946 to 1950, Haxel was a staff assistant to Werner Heisenberg at the Max-Planck Institut für Physik, in Göttingen. While there, he and Fritz Houtermans collaborated; Houtermans was at the II. Physikalischen Institut of the University of Göttingen. Haxel also worked on the development of “magic numbers” in nuclear shell theory with J. Hans D. Jensen at the Institut für theoretische Physik, Heidelberg, and Hans Suess at the Institut für physikalische Chemie, Hamburg. In 1949, Haxel was also appointed supernumerary professor (nichtplanmäßiger Professor) at the Georg-August-Universität Göttingen.

From 1950 to 1974, Haxel was an ordinarius professor (ordentlicher Professor) of physics at the University of Heidelberg. At the University of Heidelberg, Haxel was also director of the II. Physikalischen Institut. In the 1950s, mainly through the impetus of Haxel, environmental physics was developed there through the application of nuclear physics. This led to the founding of the Institut für Umweltphysik (Institute of Environmental Physics) in 1975, with Karl-Otto Münnich as its founding director.

During 1956 and 1957, Haxel was a member of the Arbeitskreis Kernphysik (Nuclear Physics Working Group) of the Fachkommission II „Forschung und Nachwuchs“ (Commission II “Research and Growth”) of the Deutschen Atomkommission (DAtK, German Atomic Energy Commission). Other members of the Nuclear Physics Working Group in both 1956 and 1957 were: Werner Heisenberg (chairman), Hans Kopfermann (vice-chairman), Fritz Bopp, Walther Bothe, Wolfgang Gentner, Willibald Jentschke, Heinz Maier-Leibnitz, Josef Mattauch, Wolfgang Riezler, Wilhelm Walcher, and Carl Friedrich von Weizsäcker. Wolfgang Paul was also a member of the group during 1957.

From 1970 to 1975, Haxel was the wissenschaftlich-technischen Geschäftsführer (Scientific and Technical Managing Director) of the Forschungszentrum Karlsruhe (Karlsruhe Research Center).

Haxel was a signatory of the manifesto of the Göttinger Achtzehn (Göttingen Eighteen).

== Personal ==
Haxel’s friend, Fritz Houtermans was married four times. Charlotte Riefenstahl, a physicist educated at the University of Göttingen, was his first and third wife in four marriages. In February 1944, Houtermans married Ilse Bartz, a chemical engineer; they worked together during the war and published a paper. Houtermans divorced Ilse and remarried Charlotte in August 1953. Haxel married Ilse after her divorce from Houtermans.

== Honors ==
The Freundeskreis des Forschungszentrums Karlsruhe e.V. (Friends of the Karlsruhe Research Center) established and awards the Otto-Haxel-Preis (Otto Haxel Prize), which is given for achievements in the nuclear energy industry.

In 1980, Haxel was awarded the Otto Hahn Prize of the City of Frankfurt am Main for his advocacy of and work on harnessing nuclear energy production.

== Internal Reports ==
The following reports were published in Kernphysikalische Forschungsberichte (Research Reports in Nuclear Physics), an internal publication of the German Uranverein. The reports were classified Top Secret, they had very limited distribution, and the authors were not allowed to keep copies. The reports were confiscated under the Allied Operation Alsos and sent to the United States Atomic Energy Commission for evaluation. In 1971, the reports were declassified and returned to Germany. The reports are available at the Karlsruhe Nuclear Research Center and the American Institute of Physics.

- Otto Haxel and Helmut Volz Über die Absorption von Neutronen in wässerigen Lösungen G-37 (17 December 1940)
- Otto Haxel and Helmut Volz Die Möglichkeit der technischen Energiegewinnung aus der Uranspaltung G-38 (11 June 1940)
- Otto Haxel, Ernst Stuhlinger, and Helmut Volz Über die Absorption und Verlangsamung von Neutronen in Berylliumoxyd G-91 (4 August 1941)
- Otto Haxel and Helmut Volz Über die Absorption von Neutronen im Uran G-118 (1 February 1941)

== Selected literature ==
- O. Haxel and F. G. Houtermans Gleichzeitige Emission von zwei Elektronen beim radioaktiven Zerfall des Rubidium 87, Zeitschrift für Physik Volume 124, Numbers 7–12, 705–713 (1948). Received 25 February 1948. Institutional affiliations: Haxel – Max-Planck-Institut für Physik, Göttingen and Houtermans – II. Physikalischen Institut der Universität Göttingen, Deutschland.
- O. Haxel, J. Hans D. Jensen, H. E. Suess Concerning the Interpretation of “Magic” Nucleon Numbers in Connection With the Structure of Atomic Nuclei, Die Naturwissenschaften Volume 35, 376 (1948)
- Otto Haxel, J. Hans D. Jensen, and Hans E. Suess On the “Magic Numbers” in Nuclear Structure, Phys. Rev. Volume 75, 1766 – 1766 (1949). Institutional affiliations: Haxel – Max-Planck Institut für Physik, Göttingen; Jensen – Institut für theoretische Physik, Heidelberg; and Suess – Institut für physikalische Chemie, Hamburg. Received 18 April 1949.
- H. E. Suess, O. Haxel, and J. H. D. Jensen On the Interpretation of the Magic Nucleon Numbers in the Structure of Atomic Nuclei [In German], Die Naturwissenschaften Volume 36, 153–155 (1949)
- O. Haxel, J. H. D. Jensen, and Hans E. Suess Modellmäsige deutung derausgezeichnetennukleonenzahlen im kernbau, Z. Physik Volume 128, 295–311 (1950)
- F. G. Houtermans, O. Haxel, and J. Heintze Half-Life of K^{40}, Z. Physik Volume 128, 657–667 (1950)
- W. Buhring and Otto Haxel Excitation of X Radiation from Ni, Cu, and Mo by Po^{210} Alpha Particles, Z. Physik Volume 148, 653–661 (1957)

== Books ==
- Otto Haxel Energiegewinnung aus Kernprozessen (Westdt. Verl., 1953)
- Otto Haxel and Heinz Filthuth Ein Vierteljahrhundert moderner Physik (Bibliographisches Inst., 1969)

== Bibliography ==
- Hentschel, Klaus (editor) and Ann M. Hentschel (editorial assistant and translator) Physics and National Socialism: An Anthology of Primary Sources (Birkhäuser, 1996) ISBN 0-8176-5312-0
- Powers, Thomas Heisenberg’s War: The Secret History of the German Bomb (Knopf, 1993)
- Walker, Mark German National Socialism and the Quest for Nuclear Power 1939–1949 (Cambridge, 1993) ISBN 0-521-43804-7
