= Nukleonik =

- Discipline: Nuclear physics, nuclear engineering
- Language: German
- Edited by: A. Boettcher (Jülich), W. Humbach (Darmstadt), W. Gebauhr (Erlangen)

Publication details
- History: 1958–1969
- Publisher: Springer Verlag (West Germany)

Standard abbreviations
- ISO 4: Nukleonik

Indexing
- ISSN: 0550-3612

Nukleonik was a West German scientific journal covering nuclear physics and nuclear engineering. The journal was established in 1958, shortly after restrictions on nuclear research in West Germany were lifted by the 1955 Paris Agreements. It was published by Springer Verlag until 1969, as Springer Verlag considered that Zeitschrift für Physik was covering nuclear science sufficiently.

== Notable papers ==
- Heinz Maier-Leibnitz (1966). "Grundlagen für die Beurteilung von Intensitäts- und Genauigkeitsfragen bei Neutronenstreumessungen". Nukleonik (in German). 8 (2): 61. (invention of the neutron backscattering spectrometer)
