= Gerhard Kraft =

German physicist (1941–2023)

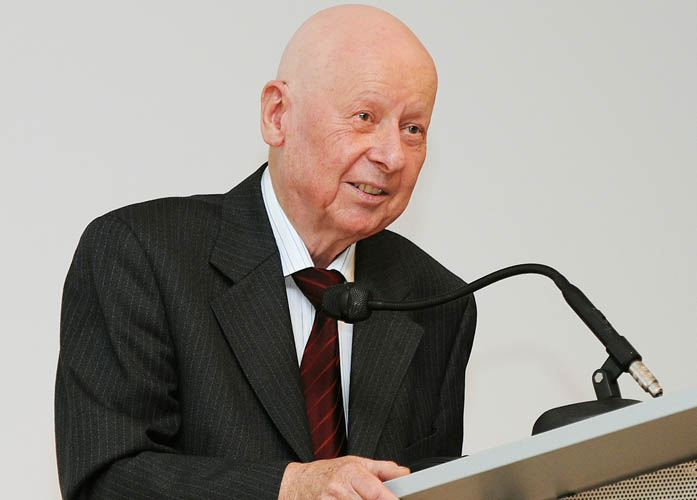
Kraft in 2016

Gerhard Kraft (29 October 1941 – 18 March 2023) was a German physicist, best known for introducing heavy ion cancer therapy in Europe.

He was the founder and director of the Biophysics Department at the GSI Helmholtz Centre for Heavy Ion Research in Darmstadt (Germany). Particle therapy had already been performed in US and Japan using protons, carbon, and other light ions. Gerhard Kraft introduced it in Europe, with two significant innovations: raster scanning and biological treatment planning. Under his direction, 440 patients were treated from 1997 to 2008 at GSI. Therapy now continues at the Heidelberger Ionenstrahl-Therapiezentrum using the system introduced at GSI.

== Biography ==
Gerhard Kraft was born on 29 October 1941 in Heidelberg. He studied Physics in Heidelberg and Cologne. Kraft got his PhD at the University of Cologne with a study of energy loss of carbon ions in matter. After a two year fellowship at the Lawrence Berkeley Laboratory (Berkeley, CA, US) under the supervision of Cornelius A. Tobias, he went back to Germany with the idea of using high-energy carbon ions to cure cancer. Since 1981 he started his work on heavy-ion radiobiology and radiotherapy at GSI, and the treatment room was completed in 1997. The last patient was treated in 2008. Kraft died on 18 March 2023 in Heidelberg.

== Awards ==
Kraft received many awards over his career, some of which are listed below:

- 1993 Honorary professor at the University of Kassel
- 1999 Erwin Schrödinger Award, Helmholtz Association
- 2000 Otto Hahn Prize of the City of Frankfurt am Main
- 2006 Bacq & Alexander Award, European Radiation Research Society
- 2006 Ulrich Hagen Award, German Society for Radiation Research
- 2008 Officer's Cross of the Order of Merit of the Federal Republic of Germany
- 2008–2011 Helmholtz Honorary Professor
- 2009 Ph.D. h.c., University of Giessen
- 2013 Honorary member of Particle Therapy Co-Operative Group (PTCOG)
- 2015 Honorary member of Deutsche Gesellschaft für medizinische Physik (DGMP)
- 2018–2021 Honorary President of European Radiation Research Society

== Publications ==
- Bethge, K.; Kraft, G.; Kreisler, P.; Walter, G. (27 April 2004). Medical Applications of Nuclear Physics. Springer Science & Business Media. ISBN 978-3-540-20805-1.
- Kraft, Gerhard (1998). "Radiotherapy with Heavy Ions: Radiobiology, Clinical Indications and Experience at GSI, Darmstadt". Tumori Journal. 84 (2). SAGE Publications: 200–204. doi:10.1177/030089169808400217. ISSN 0300-8916. PMID 9620245. S2CID 25579345.
- Kraft, Gerhard (2005). "Tumortherapie mit Ionenstrahlen". Bionik. Berlin/Heidelberg: Springer-Verlag. pp. 409–421. doi:10.1007/3-540-26948-7_24. ISBN 3-540-21890-4.
- Amaldi, Ugo; Kraft, Gerhard (2005). "Recent applications of Synchrotrons in cancer therapy with Carbon Ions". Europhysics News. 36 (4). EDP Sciences: 114–118. Bibcode:2005ENews..36..114A. doi:10.1051/epn:2005402. ISSN 0531-7479.
- Amaldi, Ugo; Kraft, Gerhard (11 July 2005). "Radiotherapy with beams of carbon ions". Reports on Progress in Physics. 68 (8). IOP Publishing: 1861–1882. Bibcode:2005RPPh...68.1861A. doi:10.1088/0034-4885/68/8/r04. ISSN 0034-4885. S2CID 121346829.
- Eickhoff, Hartmut; Haberer, Thomas; Kraft, Gerhard; Krause, Udo; Richter, Mathias; Steiner, Rudolf; Debus, Jürgen (1999). "The GSI Cancer Therapy Project". Strahlentherapie und Onkologie. 175 (S2). Springer Science and Business Media LLC: 21–24. doi:10.1007/bf03038880. ISSN 0179-7158. PMID 10394389. S2CID 13870164.
- Haberer, Th.; Becher, W.; Schardt, D.; Kraft, G. (1993). "Magnetic scanning system for heavy ion therapy". Nuclear Instruments and Methods in Physics Research Section A: Accelerators, Spectrometers, Detectors and Associated Equipment. 330 (1–2). Elsevier BV: 296–305. Bibcode:1993NIMPA.330..296H. doi:10.1016/0168-9002(93)91335-k. ISSN 0168-9002.
