= Kurt Starke =

German chemist (1911–2000)

Kurt Starke (1911 in Berlin – 19 January 2000) was a German radiochemist. During World War II, he worked on the German nuclear energy project, also known as the Uranium Club. He independently discovered the transuranic element neptunium. From 1947 to 1959, he taught and did research in Canada and the United States. From 1959 until he achieved emeritus status, he was in Germany at Marburg University, where he established and became director of the Institute of Nuclear Chemistry. He was also the first dean of the Department of Physical Chemistry of Marburg University, which opened in 1971.

== Education ==
From 1931 to 1936, Starke studied at the Friedrich Wilhelm University of Berlin. He was awarded his doctorate there in 1937, under Otto Hahn.

== Career ==
From 1937, Starke was an assistant to Otto Hahn at the Kaiser-Wilhelm-Institut für Chemie (KWIC, Kaiser Wilhelm Institute for Chemistry; today, the Max Planck Institut für Chemie - Otto Hahn Institut), in Berlin-Dahlem. In 1940, scientists in both Germany and America were working on transuranic elements. Starke discovered the transuranic element neptunium (atomic number 93), independently of the American team of Edwin McMillan and Philip Abelson. The war and his move to Munich in 1941 delayed publication of his results until 1942.

In 1941, Starke transferred to the Institut für physikalische Chemie under Klaus Clusius at the Ludwig-Maximilians-Universität München. Shortly after the move, Starke was drafted into military service. It was only through the persistent efforts of Clusius that Starke granted a reprieve. Starke subsequently accepted a position to work with the German group at the Paris cyclotron, initially headed by Wolfgang Gentner, from Walther Bothe's Institut für Physik at Heidelberg University. Under Clusius, Starke worked on the German nuclear energy project, also known as the Uranverein (Uranium Club). Starke worked on the enrichment of the uranium isotope U^{239}, its decay products, and the production of heavy water. In 1943, Starke completed his Habilitation at the Ludwig-Maximilians-Universität München.

As the war raged on, the demand for men to provide armed service resulted in the drafting of many engineers and physicists, especially for the Russian Front; Paul O. Müller, who had worked on the Uranverein, was drafted and died in service on the Russian front. Starke had eluded military service in 1941, but, in a confrontation with Abraham Esau, Hermann Göring’s Bevollmächtiger (plenipotentiary) for nuclear physics research under the Reichsforschungsrat (RFR, Reich Research Council), threatened Starke with transfer to the Russian front in the fall of 1943. It was not until 1944 that Werner Osenberg, head of the planning board at the Reichsforschungsrat, was able to initiate calling back 5000 engineers and scientists from the front to work on research categorized as kriegsentscheidend (decisive for the war effort). By the end of the war, the number recalled had reached 15,000.

From 1944, after completion of his Habilitation, Starke was an assistant at Walther Bothe's Institut für Physik (Institute of Physics) at the Kaiser-Wilhelm Institut für medizinische Forschung (KWImF, Kaiser Wilhelm Institute for Medical Research; today, the Max-Planck Institut für medizinische Forschung), in Heidelberg.

After the conclusion of World War II, between the ravages of the war and the restrictions of the Allied occupation forces in Germany, the prospects of meaningful scientific work were limited. By March 1947, Heinz Maier-Leibnitz, Kurt Stark, and other younger collaborators with Bothe at the Institut für Physik had left for North America. Stark taught and did research successively at McMaster University (Hamilton, Ontario, Canada), University of British Columbia (near Vancouver), and the University of Kentucky (Lexington, Kentucky]).

In 1959, Starke took an appointment at Marburg University, where he dedicated himself to the establishment of the Instituts für Kernchemie (Institute of Nuclear Chemistry), and was appointed its director. In 1971, he moved his institute to the premises of the newly created and built Fachbereich Physikalische Chemie (Department of Physical Chemistry), and he was its first Dekan (dean). He remained at Marburg University until he achieved emeritus status.

== Internal Reports ==
The following reports were published in Kernphysikalische Forschungsberichte (Research Reports in Nuclear Physics), an internal publication of the German Uranverein. The reports were classified Top Secret, they had very limited distribution, and the authors were not allowed to keep copies. The reports were confiscated under the Allied Operation Alsos and sent to the United States Atomic Energy Commission for evaluation. In 1971, the reports were declassified and returned to Germany. The reports are available at the Karlsruhe Nuclear Research Center and the American Institute of Physics.

- Kurt Starke Anreicherung des künstlich redioaktiven Uran-Isotops U^{239} und seines Folgeproduktes 93^{239} (Element 93) G-113 (20 May 1941)
- Klaus Clusius and Kurt Starke Zur Gewinnung von schwerem Wasser G-134 (24 February 1942)
- Klaus Clusius and Kurt Starke Zur Theorie der franktionierten Destillation von H_{2}-HD-D_{2} Gemischen G-189 (29 June 1942)

== Bibliography ==
- Hentschel, Klaus (Editor) and Ann M. Hentschel (Editorial Assistant and Translator) Physics and National Socialism: An Anthology of Primary Sources (Birkhäuser, 1996)
- In Memoriam Professor em. Dr. phil. Kurt Starke, Philipps-Universität Marburg 2000
- Macrakis, Kristie Surviving the Swastika: Scientific Research in Nazi Germany (Oxford, 1993)
- Walker, Mark German National Socialism and the Quest for Nuclear Power 1939–1949 (Cambridge, 1993) ISBN 0-521-43804-7
