= Jürgen Troe =

German physicist

Hans-Jürgen Troe (born 4 August 1940) is a German physicist from the University of Göttingen. He was awarded the status of Fellow in the American Physical Society, after he was nominated by his Division of Chemical Physics in 2009, for "experimental and theoretical research on the kinetics of unimolecular reactions of neutral and ionic molecules, and especially for the development of the statistical adiabatic channel model and its application to unimolecular processes from low to high pressures." He was awarded the Otto Hahn Prize in 2015.

== See also ==
- List of fellows of the American Physical Society (1998–2010)
