= Göttingen Manifesto =

1957 document

The Göttingen Manifesto was a declaration of 18 leading nuclear scientists of West Germany (among them the Nobel laureates Otto Hahn, Max Born, Werner Heisenberg and Max von Laue) against arming the West German army with tactical nuclear weapons in the 1950s, the early part of the Cold War, as the West German government under chancellor Adenauer had suggested.

== History ==
In the Second World War some of the signing scientists had been members of the Uranverein, a nuclear research project of the Nazi regime. The war ended with the nuclear destruction of the cities of Hiroshima and Nagasaki by the United States.

After World War II the Cold War began. In 1953 the hydrogen bomb was invented. A short time later both superpowers, the United States and the Soviet Union, had a so-called overkill potential. In the whole world and especially in the frontier states of the Cold War there was a great fear of nuclear war at that time.

Germany was divided, and both German states were frontier states in the Cold War. In May 1955, West Germany became a sovereign nation and joined NATO. It founded its own army, the Bundeswehr, in 1955. There were many protests against the remilitarisation of West Germany. In 1956 East Germany founded its own army, the Nationale Volksarmee (NVA).

Following the end of the Korean War, NATO's focus shifted to Europe. Through NATO, the United States deployed its first nuclear weapons in West Germany in March 1955. This led to proposals for the development of similar capabilities for newly created West German army (Bundeswehr) in the course of the year 1956. Franz Josef Strauss, appointed Federal Minister of Nuclear Energy in 1955, and Defence Minister in 1956, was charged with building up the West German defence forces.

Attempts by German nuclear physicists, including Otto Hahn and Carl Friedrich von Weizsäcker, to dissuade Germany politicians from nuclear expansion were felt to be unsuccessful. On April 5, 1957 chancellor Konrad Adenauer trivialized tactical nuclear weapons in a press release as "especially harmless weapons". The Göttingen Eighteen wrote the following manifesto on April 12, 1957. Albert Schweitzer followed the Manifesto with his Declaration of Conscience speech, broadcast widely on 23 April 1957.

== The Manifesto ==
The undersigned nuclear researchers are deeply concerned with the plans to equip the Bundeswehr with nuclear weapons. Some of us have raised our concerns a few months ago with the appropriate federal minister. Today the debate on this question has become general knowledge. The undersigned therefore feel the requirement to speak up about facts known to experts, but which seem to be inadequately known to the public.

1) Tactical nuclear weapons have the same destructive effect as normal atomic bombs. They are "tactical" only insofar as they are applied not only to civilian residences, but also to ground troops. Every single tactical nuclear weapon has a similar effect to the first atom bomb which destroyed Hiroshima. Since tactical nuclear weapons are available in significant numbers their destructive effect is on the whole much larger. They are only "small" in comparison to recently developed bombs, principally the hydrogen bomb.

2) There is no natural limit for the development of life-threatening effects of strategic nuclear weapons. Today a tactical nuclear weapon can destroy a small city, and a hydrogen bomb can render an entire region such as the Ruhr Valley uninhabitable. Already today, one can probably wipe out the entire population of West Germany with the radioactivity from H-bombs. We know of no technical means to protect a large population from this threat.

We realise how difficult it is to foresee the political consequences of these facts. Since we are apolitical, no one expects us to do so. Our profession, i.e. pure science and its application, through which we bring many young people into our fold, leaves us with the responsibility for the potential effects of these actions. Therefore we cannot remain silent to all political issues. We align ourselves with the freedom that the Western world represents against Communism. We cannot deny the fear of the H-bomb contributes to the maintenance of peace in the whole world, and freedom in part of the world. However this form of peace and freedom is in the long term untenable, and the collapse of this situation is potentially deadly. We have no expertise to make concrete political suggestions to the superpowers. We believe that a small country such as the Federal Republic is best protected, and world peace most assisted when nuclear weapons of any type are banned. In any case, none of the undersigned are prepared to participate in the creation, testing or deployment of any type of nuclear weapon. At the same time we feel it is extremely important that we continue to work together on the peaceful development of nuclear energy.

Fritz Bopp, Max Born, Rudolf Fleischmann, Walther Gerlach, Otto Hahn, Otto Haxel, Werner Heisenberg, Hans Kopfermann, Max v. Laue, Heinz Maier-Leibnitz, Josef Mattauch, Friedrich Paneth, Wolfgang Paul, Wolfgang Riezler, Fritz Straßmann, Wilhelm Walcher, Carl Friedrich Frhr. v. Weizsäcker, Karl Wirtz

== German original text ==
The original text of the Manifesto, in German, is as follows:

Die Pläne einer atomaren Bewaffnung der Bundeswehr erfüllen die unterzeichnenden Atomforscher mit tiefer Sorge. Einige von ihnen haben den zuständigen Bundesministern ihre Bedenken schon vor mehreren Monaten mitgeteilt. Heute ist eine Debatte über diese Frage allgemein geworden. Die Unterzeichnenden fühlen sich daher verpflichtet, öffentlich auf einige Tatsachen hinzuweisen, die alle Fachleute wissen, die aber der Öffentlichkeit noch nicht hinreichend bekannt zu sein scheinen.

1. Taktische Atomwaffen haben die zerstörende Wirkung normaler Atombomben. Als "taktisch" bezeichnet man sie, um auszudrücken, daß sie nicht nur gegen menschliche Siedlungen, sondern auch gegen Truppen im Erdkampf eingesetzt werden sollen. Jede einzelne taktische Atombombe oder -granate hat eine ähnliche Wirkung wie die erste Atombombe, die Hiroshima zerstört hat. Da die taktischen Atomwaffen heute in großer Zahl vorhanden sind, würde ihre zerstörende Wirkung im ganzen sehr viel größer sein. Als "klein" bezeichnet man diese Bomben nur im Vergleich zur Wirkung der inzwischen entwickelten "strategischen" Bomben, vor allem der Wasserstoffbomben.

2. Für die Entwicklungsmöglichkeit der lebensausrottenden Wirkung der strategischen Atomwaffen ist keine natürliche Grenze bekannt. Heute kann eine taktische Atombombe eine kleinere Stadt zerstören, eine Wasserstoffbombe aber einen Landstrich von der Größe des Ruhrgebietes zeitweilig unbewohnbar machen. Durch Verbreitung von Radioaktivität könnte man mit Wasserstoffbomben die Bevölkerung der Bundesrepublik wahrscheinlich schon heute ausrotten. Wir kennen keine technische Möglichkeit, große Bevölkerungsmengen vor dieser Gefahr sicher zu schützen.

Wir wissen, wie schwer es ist, aus diesen Tatsachen die politischen Konsequenzen zu ziehen. Uns als Nichtpolitikern wird man die Berechtigung dazu abstreiten wollen; unsere Tätigkeit, die der reinen Wissenschaft und ihrer Anwendung gilt und bei der wir viele junge Menschen unserem Gebiet zuführen, belädt uns aber mit einer Verantwortung für die möglichen Folgen dieser Tätigkeit. Deshalb können wir nicht zu allen politischen Fragen schweigen. Wir bekennen uns zur Freiheit, wie sie heute die westliche Welt gegen den Kommunismus vertritt. Wir leugnen nicht, daß die gegenseitige Angst vor den Wasserstoffbomben heute einen wesentlichen Beitrag zur Erhaltung des Friedens in der ganzen Welt und der Freiheit in einem Teil der Welt leistet. Wir halten aber diese Art, den Frieden und die Freiheit zu sichern, auf die Dauer für unzuverlässig, und wir halten die Gefahr im Falle des Versagens für tödlich. Wir fühlen keine Kompetenz, konkrete Vorschläge für die Politik der Großmächte zu machen. Für ein kleines Land wie die Bundesrepublik glauben wir, daß es sich heute noch am besten schützt und den Weltfrieden noch am ehesten fördert, wenn es ausdrücklich und freiwillig auf den Besitz von Atomwaffen jeder Art verzichtet. Jedenfalls wäre keiner der Unterzeichnenden bereit, sich an der Herstellung, der Erprobung oder dem Einsatz von Atomwaffen in irgendeiner Weise zu beteiligen. Gleichzeitig betonen wir, daß es äußerst wichtig ist, die friedliche Verwendung der Atomenergie mit allen Mitteln zu fördern, und wir wollen an dieser Aufgabe wie bisher mitwirken.

Fritz Bopp, Max Born, Rudolf Fleischmann, Walther Gerlach, Otto Hahn, Otto Haxel, Werner Heisenberg, Hans Kopfermann, Max v. Laue, Heinz Maier-Leibnitz, Josef Mattauch, Friedrich-Adolf Paneth, Wolfgang Paul, Wolfgang Riezler, Fritz Straßmann, Wilhelm Walcher, Carl Friedrich Frhr. v. Weizsäcker, Karl Wirtz
