= Olga Aleinikova =

Russian physician

Olga Vitalyevna Aleinikova

Head of the Belarusian Research Center for Pediatric Oncology, Hematology and Immunology

Personal details
- Born: November 10, 1951 Leningrad, USSR
- Awards: Ehrenzeichen für Verdienste um die Republik Österreich (2004); Honored Worker of Science of the Republic of Belarus (2014)

Olga Aleinikova (born 10 November 1951 in Leningrad) — is a pediatric-oncohematologist, PhD, Doctor of Medical Science (1999), Professor (2003), Corresponding Member of the National Academy of Sciences of Belarus, Director of State Institution "Belarusian Research Center for Pediatric Oncology, Hematology and Immunology".

== Biography ==
Olga Aleinikova graduated from high school №64 in Minsk. In 1975 she graduated from the pediatric faculty of the Minsk State Medical Institute. In 1976 – internship in pediatrics. In 1976–1996 Olga Aleinikova was working as a pediatrician in the 1st Minsk City Clinical Hospital: 1978 – pediatric hematologist. Since 1978 has been the head of the children's hematology department. Since 1992 –The Deputy Chief Doctor the 1st Minsk City Clinical Hospital at the Children’s oncohematology.

Since June 2, 1996 has been Director of State Institution “Belarusian Research Center for Pediatric Oncology, Hematology and Immunology”.

In 1998 Olga was given the highest qualification category, specialty pediatrician In 2001 – was awarded the highest qualification category in The Health Organization.

== Scientific activities ==
In 1989 Olga Aleinikova defended the Ph.D: “Hormonal status, the potassium content in myelokaryocytes for children with acute lymphoblastic leukemia”. In December 1999 – a Doctor of Medical Science thesis on the topic" New technologies in the treatment of acute leukemia in children "(at the Research Institute of Pediatric Hematology Health Ministry, Moscow).This was the result of a long-term work on introduction highly effective technologies of diagnosis and treatment of hematological diseases for children in Belarus. This work became the basis for the creation of modern treatment guidelines.

In 2003: title of Professor of clinical medicine specialty.

In 2004–2011: Head of the Medical Research Council of Ministry of Health of the Republic of Belarus. Since 2006: a member of the Expert Council of the Higher Certifying Commission, oncology specialty ВАК. Is a member of the scientific communities:

- International Society of Paediatric Oncology (SIOP),
- European Society of Pediatric Hematology – Immunology (ESPHI),
- European Group for Blood and Marrow Transplantation (EBMT).

Is a member of the editorial board:

- Member of the Editorial Board of "Oncopediatric",
- Chief editor of "Hematology and Blood Transfusion. Eastern Europe "(Belarus-Ukraine-Russia),

The most significant results of activities:

- Creation of the Belarusian school of Pediatric Oncology / Hematology,
- Creation of a Population Registration System of childhood cancer, integrated into the international network,
- Creation of high service organization for Pediatric Oncology and Hematology, which allowed to achieve world-class results in the treatment of malignant neoplasms for children.

Olga Aleinikova has trained 12 candidates of medical sciences (PhD) and 3 Doctors of Medical Sciences, has published more than 500 publications, including 6 monographs, received 6 patents.

== Educational activities ==
In 2002 Olga was elected Professor of the Department of Clinical Hematology and Blood Transfusion of Pediatric Hematology of the Belarusian Medical Academy of Post-Graduate Education. From 2005 to 2011 – Head of the Department of Pediatric Oncology and Hematology of the Belarusian Medical Academy of Post-Graduate Education.

== Awards ==
- Otto Hahn Prize of the City of Frankfurt am Main (1992) for the treatment of children cancer affected by the Chernobyl Accident
- Honorary Diploma of the Council of Ministers Republic of Belarus (1997) – for the construction of the National Scientific Center of Pediatric Oncology and Hematology
- Sign of "Excellent Health of the Republic of Belarus" (1999)
- Honorary Sign " Goldenes Ehrenzeichen für Verdienste um die Republik Österreich " (2004) – for the development of cancer care for children
- Honorary Diploma of the National Parliament of Belarus (2006) – for his personal contribution to the organization and development of Pediatric Oncology, Hematology and Transplantation in the Republic of Belarus
- Medal «За трудовые заслуги» (For Distinction in Labour) (2009) – for development of Pediatric Oncology, Hematology and Transplantation
- Diploma Patriarch of the Orthodox Church (2011)
- The Honorary Title «Заслуженный деятель науки Республики Беларусь» (Honored Worker of Science of the Republic of Belarus) (2014)
