= Helmut Volz =

German nuclear physicist

Helmut Volz (German: [fɔlts]; 1 August 1911 in Göppingen – 23 October 1978) was a German experimental nuclear physicist who worked on the German nuclear energy project during World War II. In the latter years of World War II, he became a professor at the University of Erlangen–Nuremberg. He declined to take a position offered to him in the United States after the war, and he continued his teaching and research at the University of Erlangen–Nuremberg.

== Education ==
From 1929 to 1933, Volz studied at the University of Tübingen and the Ludwig-Maximilians-Universität München. He received his doctorate in 1935 under Hans Geiger at the University of Tübingen.

== Career ==
From 1935 to 1937, Volz worked at and studied physics at the Institut für theoretische Physik of Leipzig University. From 1937 to 1944, Volz was a teaching assistant to Hans Geiger at the Technische Hochschule Berlin in Berlin-Charlottenburg. During this period, Volz worked on the German nuclear energy project, also called the Uranverein (Uranium Club). He specialized in experimental studies of neutron absorption in uranium, conducted with another former student of Geiger, Otto Haxel. From 1943 to 1944, he was also a lecturer at the Technische Hochschule Berlin.

From 1944, Volz was an extraordinarius professor (professor without a chair) at the University of Erlangen–Nuremberg.

Near the close and after the end of World War II in Europe, the Russians and the Western powers had programs to foster technology transfer and exploit German technical specialists. For example, the U.S. had Operation Paperclip and the Russians had trophy brigades advancing with their military forces. In the area of atomic technology, the U.S. had Operation Alsos and the Russians had their version. While operational aspects of the Russian operation were modelled after the trophy brigades, a more refined approach was warranted for the exploitation of German atomic related facilities, intellectual materials, and scientific personnel. This was rectified with a decree in late 1944 and the formation of specialised exploitation teams in early 1945 under the Russian Alsos, which had broader objectives, including wholesale relocation of scientific facilities to the Soviet Union.

Volz was offered a position in the United States through Operation Paperclip. Volz had received a letter from the Munich Branch of the American War Department indicating that he had been suggested for a position in the United States and that he should henceforth report any change of address to the United States occupation authorities. The letter was not clear if this offer was voluntary or compulsory. Under further investigation, Volz found that the offer had a number of stipulations. On the positive side, his family in Germany would receive better quality care and rations than the average citizen of Germany under the occupation. On the other hand, he would not be allowed to correspond with anyone other than his relatives, he was to obey all orders, he would be restricted to a 50-mile radius around his duty station, and the minimum obligation had to be for at least six months. Furthermore, after his contractual period, he would not be allowed to return to Germany without permission of his employer. That was the last straw; Volz declined the offer. However, even with these conditions, the United States was able to attract considerable scientific talent to the United States under Operation Paperclip, as the living conditions in Germany were harsh and there were limited opportunities for meaningful scientific work there.

From 1958, Volz was an ordinarius professor at the University of Erlangen–Nuremberg.

== Internal reports ==
The following reports were published in Kernphysikalische Forschungsberichte (Research Reports in Nuclear Physics), an internal publication of the German Uranverein. The reports were classified Top Secret, they had very limited distribution, and the authors were not allowed to keep copies. The reports were confiscated under the Allied Operation Alsos and sent to the United States Atomic Energy Commission for evaluation. In 1971, the reports were declassified and returned to Germany. The reports are available at the Karlsruhe Nuclear Research Center and the American Institute of Physics.

- Otto Haxel and Helmut Volz Über die Absorption von Neutronen in wässerigen Lösungen G-37 (17 December 1940)
- Otto Haxel and Helmut Volz Die Möglichkeit der technischen Energiegewinnung aus der Uranspaltung G-38 (11 June 1940)
- Otto Haxel, Ernst Stuhlinger, and Helmut Volz Über die Absorption und Verlangsamung von Neutronen in Berylliumoxyd G-91 (4 August 1941)
- Helmut Volz Über die Absorption des Urans im Resonanzgebiet G-116 (1941)
- Helmut Volz Über die Geschwindigkeitsverteilung der Neutronen in einem Gemisch von schwerem Wasser und Uran G-117 (1941)
- Otto Haxel and Helmut Volz Über die Absorption von Neutronen im Uran G-118 (1 February 1941)

== Bibliography ==
- H. Volz Über die Größe der Kernkräfte, Zeitschrift für Physik Volume 105, Numbers 9-10, 537-552 (1937). Institutional citation: Institut für theoretische Physik der Universität, Leipzig. Received 16 March 1937.
- H. Volz Über die Größe der neuen Kernkräfte, Die Naturwissenschaften Volume 25, Number 13, 200-101 (1937). Institutional citation: Leipzig, Institut fiir theoretiscbe Physik. Received 30 January 1937.
- Helmut Volz Wirkungsquerschnitte für die Absorption langsamer Neutronen, Zeitschrift für Physik Volume 121, Numbers 3-4, 201-235 (1943). Institutional affiliation: Berlin-Charlottenburg. Received 27 January 1943.
- M. Reinecke, H. Ruder, and H. Volz Influence of the residual interaction V_{pn} on the rotational spectrum of the odd-odd nucleus ^{166}Ho [In German] Z. Naturforsch. Volume 27a, Number 5, 850-859 (1972). Institutional citation: University of Erlangen.
