= Otto Hahn Prize =

German science award

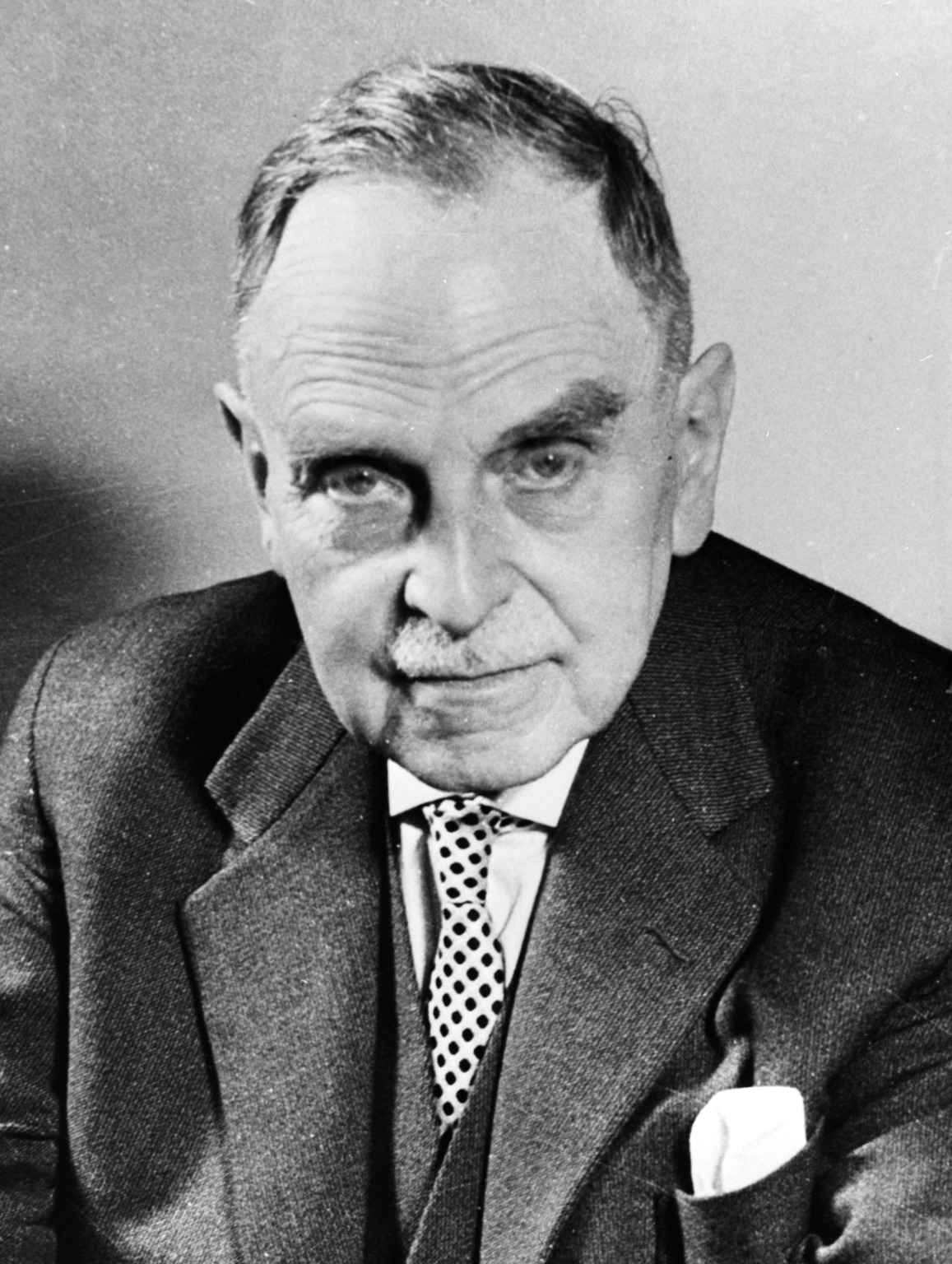
Otto Hahn

The Otto Hahn Prize is awarded biennially jointly by the Society of German Chemists (Gesellschaft Deutscher Chemiker), the German Physical Society (Deutschen Physikalischen Gesellschaft) and the city of Frankfurt am Main for outstanding achievement in the field of chemistry, physics or applied engineering science. It was established in 2005 by the merger of the previous Otto Hahn Prize for Chemistry and Physics and the Otto Hahn Prize of the City of Frankfurt am Main. The award is presented in the St. Paul's Church, Frankfurt am Main.

The award named after the German nuclear scientist and Nobel laureate Otto Hahn and consists of a gold medal and a prize of 50,000 euros. It is awarded alternatively for Chemistry and Physics.

== Recipients: Otto Hahn Prize for Chemistry and Physics ==
- 1955: Lise Meitner, Heinrich Wieland
- 1959: Hans Meerwein
- 1962: Manfred Eigen
- 1965: Erich Hückel
- 1967: Georg Wittig
- 1974: Friedrich Hund
- 1979: Rolf Huisgen
- 1982: Walter Greiner
- 1986: Heinz Maier-Leibnitz
- 1989: Rudolf Hoppe
- 1998: Dieter Oesterhelt
- 2000: Hans Christoph Wolf
- 2003: Helmut Schwarz
- 2005: merged with Otto Hahn Prize of the City of Frankfurt am Main

== Recipients: Otto Hahn Prize of the City of Frankfurt am Main ==
- 1970: Karl zum Winkel
- 1972: Rudolf Schulten, Physicist and nuclear technologist
- 1974: August Weckesser
- 1976: Adolf Birkhofer
- 1979: Wolfgang Gentner
- 1980: Otto Haxel
- 1982: Walter Greiner
- 1984: Heinz Maier-Leibnitz
- 1986: Klaus Knizia
- 1988: Franz Baumgärtner
- 1992: Olga Aleinikova
- 1994: Willi Wölfli
- 1996: Gottfried Münzenberg, Sigurd Hofmann
- 1998: Hans Blix, Jens Volker Kratz, Norbert Trautmann
- 2000: Hartmut Eickhoff, Thomas Haberer, Gerhard Kraft
- 2005 Theodor W. Hänsch, physics
- 2007 Gerhard Ertl, physics/chemistry
- 2009 Stefan Hell, physics
- 2011 Manfred T. Reetz, chemistry
- 2013 Ferenc Krausz, physics
- 2015 Jürgen Troe, physics
- 2017 Karsten Danzmann, chemistry
- 2019 Martin Jansen, chemistry
- 2021 Klaus Blaum, nuclear physics
- 2023 Herbert Waldmann, molecular physiology/chemical biology
- 2025 Peter Hommelhoff, quantum physics

== See also ==
- Otto Hahn Medal
- Otto Hahn Peace Medal
- List of chemistry awards
- List of physics awards
- List of engineering awards
- List of prizes named after people
