= Rudolf Fleischmann =

German nuclear physicist (1903–2002)

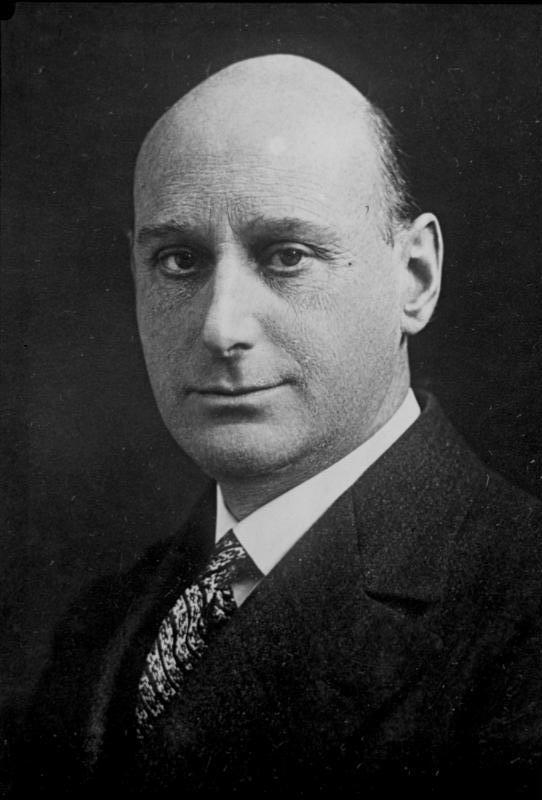
Rudolf Fleischmann

Rudolf Fleischmann (1 May 1903 – 3 February 2002) was a German experimental nuclear physicist from Erlangen, Bavaria. He worked for Walther Bothe at the Physics Institute of Heidelberg University and then at the Institute for Physics of the Kaiser Wilhelm Institute for Medical Research. Through his association with Bothe, he became involved in the German nuclear energy project, also known as the Uranium Club; one of Fleischmann's areas of interest was isotope separation techniques. In 1941 he was appointed associate professor of experimental physics at the newly established Reichsuniversität Straßburg, in France. Late in 1944, he was arrested under the American Operation Alsos and sent to the United States. After he returned to Germany 1946, he became Director of the State Physical Institute at the University of Hamburg and developed it as a center of nuclear research. In 1953, he took a position at the University of Erlangen and achieved emeritus status in 1969. He was a signatory of the Göttingen Manifesto in 1957.

== Education ==
From 1922 to 1926, Fleischmann studied at the University of Erlangen and the Ludwig-Maximilians-Universität München. He received his doctorate in 1929 under Bernhard Gudden, director of the Physics Institute at Erlangen; the subject of his thesis was on the photoelectric effect in solid-state physics.

== Career ==
In 1931, Fleischmann became a teaching assistant to Robert Pohl, director of the I. Physikalische Institut (First Physics Institute) at the University of Göttingen. There he continued his work on solid-state physics.

In 1932, Walther Bothe had succeeded Philipp Lenard as Director of the Physikalische und Radiologische Institut (Physical and Radiological Institute) at Heidelberg University. It was then that Fleischmann became a teaching assistant to Bothe. When Adolf Hitler became Chancellor of Germany on 30 January 1933, the concept of Deutsche Physik took on more favor as well as fervor; deutsche Physik, was anti-Semitic and anti-theoretical physics, especially modern physics, including quantum mechanics and both atomic and nuclear physics. As applied in the university environment, political factors took priority over the historically applied concept of scholarly ability, even though its two most prominent supporters were the Nobel Laureates in Physics Philipp Lenard and Johannes Stark. Supporters of deutsche Physik launched vicious attacks against leading theoretical physicists. While Lenard was retired from the University of Heidelberg, he still had significant influence there. In 1934, Lenard had managed to get Bothe relieved of his directorship of the Physical and Radiological Institute at the University of Heidelberg, whereupon Bothe was able to become the Director of the Institut für Physik of the KWImF, replacing Karl W. Hauser, who had recently died. Ludolf von Krehl, Director of the KWImF, and Max Planck, President of the Kaiser Wilhelm Society (KWG, Kaiser Wilhelm Society, today, the Max Planck Society), had offered the directorship to Bothe to ward off the possibility of his emigration. Fleischmann went with Bothe and worked with him there until 1941.

Bothe was a principal in the German nuclear energy project, also known as the Uranverein (Uranium Club), and Fleischmann was brought into the project through his affiliation with Bothe. Fleischmann worked on isotope separation techniques.

During the period in which deutsche Physik was gaining prominence, which started right after Adolf Hitler came to power in 1933, a foremost concern of many scientists in Germany was to maintain autonomy against political encroachment. Some of the more established scientists, such as Max von Laue, could demonstrate more autonomy than the younger and less established scientists. This was, in part, due to political organizations, such as the Nationalsozialistischer Deutscher Dozentenbund (NSDDB, National Socialist German University Lecturers League), whose district leaders had a decisive role in the acceptance of an Habilitationsschrift, which was a prerequisite to attaining the rank of Privatdozent necessary to becoming a university lecturer. While some with ability joined such organizations out of tactical career considerations, others with ability and adherence to historical academic standards joined these organizations to moderate their activities. This was the case of Wolfgang Finkelnburg. It was in the summer of 1940 that Finkelnburg became an acting director of the NSDDB at Technische Hochschule Darmstadt. As such, he organized the Münchner Religionsgespräche, which took place on 15 November 1940 and was known as the "Munich Synod". The Münchner Religionsgespräche was an offensive against deutsche Physik. While the technical outcome may have been thin, it was a political victory against deutsche Physik. After this, the pendulum began to swing back to standards of achievement being used as a basis for making academic appointments, rather than political considerations. This was the case at the newly established German university in Strasbourg, France.

After the Franco-German Armistice in 1940, the Reichsuniversität Straßburg (Reich's University of Strassburg) in Strasbourg was founded in 1941. The newly founded research institute of the medical school at the Reichsuniversität Straßburg was modeled after the Kaiser-Wilhelm Institut für medizinische Forschung (KWImF, Kaiser Wilhelm Institute for Medical Research; today, the Max-Planck Institut für medizinische Forschung), in Heidelberg; it included institutes for internal medicine, physics, and chemistry. In the physics institute, there were to be two extraordinarius professors in experimental physics and one extraordinarius professor in theoretical physics; Fleischmann and Finkelnburg received the appointments in experimental physics and Carl Friedrich von Weizsäcker received the appointment in theoretical physics. They held these positions until late in 1944, when the Allied military forces liberated Strasbourg from German occupation.

By the time the American Operation Alsos forces had entered Strasboug in late November 1944, von Weizsäcker had already escaped back to Germany. Fleischmann was arrested by the Alsos forces and incarcerated in a local jail until Samuel Goudsmit, chief scientific advisor to Operation Alsos, arrived and made other arrangements for his incarceration. Fleischmann was sent to the United States for interrogation on the Uranverein and to exploit his scientific expertise in nuclear and atomic physics.

After Fleischmann's return to Germany in 1946, he accepted the appointment to the Lehrstuhl für Experimentalphysik (Chair for Experimental Physics) at the University of Hamburg and he became Director of the Physikalische Staatsinstitut (State Physical Institute) and ordinarius professor (ordentlicher Professor) for experimental physics. Initially, due to restrictions by the Allied occupying powers in Germany, nuclear research was forbidden. During this time, Fleischmann developed a new method for determining the optical constants of thin metal layers. As the Cold War developed, this restriction was eased and Fleischmann was able to make the University of Hamburg a center for nuclear physics research. This was done with the able assistance of colleagues such as Erich Bagge, H. Neuert, and Rodolf Kollath.

In 1953, Fleischmann became an ordinarius professor at the University of Erlangen-Nuremberg. He achieved emeritus status in 1969.

In 1957, Fleischmann was a signatory of the manifesto of the Göttinger Achtzehn (Göttingen Eighteen). The 18 eminent scientists were opposed to arming the West German military with tactical nuclear weapons.

== Personal ==
Fleischmann was an accomplished musician and he played both the violin and the piano.

== Internal Reports ==
The following reports were published in Kernphysikalische Forschungsberichte (Research Reports in Nuclear Physics), an internal publication of the German Uranverein. The reports were classified Top Secret, they had very limited distribution, and the authors were not allowed to keep copies. The reports were confiscated under the Allied Operation Alsos and sent to the United States Atomic Energy Commission for evaluation. In 1971, the reports were declassified and returned to Germany. The reports are available at the Karlsruhe Nuclear Research Center and the American Institute of Physics.

- Rudolf Fleischmann Ein mögliches Verfahren zure Isotopentrennung von Uran G-27 (3 July 1940)
- G-343. Excerpts from a document presumably authored by Fleischmann and found in Strassburg by Operation Alsos. Only a rough translation made by Samuel Goudsmit, chief scientific advisor to Alsos, is available.
- R. Flieschemann [in Strassburg] Über den zweckmäßigsten Bau von Trennrohranlagen für kontinuierlichen Betrieb G-350 (ca. 1942)

== Books ==
- Rudolf Fleischmann Einführung in die Physik (Verlag Chemie, 1973)
- Rudolf Fleischmann Spezielle Relativitätstheorie und Längenmessung (Verlag Palm & Enke, 1998)

== Bibliography ==
- Beyerchen, Alan D. Scientists Under Hitler: Politics and the Physics Community in the Third Reich (Yale, 1977) ISBN 0-300-01830-4
- Hentschel, Klaus (editor) and Ann M. Hentschel (editorial assistant and translator) Physics and National Socialism: An Anthology of Primary Sources (Birkhäuser, 1996) ISBN 0-8176-5312-0
- Hoffmann, Dieter Between Autonomy and Accommodation: The German Physical Society during the Third Reich, Physics in Perspective 7(3) 293-329 (2005)
- Goudsmit, Samuel Alsos (Tomash, 1986, second printing). Originally published by Henry Schumann in 1947.
- Landwehr, Gottfried Rudolf Fleischmann 1.5.1903 – 3.2.2002, Nachrufe – Auszug aus Jahrbuch 326-328 2002)
- Pash, Boris T. The Alsos Mission (Award, 1969)
- Powers, Thomas Heinsenberg’s War: The Secret History of the German Bomb (Knopf, 1993)
- Walker, Mark German National Socialism and the Quest for Nuclear Power 1939–1949 (Cambridge, 1993) ISBN 0-521-43804-7
- Weiss, Burghard Der Kernphysiker Rudolf Fleischmann und die Medizin an der Reichsuniversität Straßburg (1941–1944), NTM Zeitschrift für Geschichte der Wissenschaften, Technik und Medizin Volume 14, Number 2, 107-118 (2006). Institutional affiliation: Institut für Medizin- und Wissenschaftsgeschichte, Universität zu Lübeck, Königstraße 42, D-23552 Lübeck, Germany.
