= Neutron backscattering =

Neutron backscattering is one of several inelastic neutron scattering techniques. Backscattering from monochromator and analyzer crystals is used to achieve an energy resolution on the order of a microelectronvolt (μeV). Neutron backscattering experiments are performed to study atomic or molecular motion on a nanosecond time scale.

== History ==
Neutron backscattering was proposed by Heinz Maier-Leibnitz in 1966, and realized by some of his students in a test setup at the research reactor FRM I in Garching bei München, Germany. Following this successful demonstration of principle, permanent spectrometers were built at Forschungszentrum Jülich and at the Institut Laue-Langevin (ILL). Later instruments brought an extension of the accessible momentum transfer range (IN13 at ILL), the introduction of focussing optics (IN16 at ILL), and a further increase of intensity by a compact design with a phase-space transform chopper (HFBS at NIST, SPHERES at FRM II, IN16B at the Institut Laue-Langevin).

== Backscattering spectrometers ==
Operational backscattering spectrometers at reactors include IN10, IN13, and IN16B at the Institut Laue-Langevin, the High Flux Backscattering Spectrometer (HFBS) at the NIST Center for Neutron Research, the SPHERES instrument of Forschungszentrum Jülich at FRM II and EMU at ANSTO.

== Inverse geometry spectrometers ==
Inverse geometry spectrometers at spallation sources include IRIS and OSIRIS at the ISIS neutron source at Rutherford-Appleton, BASIS at the Spallation Neutron Source, and MARS at the Paul Scherrer Institute

== Historic instruments ==
Historic instruments are the first backscattering spectrometer that was a temporary setup at FRM I and the backscattering spectrometer BSS (also called PI) at the DIDO reactor of the Forschungszentrum Jülich (decommissioned).
