= Josef Mattauch =

- Born: 21 November 1895; Ostrava, Kingdom of Bohemia, Austria-Hungary
- Died: 10 August 1976 (aged 80); Klosterneuburg, Austria
- Education: University of Vienna
- Awards: Wilhelm Exner Medal, 1957
- Scientific career
- Workplaces: Max Planck Institute, Kaiser Wilhelm Institute for Chemistry

Josef Mattauch (21 November 1895 – 10 August 1976) was a nuclear physicist and chemist. He was known for the development of the Mattauch-Herzog double-focusing mass spectrometer, for his work on the investigation of isotopic abundances using mass spectrometry, and the determination of atomic weights. Much of his career was spent at the Kaiser Wilhelm Institute for Chemistry (later the Max Planck Institute).

He developed the Mattauch isobar rule ("Isobarenregel") in 1934. He correctly predicted that the last of the rare earth elements, element 61 (later named promethium), would not have stable isotopes.

== Early life ==
Josef Heinrich Elisabeth Mattauch was born 21 November 1895 in Ostrau, Moravia.

Mattauch was educated at the University of Vienna, where he worked with Felix Ehrenhaft. Ehrenhaft believed he had discovered a "sub-electron", smaller than anything measured by Robert Andrews Millikan. Mattauch's results, however, were in agreement with Millikan and not Ehrenhaft. Mattauch completed his PhD degree in Vienna as of 1920.

Through the help of another professor, Mattauch spent 1927–1928 on a Rockefeller Fellowship at Caltech. There he worked with William Smythe on the development of early mass spectrometers.

== Career ==
Mattauch returned to Vienna in 1928 as an unpaid lecturer. There he worked with student Richard F. K. Herzog to develop the Mattauch-Herzog double-focusing mass spectrometer. The first of a new type, it was announced in 1934. His work significantly improved the sharpness and sensitivity of mass spectroscopes. The double-focusing mechanism allowed for the separation and measurement of isotopes that could not be isolated by chemical means, and as such was a major contribution to nuclear physics. Mattauch became an associate professor at the University of Vienna in 1937.

In 1938 Lise Meitner fled Germany after the Nazi occupation of Austria changed her citizenship from Austrian to German, making her subject to the antisemitic Nuremberg Laws of 1935. Otto Hahn invited Mattauch to join the Institute. In 1939, Mattauch succeeded Lise Meitner as head of the department for mass spectroscopy, within the physics department at Kaiser Wilhelm Institute for Chemistry (KWI). A new Mattauch-Herzog mass spectrograph was installed. On 31 July 1941, Mattauch succeeded Lise Meitner as head of the physics department.

Josef Mattauch was appointed an associate professor of nuclear chemistry at the University of Berlin in 1940.

Hahn and Mattauch successfully sought funds for a major expansion for fundamental research in atomic physics. In 1942, the Minerva Project was approved, involving construction of a new building and addition of a cascade generator and particle accelerator. On 1 November 1943 Mattauch advanced to the position of deputy director of the Institute.

On 15 February 1944 and again on 24 March 1944, as part of the Bombing of Berlin in World War II, the Institute suffered severe bombing damage. This included the director's house, one wing of the Institute, Mattauch's new mass spectrograph, and valuable research papers. The Institute was temporarily relocated to Tailfingen (now part of Albstadt) in the Württemberg district, in a textile factory belonging to the Ludwig Haasis company.

On 1 April 1946, in Göttingen in the British zone of occupation, Otto Hahn became president of the Kaiser Wilhelm Society (Kaiser-Wilhelm-Gesellschaft, KWG). As of 1 October 1946, Hahn resigned as director of the Kaiser Wilhelm Institute of Chemistry, leaving Mattauch to manage the Institute. Mattauch officially became director on 31 July 1947. However, Mattauch suffered from tuberculosis and spent much of his time seeking treatment, traveling and working abroad. In 1948, Mattauch was a guest professor at the University of Berne, Switzerland. In his absence, Strassman became acting director. Mattauch and Fritz Strassmann actively supported the proposed appointment of Lise Meitner as head of the physics department of the University of Mainz. Hahn and Strassman asked Meitner to return as director, but she declined their offer.

As of 1949, the Kaiser-Wilhelm-Gesellschaft was renamed the Max-Planck-Gesellschaft (MPG). Also in 1949, the renamed Max Planck Institute for Chemistry moved from Tailfingen to Mainz, Germany. At this time it consisted of two departments: Mass Spectrometry and Nuclear Physics was Mattauch's department, while Nuclear Chemistry was Strassmann's department. Given Mattauch's continued absence, Strassman formally replaced Mattauch as director, becoming the second director of the Max Planck Institute for Chemistry on 28 April 1950. However, restructuring of the Institute by the Senate of the MPG occurred in 1952, changing its research focus. Strassman resigned on 31 March 1953, and moved to the University of Mainz. Mattauch again became the director of the Max Planck Institute for Chemistry. The Institute officially opened new facilities in Mainz in 1956.

In 1957, Mattauch was one of the Göttinger Achtzehn (Göttingen eighteen), a group of eighteen leading nuclear researchers of the Federal Republic of Germany who wrote a manifesto (Göttinger Manifest, Göttinger Erklärung) opposing chancellor Konrad Adenauer and defense secretary Franz-Josef Strauß's move to arm the West German army with tactical nuclear weapons.

Mattauch retired in 1965. Christian Junge (1912-1996) succeeded Josef Mattauch as director of the Institute on October 1, 1968. Josef Heinrich Elisabeth Mattauch died 10 August 1976 in Klosterneuburg, Austria.

== Research ==
Mattauch primarily focused on mass spectroscopy and research into the binding energy of atomic nuclei.

In the early 1930s, at the University of Vienna, Mattauch worked with Richard F. K. Herzog on fundamental aspects of ion optics as they applied to mass spectroscopy. They developed the Mattauch-Herzog double-focusing mass spectrometer. The sector mass spectrometer that they presented in 1934 became known throughout the scientific world as the “Mattauch-Herzog-System”. The Mattauch–Herzog geometry consists of a $\pi / 4\sqrt{2}$ radian electric sector, a drift length which is followed by a right angle ($\pi / 2$) magnetic sector of opposite curvature direction. The entry of the ions sorted primarily by charge into the magnetic field produces an energy focussing effect and much higher transmission than a standard energy filter. The advantage of this geometry is that the ions of different masses are all focused onto the same flat plane, which allows the use of a photographic plate or other flat detector array.

He developed the Mattauch isobar rule ("Isobarenregel") in 1934, which was used to predict the radioactivity of the elements technetium and promethium. According to the rule, "if two adjacent elements on the periodic table have isotopes with the same mass number (isobars), one of the isotopes must be radioactive." Although the rule does not, in fact, hold for all elements, Mattauch was able to correctly predict that the last of the rare earth elements, element 61 (later named promethium), would not have stable isotopes. This led researchers to the realization that element 61 was likely to be extremely rare, and was not likely to be found naturally.

In the 1950s, a period of stability after the war, Mattauch was able to build a strong mass spectrometry program at the Max Planck Institute. Using mass spectrometry he and other researchers were able to determine precise measurements of isotope masses, work that had started in Berlin. Measuring nuclear masses, they were able to precisely determine the nuclear masses of neutrons, protons and chlorine. They also focused on the noble gases, measuring tiny amounts of noble gases from meteorites.

== Decorations and awards ==
- 1957, Wilhelm Exner Medal
- 1964, Austrian Decoration for Science and Art (Österreichisches Ehrenzeichen für Wissenschaft und Kunst)
- 1965, Honorary doctorate from the Vienna University of Technology
