= Wilhelm Walcher =

German experimental physicist

- Born: July 7, 1910; Kaufbeuren
- Died: November 9, 2005 (aged 95); Marburg
- Known for: mass spectrometry, isotope separation
- Scientific career
- Fields: Physics
- Doctoral advisor: Hans Kopfermann
- Doctoral students: Curt Brunnée

Wilhelm Walcher (7 July 1910 in Kaufbeuren – 9 November 2005 in Marburg) was a German experimental physicist. During World War II, he worked on the German nuclear energy project, also known as the Uranium Club; he worked on mass spectrometers for isotope separation. After the war, he was director of the Institute of Physics at the University of Marburg. He was a president of the German Physical Society and a vice president of the German Research Foundation. He helped found the Society for Heavy Ion Research and the German Electron Synchrotron DESY. He was also one of the 18 signatories of the Göttingen Manifest.

== Education ==
From 1929 to 1935, Walcher studied at the Technische Hochschule München (today, the Technical University of Munich) and the Technische Hochschule Berlin (today, the Technische Universität Berlin. At Berlin, he was a teaching assistant to Gustav Hertz, Hans Kopfermann, Wilhelm Heinrich Westphal, and Hans Geiger. In 1933, on the advice of Hertz, he became a member of the Nationalsozialistischer Kraftfahrer Korps (NSKK, National Socialist Motorist Corps). He received his doctorate in 1937, at the Technische Hochschule Berlin, under Kopfermann.

== Career ==
In 1937, Walcher became a teaching assistant to Hans Kopfermann, who had taken an appointment at the Christian-Albrechts-Universität zu Kiel; Walcher was his teaching assistant there until 1942. At Kiel, Walcher developed a mass spectrograph for both isotope separation and determination of the degree of enrichment of uranium samples. From 1940, he worked on the German nuclear energy project, also known as the Uranverein (Uranium Club), under which he worked on two mass spectrometers to determine the composition of isotope mixtures and for neutron-spin analysis

In 1942, Walcher’s Habilitationsschrift was rejected on the basis of “political unreliability.” However, Hans Kopfermann, a principal in the Uranverein, had become the Director of the Second Experimental Physics Institute at the Georg-August University of Göttingen in 1942 and he successfully intervened on Walcher’s behalf so that the Habilitation from the University of Kiel was conferred. From 1942 to 1947, Walcher was a Privatdozent at the University of Göttingen.

From 1947 to 1978, Walcher was an ordentlicher Professor (ordinarius professor) of experimental physics and director of the Physikalischen Institut (Physics Institute) at Philipps-Universität Marburg. He was Rektor (Rector) of the University from 1952 to 1954.

From 1960 to 1961, Walcher was president of the Deutsche Physikalische Gesellschaft. He was the vice president of the Deutsche Forschungsgemeinschaft (DGF, German Research Foundation) from 1961 to 1967.

Walcher was a co-initiator of the Gesellschaft für Schwerionenforschung (GSI, Society for Heavy Ion Research) in Darmstadt and the Deutsches Elektronen-Synchrotron (DESY, German Electron Synchrotron) in Hamburg.

In 1957, Walcher was one of the 18 signers of the Göttinger Manifest, which opposed the rearming of Germany with nuclear weapons.

== Honors ==
Walcher received honors for his contributions to Germany and the German physics community:

- 1975 – Großes Verdienstkreuz (Great Cross of Merit) of the Verdienstorden der Bundesrepublik Deutschland (Order of Merit of the Federal Republic of Germany)
- 1976 – Ehrendoktorwürde der Ruhr-Universität Bochum (Honorary doctorate of the Ruhr-University Bochum)

== Internal Reports ==
The following report was published in Kernphysikalische Forschungsberichte (Research Reports in Nuclear Physics), an internal publication of the German Uranverein. The reports were classified Top Secret, they had very limited distribution, and the authors were not allowed to keep copies. The reports were confiscated under the Allied Operation Alsos and sent to the United States Atomic Energy Commission for evaluation. In 1971, the reports were declassified and returned to Germany. The reports are available at the Karlsruhe Nuclear Research Center and the American Institute of Physics.

- Wilhelm Walcher Bericht über den Stand der in Kiel durchgeführten massenspektroskopischen Arbeiten G-196 (March 1942)

== Books by Walcher ==
- Wilhelm Walcher Praktikum der Physik (Vieweg & Teubner, 1967, 1989, 2006)
- Detlef Kamke and Wilhelm Walcher Physik für Mediziner (Vieweg & Teubner, 1982, 1994, 2004)
- Max Wutz, Hermann Adam, and Wilhelm Walcher Handbuch Vakuumtechnik. Theorie und Praxis (Vieweg Friedr. & Sohn Verlag, 1986, 1989, 1992, 1997, 2004)

== Bibliography ==
- Hentschel, Klaus (Editor) and Ann M. Hentschel (Editorial Assistant and Translator) Physics and National Socialism: An Anthology of Primary Sources (Birkhäuser, 1996)
- Walker, Mark German National Socialism and the Quest for Nuclear Power 1939–1949 (Cambridge, 1993) ISBN 0-521-43804-7
