= Wolfgang Paul =

German physicist (1913–1993)

- Born: 10 August 1913; Lorenzkirch, Saxony, German Empire
- Died: 7 December 1993 (aged 80); Bonn, North Rhine-Westphalia, Germany
- Education: Technical University of Munich; Technische Universität Berlin; University of Göttingen
- Known for: Ion traps Quadrupole mass analyzer
- Awards: Nobel Prize in Physics (1989); UNSW Dirac Medal (1992)
- Scientific career
- Fields: Physics
- Workplaces: University of Bonn; University of Kiel
- Doctoral advisor: Hans Kopfermann

Notes
- He humorously referred to Wolfgang Pauli as his "imaginary part".

Wolfgang Paul (German pronunciation: [ˈvɔlfɡaŋ ˈpaʊ̯l]; 10 August 1913 – 7 December 1993) was a German physicist, who co-developed the non-magnetic quadrupole mass filter which laid the foundation for what is now called an ion trap. He shared one-half of the Nobel Prize in Physics in 1989 for this work with Hans Georg Dehmelt; the other half of the Prize in that year was awarded to Norman Foster Ramsey, Jr.

== Early life ==
Wolfgang Paul was born on 10 August 1913 in Lorenzkirch, Germany. He grew up in Munich where his father was a professor of pharmaceutical chemistry. After the first few years at the Technical University of Munich, he changed to Technische Universität Berlin in 1934 where he finished his Diploma in 1937 at the group of Hans Geiger. He followed his doctorate adviser Hans Kopfermann to the University of Kiel, and after being drafted to the air force, he finished his PhD in 1940 at Technische Universität Berlin.

During World War II, he researched isotope separation, which is necessary to produce fissionable material for use in making nuclear weapons.

== Academic career ==
For several years, he was a private lecturer at the University of Göttingen with Hans Kopfermann. He became a professor of experimental physics at the University of Bonn and stayed there from 1952 until 1993. For two years, from 1965 to 1967, he was director of the Division of Nuclear Physics at CERN. In 1970, he spent some weeks as Morris Loeb lecturer at Harvard University. He lectured in 1978 as distinguished scientist at the FERMI Institute of the University of Chicago and in a similar position at The University of Tokyo. From 1981, he was professor emeritus at the Bonn University.

== Scientific results ==
He developed techniques for trapping charged particles in mass spectrometry by electric quadrupole fields in the 1950s. Paul traps are used extensively today to contain and study ions. He developed molecular beam lenses and worked on a 500 MeV electron synchrotron, followed by one at 2500 MeV in 1965. Later he worked on containing slow neutrons in magnetic storage rings, measuring the free neutron lifetime.

He humorously referred to Wolfgang Pauli as his imaginary part if their surnames were considered as complex numbers.

== Göttingen Manifesto ==
In 1957, Paul was a signatory of the Göttingen Manifesto, a declaration of 18 leading nuclear scientists of West Germany against arming the West German army with tactical nuclear weapons.

== Sons ==
His son Stephan Paul is a professor of experimental physics at the Technical University of Munich. His son Lorenz Paul is a professor of physics at the University of Wuppertal.

== Works ==
- Paul, Wolfgang (1990). "Electromagnetic Traps for Charged and Neutral Particles". Reviews of Modern Physics. 62 (3): 531–540. Bibcode:1990RvMP...62..531P. doi:10.1103/RevModPhys.62.531.
- Paul, Wolfgang; Steinwedel, Helmut (1953). "Ein neues Massenspektrometer ohne Magnetfeld". Zeitschrift für Naturforschung A. 8 (7): 448–450. Bibcode:1953ZNatA...8..448P. doi:10.1515/zna-1953-0710. S2CID 96549388.
