= Viktor Adamsky =

Russian physicist (1923–2005)

- Виктор Адамский
- Born: 30 April 1923; Kiev, Ukrainian SSR, Soviet Union
- Died: 14 December 2005 (aged 82); Sarov, Russia
- Citizenship: Russia (1991–2005); Soviet Union (1923–1991)
- Education: Moscow State University
- Known for: Soviet atomic bomb project Thermonuclear weapon and explosives
- Awards: Lenin Prize; Order of the Red Banner of Labor; Medal "For Labour Valour"
- Scientific career
- Fields: Physics
- Workplaces: VNIIEF
- Thesis: On the RDS-37 (1974)

Viktor Borisovich Adamsky (Note: Also spelled Adamskii) (Russian: Ви́ктор Бори́сович Ада́мский; 30 April 1923 – 14 December 2005) was a Soviet and Russian physicist known for his work on the former Soviet program of nuclear weapons.

== Biography ==
Adamsky was born in Kiev, Ukrainian SSR, Soviet Union, on 30 April 1923. He entered in the Moscow State University but was drafted in the Red Army and served as a radioman in the Battle of Stalingrad during the Eastern Front of the World War II. In 1945, he went to attend the Moscow State University and earned specialist diploma in physics in 1949-1950. He was sent to work in the VNIIEF in Arzamas-16, initially working as an engineer before working as a researcher. In 1974, Adamsky was successful in defending his thesis in physics and earned his Candidate of Sciences (Russian equivalent of PhD) from Moscow State University.

Adamsky, a physicist, participated in development of thermonuclear charges, first being involved in the development of RDS-37— the first Soviet two-stage thermonuclear device. He worked with Vyacheslav Feodoritov in the development of the RDS-220, involved in studies concerning the self-excitation of a thermonuclear reaction occurs at high compressions. In his initial career, he knew little of what it was but understood he would be working on the hydrogen bomb; he was put up in a hotel, then a flat and was finally invited to share part of a cottage with Igor Tamm and Yuri Romanov. He found a collegial spirit amongst his workmates, who were very aware of the importance and personal limitations of their situation. His experience in physics was first practised under the direction of Yakov Zeldovich and Andrei Sakharov. Theoretical development of the RDS-220 began in July 1961 with a design team chosen by Sakharov (who had met with premier Nikita Khrushchev on 10 July). By October a report (authored by Sakharov, Adamsky, Yuri Babayev, Yuri Smirnov and Yuri Trutnev) including the design proposal and calculations had been completed and sent to the design engineers for construction. Under huge political pressure and a strict timetable, the typical mathematical rigour associated with previous nuclear bomb development had been replaced by some omissions and the usage of estimates and approximations. As a result, fellow theoretical physicist Evsei Rabinovich suggested that the design might not work; Sakharov, Adamsky and Feodoritov argued otherwise, but Sakharov did ask the engineers to make some design changes to improve the level of confidence.

Sakharov once visited Adamsky in his office to show him a short story in English by Leo Szilard (the nuclear bomb patent-holder who conceived of nuclear chain reactions) called My Trial as a War Criminal. Szilard's tale of the aftermath of the usage of weapons of mass destruction affected them strongly. Later, both Sakharov and Adamsky provided warnings about the dangers to humanity of nuclear proliferation and the governments behind it.

Two years after the RDS-220 test, Adamsky made a key proposal in a memorandum which it is believed was used to overcome an impasse a few months later during negotiations leading to the Partial Nuclear Test Ban Treaty between the U.S.A., the U.K. and the U.S.S.R. in 1963. As a result of Khruschev's acceptance of Adamsky's proposal (it is not known if he actually read it) the ban was agreed upon in the atmosphere, underwater and outer space. Adamsky is buried in Sarov cemetery.

== Awards ==
- 1962: Lenin Prize
- 1956: Order of the Red Banner of Labor
- 1954: Medal "For Labour Valour"
