= Yuri Trutnev (scientist) =

Soviet physicist (1927–2021)

- Юрий Трутнев
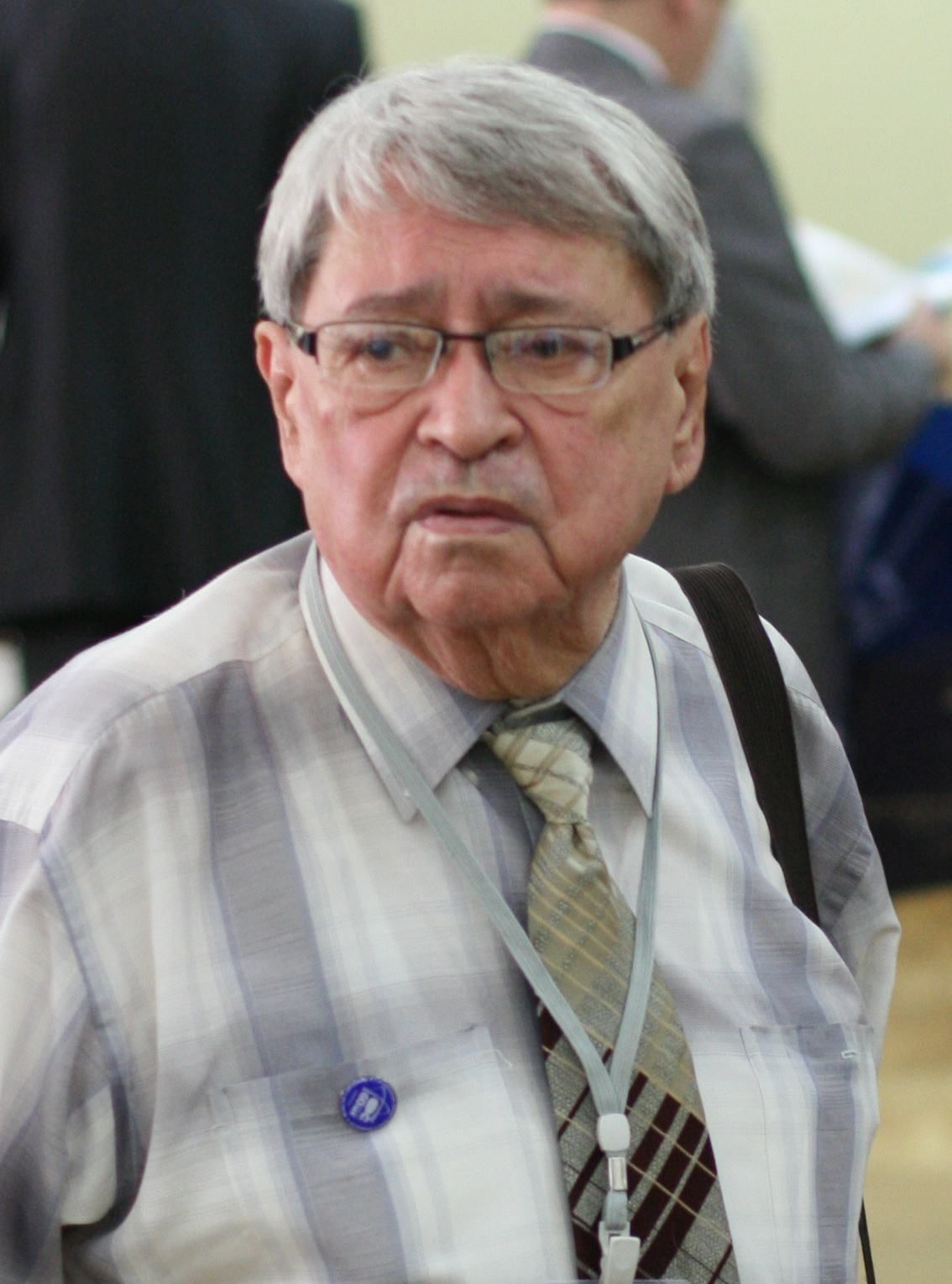
- Trutnev in 2013
- Born: 2 November 1927; Moscow, Russian Soviet Federative Socialist Republic
- Died: 6 August 2021 (aged 93); Sarov, Russia
- Citizenship: Russia
- Education: Leningrad State University
- Known for: Soviet atomic bomb project
- Awards: See honors
- Scientific career
- Fields: Physics
- Workplaces: VNIIEF; National Research Nuclear University MEPhI

Yuri Alexeyevich Trutnev (Russian: Юрий Алексеевич Трутнев; 2 November 1927 – 6 August 2021) was a Russian physicist and a professor of engineering at the National Research Nuclear University MEPhI (Moscow Engineering Physics Institute).

His career in physics spent in the former Soviet program of development of nuclear weapons and was one the designers in the RDS-37 (the Soviet Union's first two-stage thermonuclear device), and the RDS-220 (the largest-ever-yield nuclear device) and many other nuclear charges.

== Career ==
He graduated from the Physics department of the Leningrad State University. In 1951, he was sent to Arzamas-16, also known as KB-11 (English: Design Bureau-11), now the All-Russian Scientific Research Institute of Experimental Physics (VNIIEF), in the closed city of Sarov, Nizhny Novgorod Oblast. He was one of the main authors of the final report concerning the configuration and feasibility calculations of the RDS-37, which was detonated successfully a few months later in November 1955. For this work, he was awarded the Order of Lenin, the first of several national awards. He then worked on 'Project 49', with Yuri Babayev, which involved technical improvements in the implosion of the two-stage charges, which were tested successfully in 1958 and put into production. Andrei Sakharov selected the design team to develop the RDS-220 which included himself, Trutnev, Viktor Adamsky, Yuri Babayev and Yuri Smirnov (Adamsky and Vyacheslav Feodoritov were the project leads). The second and third stages of the RDS-220 were designed principally by Trutnev and Babayev. In 1964, he was appointed head of his department and deputy head of the sector. He was elected a corresponding member of the Russian Academy of Sciences (RAS) the same year. The following year he became head of the sector and in 1966 deputy supervisor. In 1978, he became first deputy supervisor and head of the theoretical department. He became an Academician of the RAS in 1991. From 1993 to 1999, he was first deputy supervisor of VNIIEF.

Trutnev began development of nuclear devices for industrial civilian purposes such as reservoir creation and gas field intensification, and devices which released very low amounts of ionising radiation. Yevgeny Avrorin described Trutnev producing the first "clean" nuclear charge, "a purely thermonuclear reaction" from a solid compound.

Employees at Arzamas-16, including Trutnev, were upset that on a visit by Edward Teller and Siegfried S. Hecker (then director of the Los Alamos National Laboratory) to Russia after the break-up of the USSR, each was photographed in front of a model of the RDS-220 alongside scientists in Snezhinsk. Trutnev insisted that a new photograph be taken of Hecker at VNIIEF in front of a similar model, as it was he and his colleagues at VNIIEF in Sarov who designed the device.

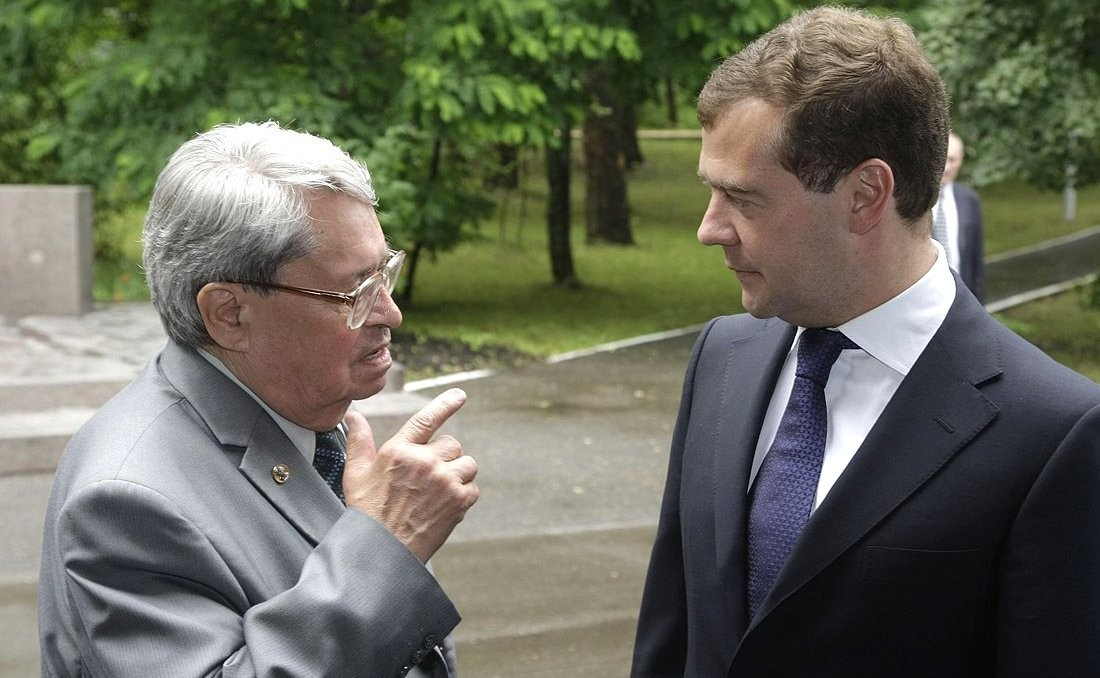
With Dmitry Medvedev, 22 July 2009

Trutnev was the editor-in-chief of the Atomic Science and Technology journal and deputy editor-in-chief of the International Scientific Journal for Alternative Energy and Ecology. He was one of the RAS members who were critical of proposed administrative changes to the RAS by the Russian state in 2013, changes which included the transfer of academic institutions and property (RAS election candidates must now be government-approved and the winner approved by the president).

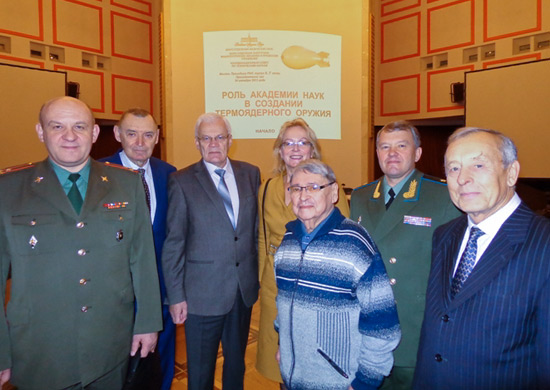
With military people, 24 October 2013

== Awards ==
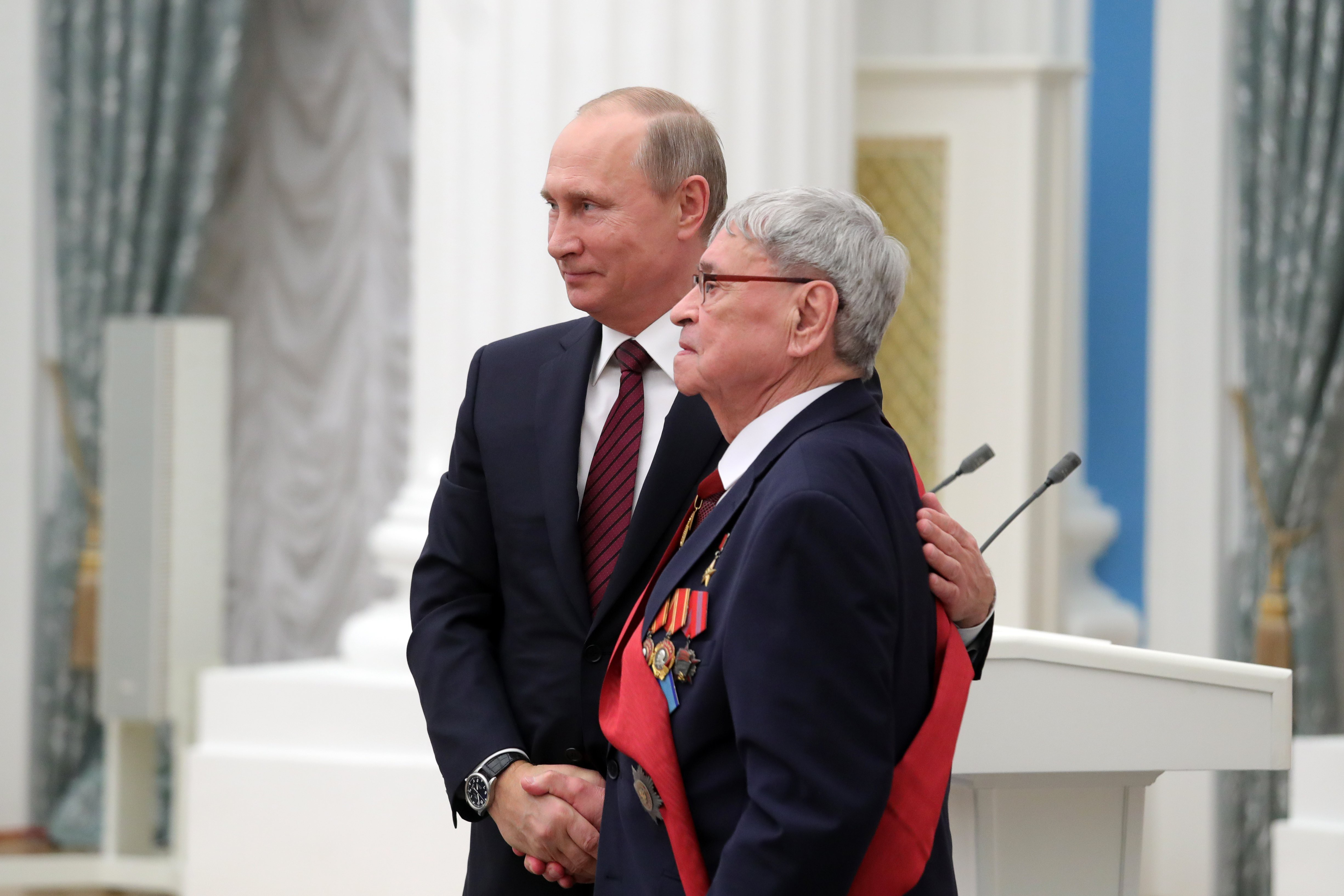
With Vladimir Putin, 15 November 2017

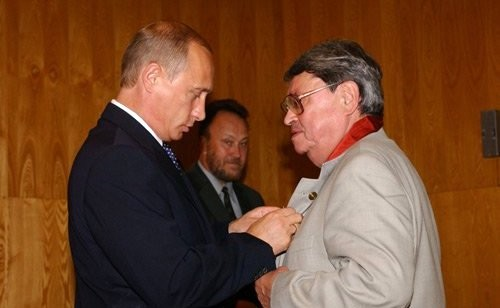
31 July 2003

- 1956, 1962: Order of Lenin.
- 1959: Lenin Prize.
- 1962: Hero of Socialist Labour.
- 1972: Order of the October Revolution.
- 1975, 1987: Order of the Red Banner of Labour.
- 1984: State Prize of the USSR.
- 1998, 2003, 2012, 2017: Order "For Merit to the Fatherland" (3rd class, 2nd class, 4th class, 1st class).
- 2002: Kurchatov Medal.
