= Evsei Rabinovich =

Soviet and Russian physicist (1930–2020)

- Евсей Рабинович
- Born: 6 June 1930; Kyiv, Ukrainian SSR, USSR
- Died: 2019 or 2020 (aged 89–90); Sarov, Russia
- Citizenship: Russia
- Education: Moscow Engineering Physics Institute
- Known for: Soviet atomic bomb project
- Awards: Lenin Prize (1962); Order of the Red Banner of Labour (1956)
- Scientific career
- Fields: Physics
- Workplaces: VNIIEF; National Research Nuclear University MEPhI

Evsei Markovich Rabinovich (Russian: Евсей Маркович Рабинович, 6 July 1930—2020) D.N, was a Russian physicist of Ukrainian origin who participated in the former Soviet program of nuclear weapons, and was one of the designers of the two-stage RDS-37 thermonuclear discharges and its successor, the RDS-220 (also known as Tsar Bomba), the largest ever bomb.

== Education ==
He studied engineering physics at the Moscow Engineering Physics Institute, and was honored with the Doctor of Sciences degree before joining the Soviet program of nuclear weapons in 1954.

== Soviet nuclear weapons programme ==
Rabinovich worked at KB-11 (English: Design Bureau-11), now known as the All-Russian Scientific Research Institute of Experimental Physics, where a significant group of physicists, mathematicians and chemists worked in secret; his work was under the direction of Yakov Zeldovich, a principal physicist (and well-known cosmologist) who was directing research groups at KB-11 and the Institute of Chemical Physics.

During the development of the RDS-220, Rabinovich became concerned that the device would not work and shared his worries with colleagues before raising them with his superiors. His concerns were taken so seriously that after discussion with the project design leads Viktor Adamsky, Vyacheslav Feodoritov and chief weapons designer Andrei Sakharov, all of whom provided counter-arguments, Sakharov altered the design of the bomb to reduce the margins of error in calculating the processes which had vexed Rabinovich.

== Later career ==
He authored papers on electron-positron pair production and (with Zeldovich) statistical formulae in a Fermi gas. Later, he became a deputy director of the Wave Research Centre in Moscow, an offshoot of the Lebedev Physical Institute of the Russian Academy of Sciences.
