= Vyacheslav Feodoritov =

Russian physicist

- Феодоритов, Вячеслав Петрович
- Born: Vyacheslav Petrovich Feodoritov; 28 February 1928; Sasovo, Ryazan Oblast in Soviet Union (now Sasovo, Ryazan in Russia)
- Died: 2 January 2004 (aged 75); Sarov, Russia
- Resting place: Sarov, Russia
- Citizenship: Russia
- Education: Moscow State University
- Known for: Soviet atomic bomb project
- Awards: Honored Scientist of the Russia; USSR State Prize; Order of the Red Banner of Labor
- Scientific career
- Fields: Physics
- Workplaces: VNIIEF
- Thesis: (1993)

Vyacheslav Petrovich Feodoritov (Russian: Вячесла́в Петро́вич Феодори́тов)(28 February 1928 – 2 January 2004), k.N, was a Russian physicist in the former Soviet program of nuclear weapons. He was a co-designer of the first two-stage Soviet thermonuclear device, the RDS-37, and became a chief of laboratory at Arzamas-16, now known as the All-Russian Scientific Research Institute of Experimental Physics.

== Early life and career ==
Feodoritov was born in Sasovo, Ryazan Oblast, 319 km south-east of Moscow. He graduated with honours from the Faculty of Physics and Technology of Moscow State University in 1952. Straight from graduation, he became a researcher in the theoretical sector known as KB-11 in Arzamas-16, which was based in the closed city of Sarov, working under Yakov Zel'dovich. Employees were only allowed leave on officially sanctioned or organised days off work, on trips such as for hunting or fishing. Feodoritov became lost on one such trip and - fearful for his future - was aided in his return by locals (who were well aware of the function of Sarov), later finding from his boss (Andrei Sakharov) that the KGB had been informed and had organised a search party. He worked in this secret institution until the end of his life, starting as a senior laboratory assistant and progressing through to engineer, researcher, head of the research group, senior research fellow and chief of laboratory.

He took part in the testing of nuclear weapons and was the scientific lead in a number of tests. Along with his project lead, Yevgeny Zababakhin, and in addition to his work on the RDS-37, he worked on calculations for the core part of the RDS-6s bomb, the first Soviet thermonuclear weapon, and also worked on a design which became the first Soviet serial tactical nuclear weapon, RDS-4. Both devices were successfully completed in 1953. For this work he received the Stalin Prize, third degree and the Medal "For Labour Valour". He also worked on civilian nuclear projects. For further significant theoretical work and following successful weapons testing in 1954 and 1955, leading to a new generation of Soviet nuclear weaponry, he was awarded the Order of the Red Banner of Labour. In 1956, he originated further design improvements which helped lead to a new direction in Soviet nuclear weapons. He was part of the team which developed the RDS-220 thermonuclear weapon, the largest ever tested. With German Goncharov, he worked on the construction scheme of these types of weapons, and with Sakharov he analysed the efficiency of the theoretical model of the RDS-220. He received his PhD in Physical and Mathematical Sciences in 1968. For his role in the projects to develop nuclear weapons he was awarded the State Prize of the USSR in 1973. Later in his career, Feodoritov was one of the compilers of the Atomic Project of the USSR, specifically Documents and materials. Volume II. Atomic bomb. 1945 - 1954 Book 1 (published in 1999). He was honoured for his contributions as a scientist in 2000.

In his personal life, he was admired for his humanity and cordiality and was the chair of the parent committees throughout his children's education. He was regarded as a Father Frost figure, referred to as "Uncle Slava" by friends of his children and the children of colleagues.

== Awards ==
- Twice laureate of the USSR State Prize/Stalin Prize (1953,1973).
- Honoured scientist of the Russian Federation (2000)
