= Yevgeny Zababakhin =

Soviet physicist (1917–1984)

- Евгений Забабахин
- Born: Zababakhin, Yevgeny Ivanovich (Забабахин, Евгений Иванович); 16 January 1917; Moscow, Russia
- Died: 27 December 1984 (aged 67); Chelyabinsk-70, Russia in Soviet Union
- Citizenship: Soviet Union
- Education: Zhukovsky Air Force Engineering Academy
- Known for: Soviet program of nuclear weapons
- Awards: Lenin Prize (1958); Order of Lenin (1953, 1949); Stalin Prize (1953, 1949); Hero of Socialist Labor (1953); Order of Red Banner of Labor (1951)
- Scientific career
- Fields: Physics
- Workplaces: VNIIEF KB-11; VNIITF NII-1011

Yevgeny Ivanovich Zababakhin (Russian: Евгений Иванович Забабахин; 16 January 1917 – 27 December 1984), was a Soviet physicist who was one of the senior chief designers of nuclear discharges of the Soviet nuclear weapons.

Amongst many others, he was a senior officer in the Soviet Air Forces and had been involved in the first Soviet nuclear weapon, the RDS-1, and the design of the first Soviet two-stage hydrogen bomb (RDS-37).

== Life and career ==
Zababakhin was born in Moscow. After completing seven-year school in 1931, he joined the Moscow College of Food Industry. The focus of this technical college changed to the manufacture of ball bearings. He graduated in 1936, and was sent to the Sharikopodshipnik factory, eventually becoming the senior foreman operating lathes. In 1938, he enrolled at the Moscow State University to study physics before leading a Komsomol platoon from 1941, building defences against Nazi Germany in Roslavl, Smolensk Oblast. In September that year he was sent as a new recruit to the Air Force Engineering Academy in Zhukovsky. He graduated with honours in 1944 – as a captain – and went to the department of ballistics, teaching. He submitted a postgraduate thesis on converging shock waves in 1947. That year, he was also elected a deputy of the Supreme Soviet of the Soviet Union (until 1952) and took part in the 13th, 14th and 15th congresses of the Communist Party. Professor D.A. Ventsel, his dissertation supervisor, recommended that he go to the Institute of Chemical Physics as an assistant in Yakov Zeldovich's laboratory, part of the Soviet atomic bomb project. Zel'dovich noted the 30-year-old as a modest and shy, but talented and strong-willed. He saw how close the dissertation was to his own laboratory's work – his notes were classified and destroyed by the authorities, but Zababakhin welcomed an able physicist.

He was transferred to the closed city of Sarov, Nizhny Novgorod to KB-11 ('Design Bureau-11', also known as Arzamas-16 or the 'Installation'), the new centre of Soviet nuclear weapons design. After the test of the first Soviet nuclear weapon in 1949, the RDS-1, he received the first of his national awards, the Order of Lenin and the Stalin Prize, for his contribution. His original theoretical work helped to produce the next device, the RDS-2, tested in 1951 and improvements and primary theoretical work in many further devices including the first Soviet hydrogen bomb, the RDS-37. Under Igor Kurchatov he completed his thesis to become a doctor of physical and mathematical sciences.

Soviet authorities instigated a second weapons design installation at Chelyabinsk-70 (now Snezhinsk) in 1955, NII-1011 (Scientific Research Institute-1011), with Zababakhin as head of the theoretical department and deputy supervisor. Developments here led to the first of the Soviet army's weaponised nuclear charges in 1957. Further weapons were created here. He was elected a corresponding member of the Academy of Sciences in 1958 and he became the supervisor of NII-1011 in 1960, a role he remained in for the rest of his life.

In Autumn 1962, Andrei Sakharov, who had been supervising Boris Kozlov's team producing a hydrogen bomb for atmospheric testing at KB-11, considered there was no justifiable reason for a similar device created by Zababakhin's team at NII-1011. Concerned that the fallout would eventually kill thousands of people unnecessarily, he appealed first to Yulii Khariton (in charge of Soviet weapons design, who thought the appeal was invidious and divisive considering poor relations between the groups), then to premier Nikita Khrushchev (who said he felt ill), then to Efim Slavsky, minister of medium machine building (who initially supported him). Sakharov visited NII-1011. Zababakhin delivered a stiff response, insisting that his device must be tested. Sakharov shouted that this was tantamount to murder, but Zababakhin and his team were unmoved. Both devices were detonated, Zababakin's one first.

He performed experiments in the usage of nuclear charges for civilian enterprises with Boris Litvinov such as extinguishing gas flares and ore and fossil fuel production. In 1968, he was elected a full member of the Academy of Sciences. He supervised many graduate and postgraduate students of Science. His final military rank, gained in 1977, was lieutenant-general-engineer of the air force.

He died suddenly at work in Chelyabinsk-70.

== Awards and legacy ==
- 1949: Order of Lenin, Stalin Prize 2nd degree.
- 1951: Order of the Red Banner of Labour, Stalin Prize 1st degree.
- 1953: Hero of Socialist Labour and Hammer & Sickle Gold Medal, further Order of Lenin, further Stalin Prize 1st degree.
- 1958: Lenin Prize.
- 1967: Honorary Citizen of Snezhinsk.
- 1976: Diploma of Honour of the Chelyabinsk Regional Committee of the Communist Party of the Soviet Union.
- 1984: M.V.Keldysh gold medal.

The following were named in his honour:

- The Zababakhin Scientific Readings, a conference about high-energy-density Physics was first held in 1992.
- A prize for the best work from young scientists working at VNIITF was established in 1998.
- The All-Russian Scientific Research Institute of Technical Physics (RFNC-VNIITF), (formerly NII-1011) was prefixed with E.I. Zababakhin in 1999.
