= German Goncharov =

Soviet/Russian nuclear physicist, engineer and mathematician (1928-2009)

- Герман Арсеньевич Гончаров
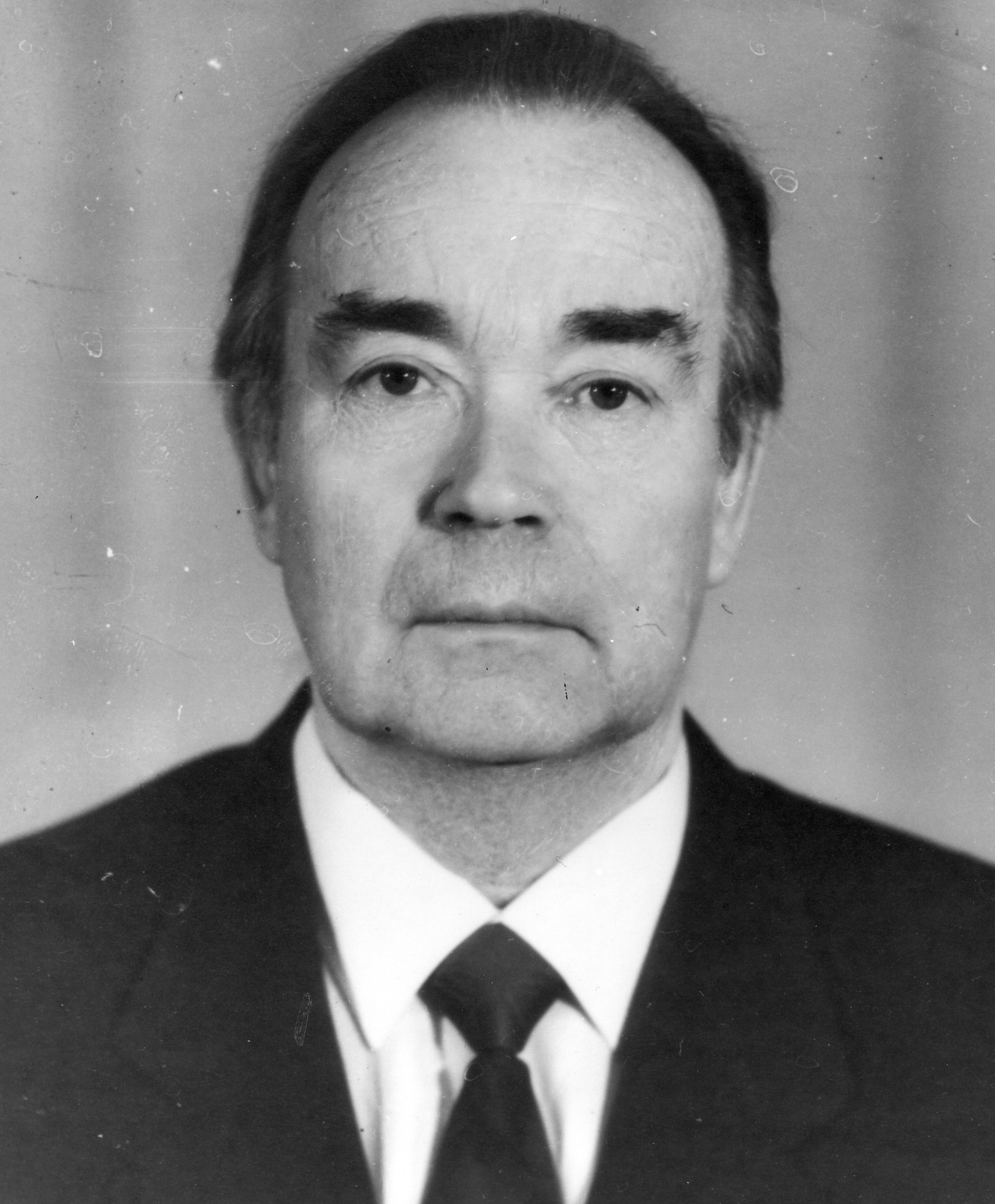
- Born: July 28, 1928; Kalinin, RSFSR, Soviet Union (Now Tver, Tver Oblast, Russia)
- Died: September 7, 2009 (aged 81); Moscow, Russia
- Resting place: Troyekurovskoye Cemetery
- Education: Moscow State University
- Known for: Soviet program of nuclear weapons
- Awards: State Prize of Russian Federation; Honored Inventor of the USSR; Order of Lenin; Hero of Socialist Labor; Lenin Prize; Order of the Red Banner of Labour
- Scientific career
- Fields: Physics
- Workplaces: All-Russian Scientific Research Institute of Experimental Physics

German Arsenyevich Goncharov (Russian: Герман Арсеньевич Гончаров; 8 July 1928 – 7 September 2009) was a Russian physicist who worked for the Soviet program of nuclear weapons. From 1952 to 2004, Goncharov developed and tested Soviet thermonuclear weapons; from 1967 to 2004, he led a theoretical department at the Soviet nuclear research facility at Arzamas-16.

== Early life and education ==
Goncharov was born in Kalinin (reverted to Tver in 1991), 160 km northwest of Moscow. From 1941 to 1943, he was evacuated with his family to the Kuybyshev region (reverted to Samara in 1991). In 1946 he graduated from high school in Kalinin, winning a gold medal.

He enrolled at the Moscow State University in the Faculty of Mechanics and Mathematics – without taking any entrance exams – and in 1947 transferred to the Physics and Technical Faculty, from which he graduated in 1952. The Faculty was at Laboratory No. 3 of the USSR Academy of Sciences (now the Institute for Theoretical and Experimental Physics), under the direction of Abram Alikhanov. While here, he trained in mountaineering in the Caucasus.

== Career ==
In June 1952, Goncharov was assigned to work in the department of experimental nuclear reactors at KB-11, usually referred to as Arzamas-16 and now known as All-Russian Scientific Research Institute of Experimental Physics (VNIIEhF), in Sarov, Nizhny Novgorod region. It was a closed entity, constructed by slave labour from a gulag next to the nuclear facility. In his first year, he was deeply affected by the fact he was not allowed to leave, even to visit his parents, but kept himself distracted by the work. He worked as a senior laboratory assistant and from September 1952 as an engineer. In the same year, Goncharov was sent to work in the theoretical department of KB-11 (where Andrei Sakharov was departmental head) in Theoretical Sector 1 under Igor Tamm; there he took part in work on the first Soviet thermonuclear weapon, RDS-6s, tested at the Semipalatinsk Test Site on 12 August 1953. In September 1953, Goncharov transferred to the post of staff member of the theoretical department.

He was a co-author of a detailed feasibility study undertaken by a team in 1954 and 1955, involving the theory, design and calculations of the next-generation RDS-37 device, an air-delivered two-stage thermonuclear bomb which was detonated in 1956: in the first stage, x-ray radiation was produced from a primary nuclear charge; in the second stage the radiation compressed a thermonuclear core resulting in a fusion reaction. The development of this more-efficient and more-powerful Soviet thermonuclear weapon was galvanized by reports of American success with a high-yield device on 1 March 1954, the first of the Castle Bravo tests. The design was what Sakharov referred to as "the third idea" which he'd originally mulled over in 1949 (the two-stage model was initiated by Stanislaw Ulam; an original patent application for the invention was submitted by Klaus Fuchs and John von Neumann who were employed at Los Alamos in May 1946). For this work, Goncharov was awarded the Order of the Red Banner of Labour in 1956. In 1958, his co-design of a further improved device was tested and then put into production. Between 1959 and 1961, he developed original technical ideas, later credited to him as inventions, which were included in all further Soviet nuclear devices, and he co-designed and was involved in the testing several new bombs. He was involved in the design of the principal physical scheme of the RDS-220 bomb, 'Tsar Bomba', the largest-ever nuclear device. For his creative efforts in the work from 1959, he received the Lenin Prize in 1962.

Goncharov proposed methods of measuring the power of underground nuclear tests in 1963. In 1965, using his theoretical results, he suggested a new direction for the design of Soviet thermonuclear weapons of megatonne yields. The first successful test of these improved weapons was conducted in 1966, using his measurement scheme, in tunnels at Novaya Zemlya. This generation of weapons went into mass production and was put into service with the USSR on land and sea-based missiles. Goncharov was appointed to the post of head of the theoretical department of KB-11 in 1967, a position he held until 2004. He officially became a doctor of physical and mathematical sciences in 1973 and a professor in 1995.

In the period from 1955 to 1983, Goncharov participated in ten aerial and underground nuclear tests at Semipalatinsk, Novaya Zemlya and Azgir, during most of which time he was deputy head of scientific research or a member of the State Commission. In his later years, he studied and wrote about the history of the Soviet nuclear industry and the development of the nuclear arms race: he compiled the multivolume collection of archival documents "The Atomic Project of the USSR. Documents and materials." He was the principal figure in the declassification of Soviet archives on nuclear weapons under Boris Yeltsin. Goncharov worked as chief research officer of the Institute of Theoretical and Mathematical Physics of VNIIEhF from 2002.

He died on 7 September 2009 in Moscow and was buried at the Troyekurovskoye Cemetery.

== Awards ==
- Order of the Red Banner of Labour (1956)
- Medals of the USSR (1970, 1985) and the Russian Federation (1996)
- Lenin Prize (1962)
- Medal for valorous work on the 100th anniversary of Lenin's birth (1970)
- Hero of Socialist Labour (1971)
- Order of Lenin (1971)
- Honoured Inventor of the USSR (1985)
- Medal of the Federation of Cosmonautics of the Russian Federation (1992)
- Honorary Veteran VNIIEF (1997)
- Honoured Scientist of the Russian Federation (1999)
- Veteran of Nuclear Energy and Industry (1999)
- State Prize of the Russian Federation (2003)
- I.V. Kurchatov badge, 1st degree, of the Federal Atomic Energy Agency and Medal for Services in Nuclear Security of the Ministry of Defence of the Russian Federation (2008)
