= Yevgeny Avrorin =

Russian theoretical physicist

- Евгений Аврорин
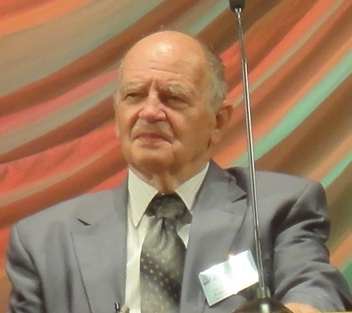
- Avrorin in 2014
- Born: 11 July 1932; Leningrad, Soviet Union (Present day Saint Petersburg, Russia)
- Died: 9 January 2018 (aged 85); Chelyabinsk, Russia
- Citizenship: Russia
- Education: Moscow State University
- Known for: Soviet atomic bomb project
- Awards: Lenin Prize (1987); Order of the Red Banner of Labor (1956)
- Scientific career
- Fields: Physics
- Workplaces: VNIIEF
- Thesis: RDS-37 (1974)

Yevgeny Nikolayevich Avrorin (Russian: Евгений Николаевич Aврорин, 11 July 1932– 9 January 2018), D.N, was a Russian physicist whose career was spent in the former Soviet program of nuclear weapons.

== Biography ==
Avrorin was born in Leningrad, Soviet Union (now Saint Petersburg in Russia), on 11 July 1932. In 1949, he went to study physics at the Leningrad University and later the University of Kharkiv in Ukraine. In 1952, his family return to Moscow and he went to attend the Moscow State University, and graduate with specialist degree in physics in 1954–55. In 1956, he began preparing his thesis based on RDS-37 studies and was awarded the Doktor Nauk (Russian PhD) on 7 March 1974.

Avrorin was directed to KB-11 ('Design Bureau-11), now called All-Russian Scientific Research Institute of Experimental Physics (RFNC-VNIIEF)) in the closed city of Sarov, Nizhny Novgorod region. There he worked on the Soviet hydrogen bomb programme. In 1955, he joined the new NII-1011 (Research Institute-1011, presently the All-Russian Scientific Research Institute of Technical Physics (RFNC-VNIITF)) at another closed city, Snezhinsk (or Chelyabinsk-70). In 1956 and 1957, he performed unique experiments to find out why the RDS-37 exploded fractionally before modelled expectations, a result which implied a lack of knowledge of materials and conditions. During remainder of his career there, he became Head of the Theoretical Physics Department in 1964, the Head of Theoretical Physics Division in 1974 and the Scientific Director in 1985, a role he retained until 2007. From 1996 to 1998, he was also the overall Director.

In addition to his work on many nuclear weapons, he was also known for investigating nuclear explosives for civilian usage (e.g. potentially for mining copper), device designs with very low radiation output and deuterium power engineering. He wrote about the modern challenges to the closed cities whose industries are (largely) no longer required since the dissolution of the Soviet Union. He became the chair of the Snezhinsk branch of the Russian Pugwash committee and was involved in international discussions about science diplomacy and confidence-building for international security.

He died after a long illness.

== Awards ==
- 1956: Order of the Red Banner of Labour
- 1987: Order of Lenin
- 1988: Veteran of Labour
- 1997: 300th Anniversary of the Russian Fleet medal
- 1999: V.P. Makeyev Prize
- 1999, 2006: Order For Service to Homeland (3rd class, 2nd class)
- 2012: Demidov Prize
- 2013: Kurchatov Medal
