= Yuri Romanov =

Yuri Romanov may refer to:

- Yuri Romanov (boxer)
- Yuri Romanov (physicist)
