= Yuri Babayev =

Soviet physicist (1928–1986)

- Бабаев, Юрий Николаевич
- Born: May 21, 1928; Moscow, Soviet Union (present day, Moscow, Russia)
- Died: October 6, 1986 (aged 58); Moscow, Soviet Union
- Resting place: Kuntsevo Cemetery
- Siglum: Yu.N
- Citizenship: Soviet Union
- Education: Moscow State University
- Known for: Soviet atomic bomb project
- Awards: State Prize of Russia (2000); Hero of Socialist Labor (1962); Lenin Prize (1959); Stalin Prize (1953)
- Scientific career
- Fields: Physics
- Workplaces: VNIIEF

Yuri Nikolayevich Babayev (Russian: Юрий Николаевич Бабаев; 21 May 1928 – 6 October 1986), k.N, was a Soviet physicist who spent a long career in the former Soviet program of nuclear weapons, and known as one of the principles who designed the Tsar Bomba, the largest-ever nuclear weapon.

== Early life ==
He was born in Moscow. His family was evacuated during the battles of the Eastern Front (World War II), first to Chelyabinsk then to Leninabad (now Khujand). He did well at school despite the hardships.

He graduated with honours from the faculty of Physics of Moscow State University in 1950. He entered the Soviet weapons programme as one of its youngest scientists, a senior laboratory assistant in Andrei Sakharov's group at Arzamas-16 (also known as KB-11), now known as All-Russian Scientific Research Institute of Experimental Physics (VNIIEF), in Sarov, Nizhny Novgorod region. In 1953, he received the Stalin Prize for his part in the work to develop the Soviet union's first thermonuclear weapon, the RDS-6 which was detonated in 1953; this was the first of several state awards for his work advancing nuclear weapons. With fellow physicist Yuri Trutnev, he proposed a new design in 1955 for a two-stage thermonuclear device with much-improved features, followed by theoretical development and finally completion in 1958. He frequently took part in testing weapons he had helped to develop. He received his Ph.D. in nuclear engineering in 1960. In 1962, he became a doctor of technical sciences and senior research worker. In 1964 he was promoted to head of his department and deputy head of VNIIEF.

His work also encompassed development of low-radiation-yield nuclear charges for civilian purposes – for example to make reservoirs – and nuclear-pumped lasers. He was also interested in the effects of radiation on humans and the environment. Many scientists were trained under his direction as Chair of the Academic Council at KB-11. He was elected to the Soviet Academy of Sciences in November 1968.

He was buried at Kuntsevo Cemetery in Moscow.

== Awards ==
- 1953: Stalin Prize.
- 1956 & 1962: Order of the Red Banner of Labour.
- 1959: Lenin Prize.
- 1962: Hero of Socialist Labour & Order of Lenin.
- 1975: Medal "For Labour Valour".
- 2000: (posthumously) State Prize of the Russian Federation.
