= Sarovo =

Sarovo may refer to:

- Sarov Airport
- Sarovo, Croatia, a village near Generalski Stol
