= Yuri Romanov (physicist) =

Russian physicist

- Born: Yuri Aleksandrovich Romanov; 17 June 1926; Moscow, Russian SFSR, Soviet Union
- Died: 1 November 2010 (aged 84); Sarov, Russia
- Citizenship: Russia
- Education: Moscow State University; Moscow Aviation Institute
- Known for: Soviet atomic bomb project
- Awards: Lenin Prize (1958); Order of the Red Banner of Labour (1952)
- Scientific career
- Fields: Physics
- Workplaces: VNIIEF; VNIITF

Yuri Aleksandrovich Romanov (Russian: Юрий Александрович Романов; 17 June 1926 – 1 November 2010) was a Russian physicist who spent his career in the former Soviet program of nuclear weapons.

== Biography ==
He was born in Moscow into a family with a strong engineering background. He went to school No.64 in Moscow in 1933. In 1941, he was evacuated to the Ural Mountains with his mother and sister. He passed the external examinations for 10th grade in 1942 and began a correspondence course of the Moscow State University in Sverdlovsk Oblast. On his return to Moscow in 1943, he joined the motor faculty of the Moscow Aviation Institute, while continuing his University studies. He moved to the engineering and physical faulty of the Moscow Mechanical Institute of Munitions as a third-year student. In 1947, he graduated with honours from his Moscow State University course. The following year he entered postgraduate study under Igor Tamm.

On 10 June 1948, Tamm headed a new group of theorists which included Andrei Sakharov, Vitaly Ginzburg, Semyon Belenky and Romanov. They followed up Sakharov's ideas for a new thermonuclear weapon and went to KB-11 (now the All-Russian Scientific Research Institute of Experimental Physics) in the closed city of Sarov, Nizhny Novgorod. He started as a junior researcher, then senior, then head of department. In 1952, he received a degree in Physical and Mathematical Sciences with a thesis on kinetic processes of neutrons. This work on neutrons and efficiency continued, along with calculations on nuclear reaction kinetics and energy release of the Soviet Union's first thermonuclear weapon, the RDS-6, tested in 1953; for this he was awarded the Stalin Prize, the first of several awards. He was a leading developer of the RDS-37 - the first Soviet two-stage thermonuclear weapon - most specifically concerned with the power output. Romanov transferred to the new Scientific Research Institute-1011 as head of the theoretical department in 1955. Two years later, his team had developed a new megatonne-yield bomb design. He gained a Ph.D. in Physical and Mathematical Sciences in 1958 and was appointed to professorship of theoretical physics in 1962.

From the early 1960s, from his own initial ideas, Romanov supervised many underground nuclear irradiation experiments to evaluate the effects of nuclear explosions on equipment in space. He returned to KB-11 in 1967 as deputy supervisor and, in 1969, head of the theoretical sector 2. He remained there for nearly three decades, working on anti-missile defence and became chief scientific officer. He was a member of a number of commissions and committees which assessed theses and awarded prizes. In addition to his nuclear weapon and defence research, he wrote papers on the quasilinear theory of plasma turbulence, cosmic plasmas, gravitational spinors, laser-driven thermonuclear fusion and long-range fields.

Amongst his hobbies, he enjoyed playing chess and piano (particularly Chopin and Beethoven). He was also known for writing amusing poetic portraits of friends and colleagues.

He died in Sarov.

== Awards and honors ==
- Stalin Prize, 2nd class (1953)
- Two Orders of the Red Banner of Labour (1953, 1956)
- Lenin Prize (1958)
- Hero of Socialist Labour (1961)
- Order of Lenin (1961)
- Order of the October Revolution (1971)
- USSR State Prize (1975)
- Order "For Merit to the Fatherland", 3rd class (1997)
- Honoured Scientist of the Russian Federation (2001)
