= Venedikt Dzhelepov =

Soviet physicist (1913–1999)

- Венедикт Джелепов
- Born: 12 April 1913; Moscow, Russian Empire
- Died: 12 March 1999 (aged 85); Dubna, Moscow Oblast, Russia
- Education: Leningrad Industrial Institute (1937)
- Awards: Stalin Prize (twice 1951 and 1953)
- Scientific career
- Fields: Nuclear physics
- Workplaces: Joint Institute for Nuclear Research

Venedikt Petrovich Dzhelepov (Russian: Венедикт Петрович Джелепов; April 12, 1913 – March 12, 1999) was a Soviet physicist.

== Biography ==
He graduate Leningrad Industrial Institute. In 1939 he started working with Igor Kurchatov on the first in Europe cyclotron in the Radium Institute. The joint researches with Kurchatov determined Dzhelepov's entire further career.

In August 1943, Dzhelepov joined the group of the first staff members of Laboratory No. 2 which is now known as the Kurchatov Atomic Energy Institute for solving uranium problem. In 1948 Kurchatov appointed Dzhelepov deputy director of the new laboratory formed in Dubna (later became the Institute for Nuclear Problems within the USSR Academy of Sciences. He held this position in 1948-1956.

Later he was appointed director of Laboratory for Nuclear Problems at Joint Institute for Nuclear Research in Dubna (1956-1988). Since 1989 he was its honorary director.

== Awards ==
- Stalin Prize (twice 1951 and 1953)
- Order of Lenin (1951)
- Order of the October Revolution (1983)
- Order of the Red Banner of Labour (twice 1962 and 1974)
- Order of Friendship (1996)
- Kurchatov Gold Medal (1986)

== Memory ==
- Laboratory of Nuclear Problems of Joint Institute for Nuclear Research (JINR) created by Venedikt Dzhelepov now bears his name
- In Dubna there is a monument established showing the outdoor meeting of Dzhelepov and Bruno Pontecorvo
- One of the Dubna streets is named after Dzhelepov
