= Kurchatov Medal =

Soviet award for achievement in nuclear physics

The Kurchatov Medal, or the Gold Medal in honour of Igor Kurchatov is an award given for outstanding achievements in nuclear physics and in the field of nuclear energy. The USSR Academy of Sciences established this award on February 9, 1960 in honour of Igor Kurchatov and in recognition of his lifetime contributions to the fields of nuclear physics, nuclear energy and nuclear engineering.

In the USSR, the Kurchatov Medal award was given every three years starting in 1962. Honorarium was included as part of the award through 1989. Later in Russia, the Kurchatov Gold Medal award has been resumed, and the medal has been given since 1998.

== Soviet award recipients ==
Source: Russian Academy of Sciences

- 1962: Pyotr Spivak and Yuri Prokoviev
- 1965: Yuriy Prokoshkin, Vladimir Rykalin, Valentin Petruhin and Anatoly Danubians
- 1968: Anatoly Aleksandrov
- 1971: Isaak Kikoin
- 1974: Julii Khariton and Savely Moiseevich Feinberg
- 1977: Yakov Zeldovich and Fyodor Shapiro
- 1980: Isai Izrailevich Gurevich and Boris Nikolsky
- 1981: William d'Haeseleer
- 1983: Vladimir Mostovoy
- 1986: Venedikt Dzhelepov and Leonid Ponomarev
- 1989: Georgy Flyorov and Yuri Oganessian

== Russian awards ==
- 1998: Aleksey Ogloblin
- 2000: Nikolay Dollezhal
- 2003: Yuri Trutnev
- 2008: Oleg Gennadievich Filatov
- 2013: Yevgeny Avrorin
- 2018: Nikolay Evgenievich Kukharkin
- 2023: Ramzan Kadyrov, Evgeny Velikhov and Mikhail Kovalchuk

== See also ==
- Awards and decorations of the Russian Federation
- Medal "For Merit in the Development of Nuclear Energy"
- List of physics awards
