= Yulii Khariton =

Russian physicist and scientist

- Юлий Харитон
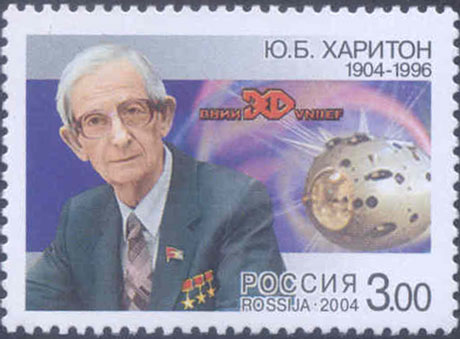
- Khariton on a Russian stamp issued on the 100th anniversary of his birth
- Born: 27 February 1904; Saint Petersburg, Russian Empire
- Died: 18 December 1996 (aged 92); Sarov, Russia
- Siglum: Yu.K
- Citizenship: Russia
- Education: Leningrad Polytechnical Institute, Soviet Union; University of Cambridge, United Kingdom
- Known for: Soviet program of nuclear weapons
- Awards: Hero of Socialist Labour (1949, 1951, 1954); Lenin Prize (1956)
- Scientific career
- Fields: Physics
- Workplaces: Laboratory No. 2 Institute of Chemical Physics
- Thesis: Scintillation produced by alpha-particles (1928)
- Doctoral advisor: Ernest Rutherford
- Other academic advisors: Abram Ioffe

Yulii Borisovich Khariton (Russian: Юлий Борисович Харитон; 27 February 1904 – 18 December 1996) was a Russian physicist who was a leading scientist in the former Soviet program of nuclear weapons.

Since the initiation of the Soviet program of developing the atomic bomb by Joseph Stalin in 1943, Khariton was the "chief nuclear weapon designer" and remained associated with the Soviet program for nearly four decades. In honour of the centennial of his birthday in 2004, his image appeared on a Russian postal stamp by the Russian government.

== Biography ==
=== Family, early life and education ===
Yulii Borisovich Khariton was born in Saint Petersburg, Russian Empire, to a middle-class Russian Jewish family, on 27 February 1904. His father, Boris Osipovich Khariton, was a political journalist, editor, and publisher who had attained a law degree from Kiev University in Ukraine. His father worked for the newspaper Rech, the main organ of the Constitutional Democratic Party, and was a well known figure in the political circles of Russia. After the Russian revolution dismantled the Tsarist autocracy in 1917, Boris Khariton had clashes with the Bolsheviks due to his opposition to Vladimir Lenin's Soviet ideology. His father was exiled to the Baltic states from Russia in 1922 at the age of forty six along with professors and journalists on one of the so-called Philosophers' ships, subsequently working for an emigrant newspaper in Latvia.

His father, Boris Khariton, remained there until Latvia's annexation by the Soviet Union in 1940 and, at the age of sixty-four, was then arrested by the NKVD and sentenced to seven years of forced labour in a Gulag, where he died.

Yulii's mother, Mirra Yakovlevna Burovskaya, was a theatre actress who performed at the Moscow Art Theatre. She left Russia in 1910 due to an illness that had to be treated at the European resort. Yulii was six years old when his mother left him and was taken care by an Estonian woman, hired by his father while in exile in Latvia. Yulii's mother never returned to Russia and divorced his father, only to marry her psychiatrist, Dr. Max Eitingon.

Having lived in Germany, Mirra moved to Tel Aviv in Palestine in 1933, where she remained until her death. She is buried in Jerusalem.

Yulii was forbidden to contact his parents after he had started classified work in the Soviet Union. His travels were highly restricted by the Soviet Union and later by Russia.

Yulii was home schooled by his Estonian housekeeper, hired by his father, who taught him the German language. At the age of eleven, he began attending regular school. In Saint Petersburg, he went to attend a trade school which he completed at the age of fifteen and found work at a local mechanical workshop where he learned how to operate various machinery as a machinist.

In 1920, he enrolled in the Leningrad Polytechnical Institute to study mechanical engineering but later chose to study physics, which he found to be more stimulating. He studied physics under Russian physicists, Abram Ioffe, Nikolay Semyonov, and Alexander Friedmann. Khariton was particularly fascinated with the work of Semyonov whose research used the techniques of physics in chemistry, which Semyonov called "chemical physics.". Khariton's talent was recognised by Semyonov who supported his research project in investigations of the light-emitting ability of phosphorus combined with oxygen, and reported the results in both the German and Russian languages. In 1926, Khariton completed his degree in physics from the Leningrad Polytechnical Institute and ended his research project as he prepared for his first foreign trip to England.

Before departing, he was introduced to Pyotr Kapitsa by Semyonov who asked the latter to help Yulii secure a fellowship at the Cavendish Laboratory in England. In England, Khariton attended the University of Cambridge to do his doctoral in physics under Ernest Rutherford in 1926. At Cambridge, he worked with James Chadwick on investigating the sensitivity of the eye with respect to weak light impulses and alpha radiation. Khariton earned his PhD in 1928 from Cambridge University.

=== Soviet program of nuclear weapons ===
In 1928, Khariton decided to take up the residence in (Germany) to be near his mother, but was appalled and frightened by the political propaganda of the Nazi Party in Germany; therefore returning to Soviet Union while his mother left for Palestine.

In 1931, he joined the Institute of Chemical Physics and eventually headed the explosion laboratory until 1946, working closely with another Russian physicist Yakov Zeldovich, on exothermic chemical chain reactions.

In 1935, he received his doctorate in physical and mathematical sciences. During this period, Khariton and Zeldovich conducted experiments on the chain reactions of uranium. In August 1939, Zeldovich, Khariton and Aleksandr Leipunskii delivered papers on the theoretical process behind nuclear fission chain reactions at a conference in Kharkiv, Ukraine; this was the last pre-war discussion of chain reactions in the USSR.

During World War II, Khariton's knowledge of the physics of explosions was used in experimental studies on Soviet and foreign weaponry, while continuing his leadership of the Institute of Chemical Physics.

Physicist Igor Kurchatov asked Khariton to become part of the Soviet atomic project in 1943, in Laboratory No. 2 of the Russian Academy of Sciences. In May 1945, as part of a team of physicists sent to Berlin to investigate Nazi atomic bomb research, Khariton found 100 tonnes of uranium oxide, which was transported back to Moscow; this reduced development time for domestic plutonium production. After the bombing of Hiroshima and Nagasaki, a Special Committee was established including Kurchatov and Khariton. Khariton was made scientific director of KB-11 (design bureau-11) also known as Arzamas-16 and colloquially as the 'Installation', located in the closed city of Sarov, Nizhny Novgorod Oblast to develop Soviet nuclear weapons (the organisation is now known as the All-Russian Scientific Research Institute of Experimental Physics (VNIIEF). Khariton remained as its scientific director for 46 years. Along with other senior scientists, he was regarded as too important to fly and had his own private train carriage. He was elected as a corresponding member of the Academy of Sciences of the Soviet Union in 1946, and as a full member in 1953.

In 1949, he and Kirill Shchelkin reported to the Special Committee on the progress of the first Soviet nuclear weapon, the RDS-1, which was tested on 29 August that year. He was deferential to political superiors but supported the scientists under him in a politic and diplomatic way. Physicist and departmental head Andrei Sakharov referred to him as being "zealous and unsparing of himself."; he spoke for scientists when they changed their focus to a two-stage nuclear device with initial compression from 1954 (the RDS-37) and supported requests not to detonate the RDS-220 (the largest-ever bomb) because of the calculated number of deaths due to radioactive fallout. He would not support similar requests to halt a duplicate test by a second 'Installation' at Snezhinsk which he felt was divisive, and wouldn't intercede in certain politically-charged personal cases.

His diplomacy meant absorbing criticism and put-downs from political leaders who came and went. KB-11 was sometimes sneered at for having a significant number of staff with Jewish backgrounds, Khariton included. The second Installation under Yevgeny Zababakhin had fewer, and there had been awkward professional relations; it was comically referred to as "Egypt" by politicians, with obvious comparative implications with KB-11: the dining room at KB-11 was termed 'the synagogue.'

== Awards and legacy ==
- Hero of Socialist Labour (1949, 1951, 1954)
- Stalin Prize (1949, 1951, 1953)
- Order of Lenin (1949, 1956, 1962, 1964, 1974, 1984)
- Lenin Prize (1956)
- Order of the October Revolution (1971)
- Order of the Red Banner of Labour (1945)
- Order of the Red Star (1944)
- Gold Medal of I. V. Kurchatov (1974)
- Great Gold Medal of M. V. Lomonosov (1982)

In October 1997 in Sarov, Togliati Street was renamed Akademik Khariton Street in his honour. A bronze bust of him was installed in February 2004 next to the House of Scientists of VNIIEF. In 2004, a Russian stamp was issued to commemorate the 100th anniversary of his birthday.

== See also ==
- Russian Alsos
- Kharitonchik
