= Sarov Monastery =

Monastery in Sarov, Nizhny Novgorod Oblast, Russia

Coordinates: 54°55′34″N 43°19′30″E

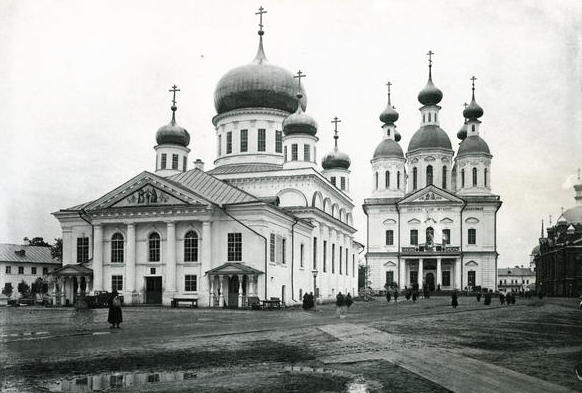
Sarov Monastery, turn of the 20th century

The Monastery of the Dormition of the Mother of God (Russian: Свято-Успенская Саровская пустынь) is located in Sarov, Russia.

The town took its name from being the site of the monastery, next to the Sarov River. In 1664, an Orthodox monk Theodosius first settled on the Sarov hill. The monastery was established for monks in 1706. The hermit and mystic Saint Seraphim of Sarov, one of the most venerated saints of the Russian Orthodox church, was living in Sarov from 1778 to 1833. In 1903, the monastery was visited by Tsar Nicholas II and other members of the imperial family. At that time the monastery had nine churches, including one underground. Around 320 monks lived in the monastery.

In 1927, the monastery was closed, the monks faced Bolshevik repressions, and many were executed. During World War II, the monastery buildings were used as factories for producing rockets for BM-13 "Katyusha" rocket launchers.

It was reactivated in 2006 and reconstruction is taking place. It is under the jurisdiction of the Eparchy of the Russian Orthodox Church of Nizhny Novgorod.
