= Sarov Airport =

Airport in Nizhny Novgorod, Russia

Coordinates: 54.953891°N 43.309672°E

Sarov Саров
- IATA: none; ICAO: none

Summary
- Airport type: Public
- Serves: Sarov
- Location: Sarov
- Elevation AMSL: 528 ft / 161 m
- Interactive map of Sarov

Runways
Direction	Length		Surface
Direction	ft	m	Surface
01/19	8,200	2,500	Concrete

Sarov Airport (also called Mius Airfield; airport code XUDM/ЬУДМ) is an airport in Russia located in the town of Sarov, 4 km (2.5 mi) north of downtown, within the closed city area. It is a mixed use utilitarian airfield with an unusually wide runway for a small airfield of this type. The airport consists of Runway 01/19 (1920m, or 2500m including displaced thresholds) without taxiways, a small airport apron with an adjacent car park, and a small terminal/administration building located 200 meters away from the apron.

Satellite imagery from Google Earth on 2018-04-15 show major runway work underway. An additional image from 2018-09-06 reveals the work is a completely resurfacing, with the prior overruns being included to bring the fully operational length to 2500 Meters. In addition, the image shows substantial work on the apron area, perhaps doubling the former surface area.

This airport was used for experimental aircraft as well as for commercial and government flights to Moscow's Bykovo Airport. Light aircraft such as An-24 were operated on this route. Service was reduced from daily to three times a week before the route was ceased in 2005. There are currently no scheduled commercial flights to Sarov, previously codenamed Arzamas-16, as the town is in a restricted area which the general public cannot enter due to nuclear research facilities within the town.

== See also ==
- Area 51
- Closed city
- List of airports in Russia
