= Tsar Bomba =

Most powerful nuclear weapon ever tested

- Ground-level view of detonation (source: Rosatom State Corporation Communications Department: Rosatom: 20–08–2020 public release)
- Type: Thermonuclear
- Place of origin: Soviet Union

Production history
- Designer: Yulii Khariton; Andrei Sakharov; Viktor Adamsky; Yuri Babayev; Yuri Smirnov; Yuri Trutnev; Yakov Zeldovich
- No. built: 1 operational (2 "prototypes")

Specifications
- Mass: 27,000 kg (60,000 lb)
- Length: 8 m (26 ft)
- Diameter: 2.1 m (6 ft 11 in)
- Detonation mechanism: Barometric sensor
- Blast yield: 50–58 megatons of TNT (210–240 PJ)

The Tsar Bomba (Russian: Царь-бомба; code name: Ivan or Vanya, internal designation: AN602) is the most powerful nuclear weapon or weapon of any kind ever constructed and tested. A project of the Soviet Union, it was a thermonuclear aerial bomb, tested on 30 October 1961 at the Novaya Zemlya site in the country's far north. The bomb yielded the equivalent of 50 megatons of TNT.

The Soviet physicist Andrei Sakharov oversaw the project at Arzamas-16, while the main work of design was by Sakharov, Viktor Adamsky, Yuri Babayev, Yuri Smirnov, and Yuri Trutnev. The project was ordered by First Secretary of the Communist Party Nikita Khrushchev in July 1961 as part of the Soviet resumption of nuclear testing after the Test Ban Moratorium, with the detonation timed to coincide with the 22nd Congress of the Communist Party of the Soviet Union (CPSU).

Tested on 30 October 1961, the test verified new design principles for high-yield thermonuclear charges, allowing nuclear explosives "of practically unlimited power". The bomb was dropped by parachute from a Tu-95V aircraft, and detonated automatically 4,000 metres (13,000 ft) above the cape Sukhoy Nos of Severny Island, Novaya Zemlya, 15 kilometres (8 nautical miles) from Mityushikha Bay, north of Matochkin Strait. Blast data and footage was recorded by a Soviet Tu-16. Both aircraft received radiation flash damage.

The bhangmeter results and other data suggested the bomb yielded around 58 Mt (243 PJ), which was the accepted yield in technical literature until 1991, when Soviet scientists revealed that their instruments indicated a yield of 50 Mt (209 PJ). As they had the instrumental data and access to the test site, their yield figure has been accepted as more accurate. In theory, the bomb would have had a yield over 100 Mt (418 PJ) if it had included the natural uranium tamper which featured in the design but was replaced with lead in the test to reduce radioactive fallout. As only one bomb was built to completion, that capability has never been demonstrated. The design was too large and heavy to be deployed operationally, although it influenced the initial development of the Proton rocket. The next four most powerful nuclear weapons tests ever to have taken place were carried out by the Soviet Union the following year.

The United States government's reaction emphasized the lack of military usefulness, and signalled readiness to sign the Partial Nuclear Test Ban Treaty, eventually realized in 1963. It also prompted the disclosure of the US B41 nuclear bomb's 25 Mt (105 PJ) yield. In the Western world, the reaction focused on the incorrectly assumed record level of fission product fallout from a typical fissionable tamper design, similar to the US Castle Bravo test disaster. In fact, the Tsar Bomba derived only 3% of its yield from fission, or 1.5 Mt.

== Background ==
In the late 1950s Cold War, the US nuclear weapons arsenal greatly exceeded that of the USSR in quantity of weapons, total explosive yield of weapons, and their ability to deliver the weapon. In the early part of the decade, the Strategic Air Command had begun deploying nuclear-capable bombers, as well as actual weapons, to airbases hosted by US allies within striking distance of the Soviet Union, as well as deploying them on aircraft carriers and on medium-range ballistic missiles in the United Kingdom. The USSR had a credible ability to threaten American allies in Western Europe and Asia via a limited bomber and short-range missile force, had tested a multi-stage thermonuclear weapon in 1955, and had begun testing a prototype rocket for an intercontinental ballistic missile in 1957. Its leadership was well aware that the USSR's deployed nuclear forces in 1960 could not reliably and credibly threaten targets in the continental United States, and that in the event of war, the Soviet Union would struggle to reply in kind. This in turn threatened to weaken Soviet leverage in hot-spots like Berlin, which had been the subject of Soviet and American tension since the end of World War II.

Given the Soviet Union's strategic disadvantage concerning America's nuclear weapons possessions, foreign policy and propaganda considerations during the leaderships of Georgy Malenkov and Nikita Khrushchev made a response to the perceived US nuclear blackmail imperative for both international and domestic reasons. The creation of the Tsar Bomba represented part of a larger effort to maintain the concept of nuclear deterrence, and to impress (and terrify) both domestic and international audiences with the strength of the Soviet nuclear weapons program, even though the weapon itself was arguably impractical.

== Name ==
The name Tsar Bomba is a recent invention dating to the 1990s. Contemporaneous with the test, the bomb was referred to by Western Bloc press as the "50-megaton bomb" or "100-megaton bomb".

Tsar Bomba was a modification of an earlier project, RN202, which used a ballistic case of the same size but a very different internal mechanism. Many published books, even some authored by those involved in product development of 602, contain inaccuracies that are replicated elsewhere, including wrongly identifying Tsar Bomba as RDS-202 or RN202. The bomb was officially known as "product 602" (изделие 602) or "AN602", and codenamed "Ivan". The usage of different names can be a source of confusion. The Tsar Bomba, being a modification of (the) RN202, is sometimes mistakenly labelled as RDS-37, RDS-202 or PH202 (product 202). Sources have also reported the bomb as RDS-220.

Unofficially, the bomb would later become known as "Tsar Bomba" and "Kuzka's mother" (Кузькина мать, Kuz'kina mat'). The name Tsar Bomba (loosely translated as Emperor of Bombs) comes from an allusion to two other Russian historical artifacts, the Tsar Cannon and the Tsar Bell, both of which were created as showpieces but whose large size made them impractical for use. The name "Tsar Bomba" does not seem to have been used for the weapon prior to the 1990s. The name "Kuzka's Mother" was inspired by the statement of Khrushchev to then US Vice President Richard Nixon: "We have funds at our disposal that will have dire consequences for you. We will show you Kuzka's mother!"

The Central Intelligence Agency (CIA) designated the test as "JOE 111" using their "JOE" counting scheme, which had begun with RDS-1 in 1949.

== Development ==
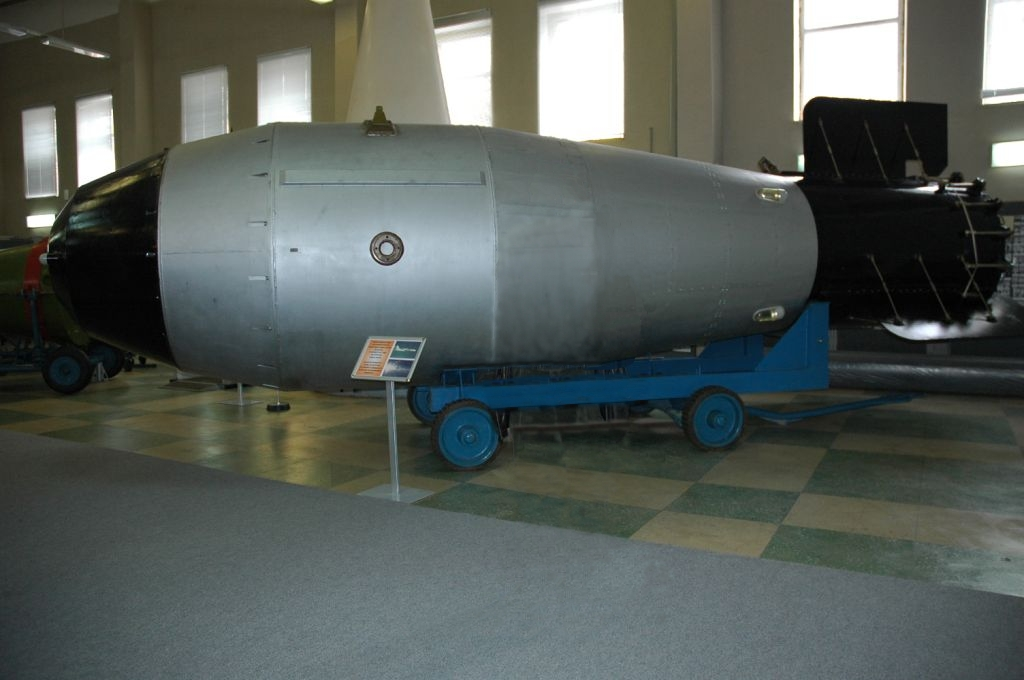
A Tsar Bomba-type casing on display at the Sarov atomic bomb museum, Sarov

The development of a very large bomb began in 1956 and was carried out in two stages. At the first stage, from 1956 to 1958, it was "product 202", which was developed in the recently created NII-1011. The modern name of NII-1011 is the "Russian Federal Nuclear Center or the All-Russian Scientific Research Institute of Technical Physics" (RFNC-VNIITF). According to the official history of the institute, the order on the creation of a research institute in the system of the Ministry of Medium Machine Building was signed on 5 April 1955; work at the NII-1011 began a little later.

At the second stage of development, from 1960 to a successful test in 1961, the bomb was called "item 602" and was developed at KB-11 (VNIIEF), V. B. Adamsky was developing, and the physical scheme was developed by Andrei Sakharov, Yu. N. Babaev, Yu. N. Smirnov, and Yu. A. Trutnev.

=== Product 202 ===
After the successful test of the RDS-37, KB-11 employees (Sakharov, Zeldovich, and Dovidenko) performed a preliminary calculation and, on 2 February 1956, they handed over to N. I. Pavlov, a note with the parameters for charges of 150 Mt (628 PJ) and the possibility of increasing the power to 1 gigaton of TNT (4.2 EJ).

After the creation in 1955 of the second nuclear center – NII-1011, in 1956, by a resolution of the Council of Ministers of the Soviet Union, the center was assigned the task of developing an ultra-high-power charge, which was called "Project 202".

On 12 March 1956, a draft Joint Resolution of the Central Committee of the Communist Party of the Soviet Union (CPSU Central Committee) and the Council of Ministers of the Soviet Union on the preparation and testing of the 202 product was adopted. The project planned to develop a version of the RDS-37 with a capacity of 30 Mt (126 PJ). RDS-202 was designed with a maximum calculated power release of 50 Mt (209 PJ), with a diameter of 2.1 m (6 ft 11 in), a length of 8 m (26 ft), weighing 26 tonnes (29 short tons) with a parachute system and structurally coordinated with the Tu-95-202 carrier aircraft specially converted for its use. On 6 June 1956, the NII-1011 report described the RDS-202 thermonuclear device with a design power of up to 38 Mt (159 PJ) with the required task of 20–30 Mt (84–126 PJ). In reality, this device was developed with an estimated power of 15 Mt (63 PJ), after testing the products "40GN", "245" and "205" its tests were deemed inappropriate and canceled.

The Tsar Bomba differs from its parent design – the RN202 – in several places. The Tsar Bomba was a three-stage bomb with a Trutnev-Babaev second- and third-stage design, with a yield of 50 Mt. This is equivalent to about 1,570 times the combined energy of the bombs that destroyed Hiroshima and Nagasaki, 10 times the combined energy of all the conventional explosives used in World War II, one quarter of the estimated yield of the 1883 eruption of Krakatoa, and 10% of the combined yield of all other nuclear tests to date.

A three-stage hydrogen bomb uses a fission bomb primary to compress a thermonuclear secondary, as in most hydrogen bombs, and then uses energy from the resulting explosion to compress a much larger additional thermonuclear stage. There is evidence that the Tsar Bomba had several third stages rather than a single very large one.

RDS-202 was assembled on the principle of radiation implosion, which was previously tested during the creation of RDS-37. Since it used a much heavier secondary module than in the RDS-37, two primary modules (charges), located on opposite sides of the secondary module, were used to compress it. This physical charging scheme was later used in the design of the AN-602, but the AN-602 thermonuclear charge itself (secondary module) was new. The RDS-202 thermonuclear charge was manufactured in 1956, and was planned for testing in 1957, but was not tested and put into storage. Two years after the manufacture of the RDS-202, in July 1958, it was decided to remove it from storage, dismantle and use automation units and charge parts for experimental work. The CPSU Central Committee and the Council of Ministers of the USSR adopted a draft Joint Resolution on 12 March 1956, on the preparation and testing of izdeliye 202, which read:

Adopt a draft resolution of the CPSU Central Committee and the USSR Council of Ministers on the preparation and testing of izdeliye 202.

Paragraphs required for inclusion in the draft resolution:

(a) The Ministry of Medium Engineering (Comrade Avraami Zavenyagin) and the Ministry of Defense of the USSR (Comrade Georgy Zhukov) at the end of the preparatory work for the test of izdeliye 202 to report to the CPSU Central Committee on the situation;

(b) The Ministry of Medium Engineering (Comrade Zavenyagin) to solve the issue of introducing a special stage of protection into the design of izdeliye 202 to ensure disarming of the product in the event of a failure of the parachute system, as well as their proposals reported to the CPSU Central Committee.

Comrades Boris Vannikov and Kurchatov are assigned to edit the final version of this resolution.

=== Product 602 ===
View of the possible fission bomb primary within the Tsar Bomba casing, under construction at KB-11.

In 1960, KB-11 began developing a thermonuclear device with a design capacity of one hundred megatons of TNT (418 petajoules). In February 1961, the leaders of KB-11 sent a letter to the Central Committee of the CPSU with the subject line "Some questions of the development of nuclear weapons and methods of their use", which, among other things, raised the question of the expediency of developing such a 100 Mt device. On 10 July 1961, a discussion took place in the Central Committee of the CPSU, at which First Secretary Nikita Khrushchev supported the development and testing of this super-powerful bomb.

To speed up the work on Tsar Bomba, it was based on the 202 Project, but was a new project, developed by a different group. For KB-11, six casings for the Project 202 bomb already manufactured at NII-1011 and a set of equipment developed for the 202 Project testing were used.

Tsar Bomba had a "three-stage" design: the first stage is the necessary fission trigger. The second stage was two relatively small thermonuclear charges with a calculated contribution to the explosion of 1.5 Mt (6 PJ), which were used for radiation implosion of the third stage, the main thermonuclear module located between them, and starting a thermonuclear reaction in it, contributing 50 Mt of explosion energy. As a result of the thermonuclear reaction, huge numbers of high-energy fast neutrons were formed in the main thermonuclear module, which, in turn, initiated the fast fission nuclear reaction in the nuclei of the surrounding uranium-238, which would have added another 50 Mt of energy to the explosion, so that the estimated energy release of Tsar Bomba was around 100 Mt.

The test of such a complete three-stage 100 Mt bomb was rejected due to the extremely high level of radioactive contamination that would be caused by the fission reaction of large quantities of uranium-238. During the test, the bomb was used in a two-stage version. A. D. Sakharov suggested using the non-fissionable lead instead of the uranium-238 in the secondary's tamper, which reduced the bomb's energy to 50 Mt, and, in addition to reducing the amount of radioactive fission products, avoided the fireball's contact with the Earth's surface, thus eliminating radioactive contamination of the soil and the distribution of large amounts of fallout into the atmosphere. In the United States nuclear complex this use of lead tampers became common after the Castle Bravo testing disaster, and was known as the "materials substitution method".

Many technical innovations were applied in the design of Tsar Bomba. The thermonuclear charge was made according to the "bifilar" scheme – the radiation implosion of the main thermonuclear stage was carried out from two opposite sides. These secondary charges produced X-ray compression of the main thermonuclear charge. For this, the second stage was separated into two fusion charges which were placed in the front and rear parts of the bomb, for which a synchronous detonation was required with a difference in initiation of no more than 100 nanoseconds. To ensure synchronous detonation of charges with the required accuracy, the sequencing unit of the detonation electronics was modified at KB-25 (now "Federal State Unitary Enterprise "NL Dukhov All-Russian Scientific Research Institute of Automation")(VNIIA).

== Development of the carrier aircraft ==
The initial three-stage design of Tsar Bomba was capable of yielding approximately 100 Mt (approximately 3,000 times the power of the Hiroshima (15 kt) and Nagasaki (21 kt) bombs, combined); however, it was thought that this would have resulted in too much nuclear fallout, and the aircraft delivering the bomb would not have had enough time to escape the explosion. To limit the amount of fallout, uranium-238 in the tamper was replaced with lead. This eliminated fast fission reactions from the tamper by the fusion-stage neutrons, so that approximately 97% of the total yield resulted from thermonuclear fusion alone. As such, it was one of the "cleanest" nuclear bombs ever created, as most of the radioactive intensity of nuclear fallout is caused by the creation of fission products. There was a strong incentive for this modification, since most of the fallout from a test of the bomb would probably have descended on populated Soviet territory.

The first studies on "Topic 242" began immediately after Igor Kurchatov talked with Andrei Tupolev in late 1954. Tupolev appointed his deputy for weapon systems, Aleksandr Nadashkevich, as the head of the topic. Subsequent analysis indicated that to carry such a heavy, concentrated load, the Tu-95 bomber carrying the Tsar Bomba needed to have its engines, bomb bay, suspension and release mechanisms extensively redesigned. The Tsar Bomba's dimensional and weight drawings were passed in the first half of 1955, together with its placement layout drawing. The Tsar Bomba's weight accounted for 15% of the weight of its Tu-95 carrier as expected. The carrier, aside from having its fuel tanks and bomb bay doors removed, had its BD-206 bomb-holder replaced by a new, heavier beam-type BD7-95-242 (or BD-242) holder attached directly to the longitudinal weight-bearing beams. The problem of how to release the bomb was also solved; the bomb-holder would release all three of its locks in a synchronous fashion via electro-automatic mechanisms as required by safety protocols.

A Joint Resolution of the CPSU Central Committee and the Council of Ministers (Nr. 357-28ss) was issued on 17 March 1956, which mandated that OKB-156 begin conversion of a Tu-95 bomber into a high-yield nuclear bomb carrier. These works were carried out in the Gromov Flight Research Institute from May to September 1956. The converted bomber, designated the Tu-95V, was accepted for duty and was handed over for flight tests, which including a release of a mock-up "superbomb", were conducted under the command of Colonel S. M. Kulikov until 1959, and passed without major issues.

Despite the creation of the Tu-95V bomb-carrier aircraft, the test of the Tsar Bomba was postponed for political reasons: namely, Khrushchev's visit to the United States and a pause in the Cold War. The Tu-95V during this period was flown to Uzyn, in today's Ukraine, and was used as a training aircraft; therefore, it was no longer listed as a combat aircraft. With the beginning of a new round of the Cold War in 1961, the test was resumed. The Tu-95V had all connectors in its automatic release mechanism replaced, the bomb bay doors removed and the aircraft itself covered with a special, reflective white paint.

In late 1961, the aircraft was modified for testing Tsar Bomba at the Kuibyshev aircraft plant.

== Test ==
Novaya Zemlya
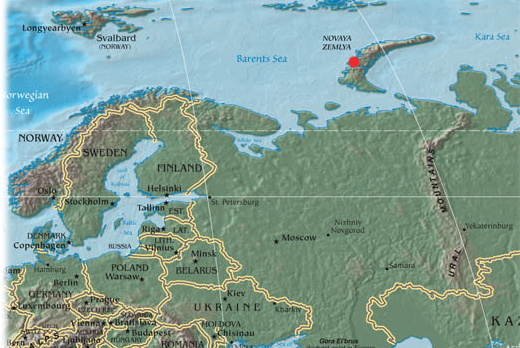
- Novaya Zemlya was the site of the world's largest nuclear explosion, the 50 Mt Tsar Bomba

Site information
- Type: Nuclear test site
- Operator: Russian Federation (formerly Soviet Union)
- Status: Active

Location
- Site of the detonation on Novaya Zemlya
- Coordinates: 73°48′26″N 54°58′54″E
- Area: land: 55,200 km^{2} (21,300 sq mi) water: 36,000 km^{2} (14,000 sq mi)

Site history
- In use: 1955–present

Test information
- Subcritical tests: not known
- Nuclear tests: 224

Nikita Khrushchev, the first secretary of the Communist Party, announced the upcoming tests of a 50-Mt bomb in his opening report at the 22nd Congress of the Communist Party of the Soviet Union on 17 October 1961. Before the official announcement, in a casual conversation, he told an American politician about the bomb, and this information was published on 8 September 1961, in The New York Times. The Tsar Bomba was tested on 30 October 1961.

The Tupolev Tu-95V aircraft No. 5800302 carrying the bomb took off from the Olenya airfield, and flew to State Test Site No. 6 of the USSR Ministry of Defense on Novaya Zemlya with a crew of nine:

- Test pilot – Major Andrei Yegorovich Durnovtsev
- Lead navigator of tests – Major Ivan Nikiforovich Kleshch
- Second pilot – Captain Mikhail Konstantinovich Kondratenko
- Navigator-operator of the radar – Lieutenant Anatoly Sergeevich Bobikov
- Radar operator – Captain Alexander Filippovich Prokopenko
- Flight engineer – Captain Grigory Mikhailovich Yevtushenko
- Radio operator – Lieutenant Mikhail Petrovich Mashkin
- Gunner / radio operator – Captain Vyacheslav Mikhailovich Snetkov
- Gunner / radio operator – Corporal Vasily Yakovlevich Bolotov

The test was also attended by the Tupolev Tu-16 laboratory aircraft, no. 3709, equipped for monitoring the tests, and its crew:

- Leading test pilot – Lieutenant Colonel Vladimir Fyodorovich Martynenko
- Second pilot – Senior Lieutenant Vladimir Ivanovich Mukhanov
- Leading navigator – Major Semyon Artemievich Grigoryuk
- Navigator-operator of the radar – Major Vasily Timofeevich Muzlanov
- Gunner / radio operator – Senior Sergeant Mikhail Emelyanovich Shumilov

Both aircraft were painted with special reflective paint to minimize heat damage. Despite this, Durnovtsev and his crew were given only a 50% chance of surviving the test.

The bomb, weighing 27 tonnes (30 short tons), was so large (8 m (26 ft) long by 2.1 m (6 ft 11 in) in diameter) that the Tu-95V had to have its bomb bay doors and fuselage fuel tanks removed. The bomb was attached to an 800-kilogram (1,800 lb), 1,600-square-metre (17,000 sq ft) parachute, which gave the release and observer planes time to fly about 45 km (28 mi) away from ground zero, giving them a 50 percent chance of survival. The bomb was released two hours after takeoff from a height of 10,500 m (34,449 ft) on a test target within Sukhoy Nos. The Tsar Bomba detonated at 11:32 (or 11:33; USGS earthquake monitors list the event as occurring at 11:33:31) Moscow Time on 30 October 1961, over the Mityushikha Bay nuclear testing range (Sukhoy Nos Zone C), at a height of 4,200 m (13,780 ft) ASL (4,000 m (13,123 ft) above the target) (Note: Some sources suggest 3,900 m (12,795 ft) ASL and 3,700 m (12,139 ft) above target, or 4,500 m (14,764 ft).)

By the time of detonation, the Tu-95V had already escaped to 39 km (24 mi) away from the explosion, and the Tu-16 was 53.5 km (33.2 mi) away. When detonation occurred, the shock wave caught up with the Tu-95V at a distance of 115 km (71 mi) and the Tu-16 at 205 km (127 mi). After the shock wave reached the aircraft, the Tu-95V had its speed increased in a split second from 880 to 980 km/h, and dropped 800 metres (2,600 ft) in the air due to the combination of the shock wave with exceptionally high air density drop immediately afterwards. However, both aircraft managed to recover and land safely. According to initial data, the Tsar Bomba had a nuclear yield of 58.6 Mt (245 PJ) (exceeding what the design itself would suggest) and was overestimated at values all the way up to 75 Mt (310 PJ). Both aircraft had their frames burned-out black by the light radiation in all parts exposed to the blast, and they also had its airframe compressed by the shock wave, while the stringers, ribs, frames of the wings and fuselage, normally hidden under the aircraft coating, became clearly visible and in some places protruded outward (soon afterwards the Tu-95V was donated as a visual exhibit of nuclear blast effects for Tambov Higher Military Aviation School).

The Tsar Bomba's fireball, about 8 km (5 mi) wide at its maximum, was prevented from touching the ground by the shock wave, but reached nearly 10.5 km (34,000 ft) in the sky – the altitude of the deploying bomber.

Although simplistic fireball calculations predicted it would be large enough to hit the ground, the bomb's own shock wave bounced back and prevented this. The 8-kilometre-wide (5.0 mi) fireball reached nearly as high as the altitude of the release plane and was visible at almost 1,000 km (620 mi) away. The mushroom cloud was about 67 km (42 mi) high (nearly eight times the height of Mount Everest), which meant that the cloud was above the stratosphere and well inside the mesosphere when it peaked. The base was 40 km (25 mi) wide.

A Soviet cameraman said:

The clouds beneath the aircraft and in the distance were lit up by the powerful flash. The sea of light spread under the hatch and even clouds began to glow and became transparent. At that moment, our aircraft emerged from between two cloud layers and down below in the gap a huge bright orange ball was emerging. The ball was powerful and arrogant like Jupiter. Slowly and silently it crept upwards ... Having broken through the thick layer of clouds it kept growing. It seemed to suck the whole Earth into it. The spectacle was fantastic, unreal, supernatural.

== Test results ==
The explosion of Tsar Bomba, according to the classification of nuclear explosions, was an ultra-high-power low-air nuclear explosion.

The mushroom cloud of Tsar Bomba seen from a distance of 161 km (100 mi). The crown of the cloud is 65 km (40 mi) high at the time of the picture. (source: Rosatom State Corporation Communications Department 20–08–2020)

- The flare was visible at a distance of more than 1,000 km (620 mi). It was observed in Norway, Greenland and Alaska.
- The explosion's mushroom cloud rose to a height of 67 km (42 mi). The shape of the "hat" was two-tiered; the diameter of the upper tier was estimated at 95 km (59 mi), the lower tier at 70 km (43 mi). The cloud was observed 800 km (500 mi) from the explosion site.
- The blast wave circled the globe three times, with the first one taking 36 hours and 27 minutes.
- A seismic wave in the Earth's crust, generated by the shock wave of the explosion, also circled the globe three times.
- The atmospheric pressure wave resulting from the explosion was recorded three times in New Zealand: the station in Wellington recorded an increase in pressure at 21:57, on 30 October, coming from the north-west, at 07:17 on 31 October, from the southeast, and at 09:16, on 1 November, from the northwest (all GMT), with amplitudes of 0.6 mbar (0.60 hPa), 0.4 mbar (0.40 hPa), and 0.2 mbar (0.20 hPa) respectively. The average wave speed is estimated at 303 m/s (990 ft/s), or 9.9 degrees of the great circle per hour.
- Glass shattered in windows 780 km (480 mi) from the explosion in a village on Dikson Island.
- The sound wave generated by the explosion reached Dikson Island, but there are no reports of destruction or damage to structures even in the urban-type settlement of Amderma, which is 520 km (320 mi) to the landfall.
- Ionization of the atmosphere caused interference to radio communications even hundreds of kilometers from the test site for about 40 minutes.
- Radioactive contamination of the experimental field with a radius of 2–3 km (1.2–1.9 mi) in the hypocenter area was no more than 1 milliroentgen / hour. The testers appeared at the explosion site 2 hours later; radioactive contamination posed practically no danger to the test participants.
- In the Norwegian border village of Kiberg, fishermen reported injured cod, and border guards reported having contracted cancer in large numbers over the following years, though the latter was never confirmed as being as a result of the bomb.

All buildings in the village of Severny (73°23′20″N 54°44′32″E), both wooden and brick, located 55 km (34 mi) from ground zero within the Sukhoy Nos test range, were destroyed. In districts hundreds of kilometres from ground zero, wooden houses were destroyed; stone ones lost their roofs, windows, and doors; and radio communications were interrupted for almost one hour. One participant in the test saw a bright flash through dark goggles and felt the effects of a thermal pulse at a distance of 270 km (170 mi). The heat from the explosion could have caused third-degree burns 100 km (62 mi) away from ground zero. A shock wave was observed in the air at Dikson settlement 700 km (430 mi) away; windowpanes were partially broken for distances up to 900 kilometres (560 mi). Atmospheric focusing caused blast damage at even greater distances, breaking windows in Norway and Finland. Despite being detonated 4.2 km (3 mi) above ground, its seismic body wave magnitude was estimated at 5.0–5.25.

== Reactions ==
Immediately after the test, several United States politicians condemned the Soviet Union. Prime Minister of Sweden Tage Erlander saw the blast as the Soviets' answer to a personal appeal to halt nuclear testing that he had sent the Soviet leader in the week prior to the blast. The British Foreign Office, Prime Minister of Norway Einar Gerhardsen, Prime Minister of Denmark Viggo Kampmann and others also released statements condemning the blast. Soviet and Chinese radio stations mentioned the US underground nuclear test of a much smaller bomb (possibly the Mink test) carried out the day prior, without mentioning the Tsar Bomba test.

== Consequences of the test ==
The creation and testing of a superbomb were of great political importance; the Soviet Union demonstrated its potential in creating a nuclear arsenal of great power (at that time, the most powerful thermonuclear charge tested by the United States, Castle Bravo, had been 15 Mt). After the Tsar Bomba test, the United States did not increase the power of its own thermonuclear tests and, in 1963 in Moscow, the Treaty Banning Nuclear Weapon Tests in the Atmosphere, Outer Space and Under Water was signed.

The main scientific result of the test was the experimental verification of the principles of calculation and design of multistage thermonuclear charges. It also confirmed the theory that there is no fundamental limit to the power of a thermonuclear charge. This fact had probably been first postulated in October 1949 (three years before the Ivy Mike test which utilized the Teller-Ulam design), when in the supplement to the official report of the General Advisory Committee of the US Atomic Energy Commission, nuclear physicists Enrico Fermi and Isidor Isaac Rabi stated that thermonuclear weapons can potentially have "unlimited destructive power".

The explosive power of the bomb could have easily been raised by another 50 Mt by using a uranium-238 sheath instead of lead. It was consciously decided to replace the cladding material and thus decrease the yield in order to reduce radioactive fallout below an acceptable level.

The explosion is one of the cleanest in the history of atmospheric nuclear tests per unit of power. The first stage of the bomb was a uranium charge with a capacity of 1.5 Mt, which produced a large amount of radioactive fallout, but more than 97% of the explosion power was provided by a thermonuclear fusion reaction, which does not create a significant amount of radioactive contamination.

A 2015 expedition measuring the glaciers of Novaya Zemlya reported 65–130 times more radioactivity than the background in neighboring areas, due to nuclear testing, including Tsar Bomba.

Andrei Sakharov was one of the most prominent speakers against nuclear proliferation. He played a key role in signing the 1963 Partial Test Ban Treaty. Sakharov became an advocate of civil liberties and reforms in the Soviet Union. In 1973 he was nominated for the Nobel Peace Prize and in 1974 was awarded the Prix mondial Cino Del Duca. He won the Nobel Peace Prize in 1975, but was not allowed to leave the Soviet Union to collect it. His wife Yelena Bonner read his speech at the acceptance ceremony.

== Analysis ==
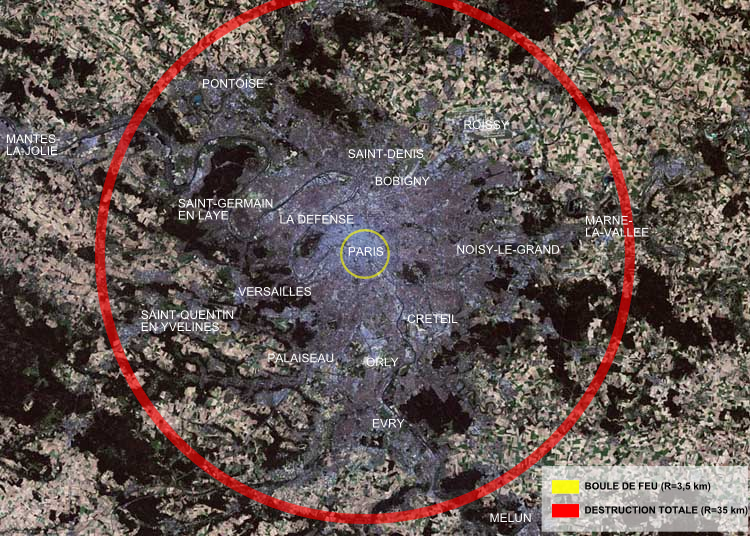
Total destructive radius, superimposed on Paris with the red circle indicating the area of total destruction (radius 35 kilometres [22 mi]), and the yellow circle the radius of the fireball (radius 3.5 kilometres [2 mi])

The Tsar Bomba is the single most physically powerful device ever deployed on Earth, the most powerful nuclear bomb tested and the largest human-made explosion in history. For comparison, the largest weapon ever produced by the US, the now-decommissioned B41, had a predicted maximum yield of 25 Mt (100 PJ). The largest nuclear device ever tested by the US (Castle Bravo) yielded 15 Mt (63 PJ) because of an unexpectedly high involvement of lithium-7 in the fusion reaction; the preliminary prediction for the yield was from 4 to 6 Mt (17 to 25 PJ). The largest weapons deployed by the Soviet Union were also around 25 Mt (100 PJ) (e.g., the SS-18 Mod. 3 warhead).

The weight and size of the Tsar Bomba limited the range and speed of the specially-modified bomber carrying it. Delivery by an intercontinental ballistic missile would have required a much stronger missile (the Proton started its development as that delivery system). It has been estimated that detonating the original 100 Mt (420 PJ) design would have increased the world's total fission fallout since the invention of the atomic bomb by 25%. It was decided that a full 100 Mt detonation would create a nuclear fallout that was unacceptable in terms of pollution from a single test, as well as a near-certainty that the release plane and crew would be destroyed before it could escape the blast radius.

The Tsar Bomba was the culmination of a series of high-yield thermonuclear weapons designed by the Soviet Union and the United States during the 1950s (e.g., the Mark 17 and B41 nuclear bombs).

== Practical applications ==
The Tsar Bomba was never intended to be a practical or mass-produced weapon; it was a single product, the design of which allowed reaching a power of 100 Mt. The test of a 50-Mt bomb was, among other things, a test of the performance of the product design for 100 Mt. However, there were several "super-heavy" ballistic missiles that were developed by the Soviet Union whose early impetus was at least partially, if not entirely, designed to give them a capability to use warheads in the 50–150 Mt range. These included:

- UR-500 – (warhead mass – 40 tons, virtually implemented as a carrier rocket – "Proton" – GRAU index – 8K82)
- N-1 – (warhead mass – 75–95 t (74–93 long tons; 83–105 short tons), the development was reoriented into a carrier for the lunar program, the project was brought to the stage of flight design tests and closed in 1976, GRAU index – 11A52).
- R-56 – (GRAU index – 8K67)

In the absence of a push for such high-yield weapons, all of these rocket programs were either used as launch vehicles for the Soviet space program, or cancelled.

== Films ==
- Footage from a Soviet documentary about the bomb is featured in Trinity and Beyond: The Atomic Bomb Movie (Visual Concept Entertainment, 1995), where it is referred to as the Russian monster bomb. The video has a few inaccuracies: It states that the Tsar Bomba project broke the voluntary moratorium on nuclear tests. In fact, the Soviets had restarted their test program and broken the unilateral voluntary moratorium 30 days before Tsar Bomba, testing 45 times in that month. Since the moratorium was unilateral there was no legal obstacle. The US had declared their own one-year unilateral moratorium on nuclear tests and, as that year had expired, the US had already announced that it considered itself free to resume testing without further notice. Later it was stated that the US had not resumed testing at the time of the Tsar Bomba test. That was incorrect, as the US had in fact tested five times under Operation Nougat between the USSR's ending of the moratorium on 1 October and the Tsar Bomba test on 30 October.
- "World's Biggest Bomb", a 2011 episode of the PBS documentary series Secrets of the Dead produced by Blink Films & WNET, chronicles the events leading to the detonations of Castle Bravo and the Tsar Bomba.
- In connection with the celebration of 75 years of nuclear industry, Rosatom released a declassified Russian language documentary video of the Tsar Bomba test on YouTube in August 2020.

== See also ==
- Father of All Bombs – largest Russian conventional bomb
- Soviet atomic bomb project
- Doomsday device
- Sundial (weapon)
