= RDS-37 =

Soviet hydrogen bomb first tested in 1955

- The thermonuclear mushroom cloud stem, showing a characteristic condensation ring

Information
- Country: Soviet Union
- Test site: Semipalatinsk Test Site, Kazakh SSR
- Period: November 1955
- Number of tests: 1
- Test type: Atmospheric test
- Device type: Fusion
- Max. yield: Total yield 1.6 megatons of TNT (6.7 PJ)

Test chronology

RDS-37 (Russian: РДС-37, CIA: JOE 19) was the Soviet Union's first two-stage thermonuclear weapon test, dropped from a Tupolev Tu-16 bomber over Semipalatinsk Test Site on 22 November 1955. The yield was 1.6 megatons, scaled down from a 3 megaton design. It was the world's first air-dropped multi-stage thermonuclear test; prior US thermonuclear tests Ivy Mike (1952) and in Operation Castle (1954) were ground-based experiments.

The Soviet nuclear weapons project had previously tested thermonuclear reactions RDS-6s in 1953. This was a 400-kiloton single-stage layer cake design (Russian: 'sloika') achieved using layers of lithium deuteride-tritide fusion fuel and natural uranium surrounding a highly enriched uranium core. Scientists expanded sloika designs, testing the tritium-free RDS-27 at 250 kilotons, and outlining a 1.8 megaton 'RDS-6sd', but the single-stage design proved very difficult to scale.

Physicists Andrei Sakharov and Yakov Zeldovich then independently invented the radiation implosion design, using the X-rays from a fission-based nuclear primary to compress a fusion-fuelled secondary, specifically a spherical sloika. Dubbed "Sakharov's Third Idea", this was equivalent to the US Teller-Ulam design.

== Leading to the RDS-37 ==
Sketch by Andrei Sakharov in 1954 of the Soviet hydrogen bomb concept: "A": The atomic bomb primary; "Д": The diaphragm, presumably a neutron shield; "C": The sloika layered thermonuclear secondary

The RDS-37 was a reaction to the efforts of the United States. Previously, the Soviet Union allegedly used many of their spies in the U.S. to help them generate methods and ideas for the nuclear bomb. The creation of the hydrogen bomb required less usage of this method, although they still received help from some spies, most importantly, Klaus Fuchs.

In 1945, the Soviet Union reached a decision to work on a design for a "super bomb". Also in 1945, Enrico Fermi gave lectures at Los Alamos discussing the fusion process. At the end of his lecture he stated "so far all schemes for the initiation of the super [are] rather vague".

In the spring of 1946, Edward Teller set up a conference to assess all the information known about the hydrogen bomb. Klaus Fuchs attended this same conference. In the same year, Teller postulated a new design for the hydrogen bomb, which he called the "Alarm Clock", which he suggested would use lithium-6 deuteride instead of pure deuterium.

Klaus Fuchs had passed on information about both the fission bomb and the hydrogen bomb to the Soviet Union. This information resulted in the recruitment of Igor Tamm’s group, whose work helped create the hydrogen bomb. The content that Fuchs provided in 1948 was not only related to the hydrogen bomb, but also the nuclear industry as a whole. It provided detailed insight into the bomb design using a two-stage igniting block.

The designs were quickly sent to Lavrentiy Beria, who had been placed in charge of the Russian bomb program by Joseph Stalin and forwarded to Igor Kurchatov, Boris Vannikov and Yulii Khariton, to validate and assess these designs. On May 5, 1948, Vannikov and Kurchatov wrote a reply, stating:

As regards the material No. 713a, the basic ideas about the role of tritium in the transfer of explosion from a uranium-235 primer to deuterium, about the necessity of careful selection of uranium primer power, and about the role of particles and photons in the transfer of the explosion to deuterium are new. These materials are valuable in that they will be helpful to Cde. Zel’dovich in his work on the superbomb, performed under the operations plans approved by the First Main Directorate. More effort should be put into research in that area, and a start should be made on the work on the practical design.

Vannikov set out to study deuterium and its effects. Khariton also sent his reply on 5 May 1948, which urged the Soviet Union to set up a design group.

At that time, very few people knew anything about hydrogen bomb design. The scientists in the United States also did not fully understand their own designs. The Soviet Union set up a group to work on the hydrogen bomb. In August 1948, Andrei Sakharov postulated the sloyka, or layer cake method, which consisted of alternating layers of uranium and thermonuclear fuel. In early 1949, this layer-cake design was tweaked, with lithium-6 deuteride as the thermonuclear fuel.

In early 1950, Klaus Fuchs was arrested in the United Kingdom, and was unable to continue his espionage activity for the Soviet Union.

The Soviet scientists had the idea to increase the deuterium density. Sakharov and his team saw the possibility of detonating a smaller nuclear bomb within the layer cake. This idea was successful, and the first implementation was used on the RDS-6s. The RDS-6s paved the way for the RDS-37. By 1952, the Soviet Union began to fully consider the two-stage bomb. However, in 1954, the plan was finally realized. Prior to 1954, the thermonuclear device was not thought to be initiated by radiation, but by a shock wave.

On 1 November 1952, the United States tested their first "hydrogen bomb", codenamed Ivy Mike. The design was based on the Teller–Ulam layout. Ivy Mike was not a usable weapon. It was massive in size, weighing 82 tons. On 12 August 1953, the Soviets had tested their own "hydrogen bomb" in a test code named "Joe 4", which was based on the layer-cake design. By this time no one had created a "true" hydrogen bomb. All other tests had a kiloton yield.

In the spring of 1954, the US tested a series of six nuclear devices, known as Operation Castle, with each experiment being in the megaton range. The first of these was Castle Bravo, which eventually turned out as the largest detonation by the United States ever.

By spring of 1954, the Soviet scientists began to understand the possibility of releasing radiation from the nuclear-bomb trigger and using it to initiate the fusion part of the bomb. This idea parallels the Teller–Ulam design used in the Mike detonation. They subsequently abandoned the single-stage layer-cake and tube designs, and focused entirely on the two-stage bomb project. A report on the activity of the theoretical sector No. 1 published in 1954 states:

Atomic compression is being investigated theoretically in collaboration with members of sector No. 2. The main problems associated with atomic compression are in the developmental stage. Emission of radiation from the atomic bomb used to compress the main body. Calculations show that for radiation is emitted very strongly. Conversion of radiant energy into mechanical energy to compress the main body. These principles have been developed through the efforts of Sectors No. 2. and No. 1.

On 22 November 1955, the Russians tested their first true two-stage hydrogen bomb in the megaton range, the RDS-37. This test implemented the two-stage radiation implosion. This was also the world's first air-dropped fusion-bomb test.

== Foundations of RDS-37 ==
After the Bravo Test in March 1954, Soviet scientists started to search for ways to make an effective large-yield thermonuclear bomb. After a lot of intensive research of past experience with these bombs, a new two-stage bomb was devised.

The RDS-37's thermonuclear charges are founded in fundamental scientific concepts of high-energy-density physics. The principle of radiation implosion assumes three concepts. According to Ilkaev, they are: "the predominant proportion of the energy of the explosion of the nuclear charge (the primary module) is generated in the form of X-ray radiation; the energy of the X-ray radiation is transported to the fusion module; the implosion of the fusion module using the energy of the 'delivered' X-ray radiation". Hopes for a better compression of nuclear material that could be initiated had been in discussion since the early 1950s.

Not long after, Yakov Zeldovich and Andrei Sakharov started to work on this theory. "In January 1954, Ya. B. Zeldovich and A. D. Sakharov considered in detail a device layout which incorporated the principle of a two-stage nuclear charge".

Many people questioned whether they could be successful from the very beginning. Questions concerning the two-stage nuclear charge fell into two categories.

The first set of questions concerned nuclear implosion. The first module, or fission trigger, initiated "by compression of nuclear material or fission and fusion of materials by spherical explosion of chemical explosives, in which the spherical symmetry of the implosion was dictated by the initial spherically symmetric detonation of the explosive".

There seemed to be no way in which "a heterogeneous structure composed of a primary source (or sources) and a compressible secondary module" could "maintain the spherically symmetric 'nuclear implosion".

The following is a report by Sakharov and Romanov on 6 August, with the title "Atomic Compression". "Atomic Compression is being investigated theoretically in collaboration with members of sector No. 2. The main problems associated with atomic compression are in the development stage.

(1) Emission of radiation from the atomic bomb used to compress main body. Calculations show that for [deleted] radiation is emitted very strongly...

(2) Conversion of radiant energy into mechanical energy to compress the main body. It is postulated [deleted]. These principles have been developed through the team efforts of Sectors No. 2 and No. 1 (Ya. B. Zel’dovich, Yu. A. Trutnev, and A. D. Sakharov)...".

This problem with a two-stage nuclear charge brings about two other problems. One, "what is now the carrier of the explosive energy of the original source?". Two, "how is this energy transported to the secondary module?".

The second set of questions concerns the secondary module impacted by the nuclear implosion of the fission trigger. At first, scientist thought that the energy of a nuclear initiation of the fission trigger in a two-stage charge would be transported by the flow of the products of the initiation as the shock wave spread through the heterogeneous structure of the secondary module. Zeldovich and Sakharov "decided to choose an analog of the inner element of the RDS-6s charge for the basic physical element of the secondary module, i.e. the 'layered' spherical configuration of the system".

== Factors behind the design ==
The Soviet Union was able to form some similar achievements to the United States without the help of outside information. "The active material, instead of being a solid sphere to begin with, as in the Nagasaki bomb, would be fabricated as a shell, with a 'levitated' sphere in its center. Part of the expensive plutonium was replaced with less expensive uranium-235. Levitation increased the energy yield and made it possible to reduce the size and weight of the explosive. Similar achievements were achieved without espionage by the Soviet Laboratories." The initial alarm-clock method derived by Teller was assessed by Stanislaw Ulam, who decided that it would be more difficult and costlier than expected. During this time the United States were focused on the Alarm Clock, while the Soviet Union were focusing on the Sloyka method. The alarm-clock dilemma lasted until 1951, when Ulam came up with the idea of compressing a thermonuclear secondary with the hydrodynamic shock produced by a primary fission bomb. Teller agreed with this method and even altered it by using the pressure from the radiation from the primary, rather than hydrodynamic shock.

After Teller had finally accepted this method, the question remained. Which thermonuclear fuel would be involved. The three main choices were lithium deuteride, deuterated ammonia and liquid deuterium. "Each had its advantages and disadvantages, lithium deuteride would be the simplest material to engineer because it was solid at room temperature, but breeding tritium within the bomb from lithium required a complex chain of thermonuclear reactions that involved only one of lithium’s several isotopes." Deuterated ammonia could be kept in the liquid phase with moderate cooling or under mild pressure, but its physical properties were not well known at that point. The problem with liquid deuterium was the technology to transfer and store it in bulk quantities was not yet developed. The United States decided to choose liquid deuterium as their thermonuclear fuel. This was the premise behind the Ivy Mike bomb.

The detonation of Ivy Mike by the United States prompted Soviet retaliation, and the Soviets quickly attempted to catch up. Although the Soviet Union had detonated their RDS-6 around that same time, the RDS-6 was initiated by high-powered explosives, while Ivy Mike was initiated by radiation method. The Soviets then abandoned their layered-cake method and focused on a two-stage bomb method.

The hydrogen bomb primarily has 2 units: a nuclear bomb, which was the primary unit, and a secondary energy unit. The first stage of the hydrogen bomb resembled the layer-cake design, except the main difference is that the initiation is carried out by a nuclear device, rather than a conventional explosive. This design was initially postulated by Enrico Fermi and Edward Teller in 1941. Teller insisted that they should ignite deuterium by some fission weapon. The hydrogen bomb was a challenge, and would be more powerful and destructive than the nuclear bomb. The fusion cell itself was not very powerful, coming out to about 17.6 MeV per reaction, but the quantity of hydrogen fuel can be scaled up to make the weapon as large as desired.

== Design process ==
Andrei Sakharov served as the leading theoretical contributor to the RDS-37 project, as he was the first to quantify the theoretical gains that could be had from a thermonuclear fuel. Sakharov developed his own compression method completely independent of the Teller-Ulam design. Sakharov's design for atomic compression utilized several tightly packed layers of either deuterium-deuterium or deuterium-tritium that would initiate inwardly, achieving an atomic compression. In theory, an atomic initiator would be positioned in the center of a spherical housing that was surrounded by layers of thermonuclear fuel and uranium. The entire system was to be compressed by an explosive placed all around the outside of the multi-layer sphere and initiate an implosion and ultimate initiation of the atomic initiator. The efficiency of this design earned Sakharov some prestige among his co-workers at Design Bureau 11. This design was referred to as the "Sloika" by Sakharov's co-workers as it resembled a traditional Russian, multi-layered cake that was tightly held together by a thick cream. The main problem with his idea was that the reaction cross sections of deuterium-deuterium and deuterium-tritium reactions were not known, and only theorized about. Design Bureau 11 (KB-11) presented the idea for the RDS-6 bomb design to USSR officials using primarily theoretical calculations. Andrei Sakharov published a paper in January 1949 where he noted that the deuterium – tritium and deuterium – deuterium reaction cross sections had not been studied experimentally and all assessments were conjectural. In March 1949 Khariton requested to Beria that Tamm and Kompaneets be given access to the intelligence data with the D–T cross-sections. This was refused to minimize the access to intelligence materials but instead on 27 April D–T cross-section measurements were sent to Tamm and Kompaneets without mentioning the origin. Ironically similar data was published in the Physical Review issue of 15 April 1949. With this information, Sakharov and Design Bureau 11 successfully implemented atomic compression in the RDS-6 tests. On 24 December 1954, the decision for implementation of the idea of atomic compression was green-lit by Soviet officials in a new project code named RDS-37. Test site preparations and other important test operations entered the preparation phase at the start of 1955. For RDS-37, a new design problem made itself known, keeping the distribution of charge from the spherical implosion symmetric. This led to the development of a canonical system in which both the primary and secondary modules were placed into the same compartment to maximize the directional scattering of X-rays. The vast amounts of energy from the initial atomic initiation were transferred in the form of X-rays, which were directed in such a way that they would provide all the required energy to initiate the thermonuclear charge. The technical specifications for the bomb design were completed by 3 February 1955 but were continuously reevaluated and improved up until RDS-37 was delivered to the test site in Semipalatinsk. It was during this time that KB-11 found that they could use lithium–deuterium as a thermonuclear fuel to replace the deuterium–tritium fuel that was decided upon after publication of the Teller–Ulam tests.

Several factors had to be overcome by Design Bureau 11 in implementing the idea of atomic compression. The main problems dealt with the massive amounts of radiation that would be emitted from the initial atomic bomb implosion. The calculated yields were large enough that there was much concern whether or not a structure could be engineered to house and hold the energy emission. The next big obstacle to overcome dealt with converting the vast amounts of radiant energy into mechanical energy that would be used to compress the main body. In a report written by Yakov Zeldovich and Andrei Sakharov, it was stated that the new principle of atomic compression as seen in the RDS-37 was a "shining example of creative teamwork". The report went on further to boast enormous amounts of design-oriented, experimental, and technological efforts carried out under the supervision of Design Bureau 11's chief designer, Yulii Khariton.

The RDS-37 was assembled as an air-deliverable bomb.

== Test ==
In the initial testing phase, the bomb's energy yield was reduced out of safety concerns. The lithium deuteride fusion cell was modified to replace some fusion fuel with a passive material. RDS-37 was first detonated on 22 November 1955.

=== Delivery method ===
The weapon was air-dropped at Semipalatinsk Test Site, Kazakhstan, making it the first air-dropped two-stage thermonuclear test. It was the largest detonation ever carried out at the Semipalatinsk test site. The RDS-6s device (Joe-4) test in 1953 had one-stage design, and was not scalable into the megaton yield range. The RDS-37 was dropped from a Tupolev Tu-16 bomber and was used most through the late 1950s and 1960s. After a while the Soviet Union felt as if the 2.9-megaton thermonuclear bomb was excessive for some missions, so the less powerful RP-30 and RP-32 200-kiloton bombs were ready for some missions. It would take the United States until 20 May 1956, about half a year, to achieve the same results through the Cherokee nuclear weapons test. However, by this time the USAF had several hundred multi-megaton bombs in their arsenal, and more than 1,100 aircraft able to deliver them.

The device was deliberately detonated high in the air to avoid local fallout. The height of burst was 1,550 m (5,090 ft) above the ground.

=== Effect ===
Despite the reduction in yield, much of its shock wave was focused back downward at the ground unexpectedly because the weapon detonated under an inversion layer, causing a trench to collapse on a group of soldiers, killing one. It also caused a building in Kurchatov, 65 km (40 mi) away, to collapse killing a young girl. A group of forty-two individuals in Kurchatov were also recorded as having been injured from the glass fragments flying out due to the breaking of the windows (confirmation needed as it is an assumption by common sense) caused by the explosion. A scientist in Andrei Sakharov's theoretical lab recalled the test in a collective book of memoirs. He witnessed the RDS-37 test from a viewing station thirty-two kilometers (20 miles) away from the hypocenter. As the countdown reached zero, the first impression he had "was of almost intolerable heat, as if [his head] had been placed into an open oven for several seconds." The shock wave of dust and debris caused by the explosion could be seen and heard approaching and reached the viewing station roughly ninety seconds after the thermonuclear detonation. All viewers were forced to fall down on their faces with their feet pointed toward the explosion to help avoid injury from flying debris. After the shock wave passed, all the viewers stood up and started cheering their success, the Soviet Union became the first to successfully air deliver a two-stage thermonuclear weapon. The measured energy yield of the device was equivalent to that of 1.6 megatons of TNT.

After the test, the commission noted three things during the meeting on 24 November 1955, "the design of the hydrogen bomb, based on a novel principle, has been successfully tested; it is necessary to continue detailed studies of the processes proceeding in explosions of bombs of this type; further development of hydrogen bombs should be conducted on the basis of a broad application of the principles chosen as the foundation of the RDS-37 bomb". The successful testing of the RDS-37 made it possible to start large-scale development of thermonuclear weapons. The charge of the RDS-37 became the prototype for all of the following two-stage thermonuclear devices in the USSR.

== Aftermath ==
=== Western reaction ===
On 7 December, in the British House of Commons, Barbara Castle argued for a unilateral testing moratorium on the British hydrogen bomb programme:

But did not the Prime Minister's reply ignore the fact that this is just the moment to stop the hydrogen bomb tests, because East and West have now reached parity in the development of the fission-fusion-fission bomb? In view of this, is it not disastrous for us, in order to have our own miserable little bomb, to hold up the ban on tests, which means that America will go on in the spring, as already announced, with the explosion of bigger and better bombs?

A The New York Times article noted the significance of the test as an airbust, but varyingly guessed at altitudes up to 85,000 ft, from either a bomber or a missile, and a yield of between two and fifteen megatons.

=== Analysis ===
The RDS-37 tests at the Semipalatinsk Site proved to bring the Soviet Union back into the arms race with the United States. A large part of this was due to the fact that the Soviet Union was the first nation to successfully employ the use of lithium deuteride as a thermonuclear fuel. Another important factor to consider was the accuracy with which the Soviets were able to predict the energy yields of their bombs. The predictions for the RDS-6 tests were accurate up to 30% and the RDS-37 tests were accurate to within 10%, whereas the American counterpart energy yield predictions were off by a factor of two and a half in the Castle Bravo test. The Soviets also delivered a weapon-ready design for the RDS-37. On the American side of the arms race, the bombs being tested were remotely detonated. "The test was the culmination of many years of labor, a triumph that has opened the way to the development of a whole range of devices with diverse high-performance characteristics." The report on the RDS-37, written by Zel'dovich and Sakharov, stated that the new principle of atomic compression as seen in the RDS-37 was a "shining example of creative teamwork." The report boasted enormous amounts of design-oriented, experimental and technological efforts carried out under the supervision of Design Bureau 11's chief designer, Khariton.

The successful detonation of the first two-stage thermonuclear weapon was an important moment in the Soviet Union's nuclear weapons program and helped shape the path of the program. It had shown that the gap between the United States and the Soviet Union was closing. More importantly, the nuclear yield gap had been closed. It was now a race between the nations to perfect the bomb, making it lighter, reliable, and more compact. Now, 22 November 1955, marked the date where the Soviet Union possessed a weapon that could destroy any target in the United States.

The thermonuclear weapons race between the United States and the Soviet Union progressed beyond the initial expectations of the participating scientists. The successful and promising work from both the United States and the Soviet Union spurred each country to push for more powerful weapons, as the floodgates of thermonuclear weapon potential had been opened. This was the norm at the time considering that the Cold War was in full swing. It was a significant boost to Soviet morale knowing that the Soviet Union's physicists, engineers, scientist, and great minds were able to not only compete with the Americans, but also able to outperform them in some key areas of weapon and technological development.

The RDS program gave rise to the genius of Andrei Sakharov, who undoubtedly was the driving force behind the Soviet thermonuclear weapons development program. During his time at Design Bureau 11, Sakharov formulated the most critical ideas for the advancement of Soviet thermonuclear projects. RDS-37 gave Sakharov a lot of credibility and prestige among his co-workers and superiors. Following his success, he was given more autonomy in his research and made significant contributions in the realm of nuclear weaponry (and industry). His studies and theories on magnetic plasma confinement and on the magnetic thermonuclear reactor eventually led to the introduction of large electromagnetic pulse devices and laser fusion. Many of Sakharov's works and proposed ideas during his time working on the RDS projects are still ongoing today.

Video showing the detonation of RDS-37 is often confused with video of the Tsar Bomba, although they can be quite similar. RDS-37 videos have the detonation in the center, and Tsar Bomba videos have the detonation to the right (except for the mushroom-cloud video, which is in the center). In addition, the RDS-37 test occurred in the Semipalatinsk test area, and some of the video looks across the roofs of the secret city of Kurchatov, aka Semipalatinsk-16. The Tsar occurred over the southern half of the Arctic island of Novaya Zemlya, with no similar population centers within hundreds of kilometers at that time.

== See also ==
- RDS-1
- Soviet atomic bomb project
- RDS-3
- RDS-4
- RDS-5
- RDS-202, АN-602 (rus. AH-602) (Tsar Bomba)
- Ivy Mike (first US hydrogen bomb)
- Castle Bravo (first US staged dry-fuel design)

== Bibliography ==
- Bethe, H. A. (1995). "Bombs After Hiroshima". Science. 269 (5229): 1455–1457. Bibcode:1995Sci...269.1455R. doi:10.1126/science.269.5229.1455. ISSN 0036-8075. S2CID 120646380.
- Bernstein, Jeremy (2010). "John von Neumann and Klaus Fuchs: An Unlikely Collaboration". Physics in Perspective. 35 (1): 36–50. Bibcode:2010PhP....12...36B. doi:10.1007/s00016-009-0001-1. S2CID 121790196.
- Goncharov, German A. (1996p). "American and Soviet H-bomb development programmes: historical background" (PDF). Physics-Uspekhi. 39 (10): 1033–1044. Bibcode:1996PhyU...39.1033G. doi:10.1070/PU1996v039n10ABEH000174. S2CID 250861572.
- Goncharov, German A. (1996). "Thermonuclear Milestones: (2) Beginnings of the Soviet H-Bomb Program". Physics Today. 49 (11): 50–56. Bibcode:1996PhT....49k..50G. doi:10.1063/1.881549. ISSN 0031-9228.
- Goncharov, German A. (1996b). "Thermonuclear Milestones: (3) The Race Accelerates". Physics Today. 49 (11): 56–61. Bibcode:1996PhT....49k..56G. doi:10.1063/1.881532. ISSN 0031-9228.
- Goncharov, German A (2005). "The extraordinarily beautiful physical principle of thermonuclear charge design (on the occasion of the 50th anniversary of the test of RDS-37 – the first Soviet two-stage thermonuclear charge)". Physics-Uspekhi. 48 (11): 1187–1196. Bibcode:2005PhyU...48.1187G. doi:10.1070/PU2005v048n11ABEH005839. ISSN 1063-7869. S2CID 250820514.
- Holloway, David (1995). Stalin and the Bomb: The Soviet Union and Atomic Energy 1939–1956. Yale University Press. ISBN 0-300-06664-3.
- Ilkaev, Radii I (2012). "Sakharov at KB-11. The Path of a Genius". Uspekhi Fizicheskikh Nauk. 55 (2): 183. Bibcode:2012PhyU...55..183I. doi:10.3367/UFNe.0182.201202i.0195. S2CID 204008101.
- Ilkaev, Radii I (2013). "Major stages of the Atomic Project". Physics-Uspekhi. 56 (5): 502–509. Bibcode:2013PhyU...56..502I. doi:10.3367/UFNe.0183.201305h.0528. ISSN 1063-7869. S2CID 204012111.
- Khariton, Yu B; Adamskii, V B; Smirnov, Yu N (1996). "On the making of the Soviet hydrogen (thermonuclear) bomb". Physics-Uspekhi. 39 (2): 185–189. Bibcode:1996PhyU...39..185K. doi:10.1070/PU1996v039n02ABEH000134. ISSN 1063-7869. S2CID 250843396.
- Kojevnikov, Alexei (2004). Stalin's Great Science: The Times and Adventures of Soviet Physicists. Imperial College Press. ISBN 1-86094-420-5.
- Rhodes, Richard (1995). Dark Sun: The Making of the Hydrogen Bomb. Simon and Schuster. ISBN 0-684-80400-X.
- Sakharov, Andreĭ D (1992). Memoirs. New York: Vintage Books. ISBN 067973595X.
- Zaloga, Steve (2002). The Kremlin's Nuclear Sword: The Rise and Fall of Russia's Strategic Nuclear Forces 1945–2000. Smithsonian Books. ISBN 1-58834-007-4.
- Goetz, Peter (2018). A Technical History of America's Nuclear Arms Volume 1. Independently Published. ISBN 978-1719831963.
