= Sarov =

Closed town in Nizhny Novgorod Oblast, Russia

Sarov Саров
- Town
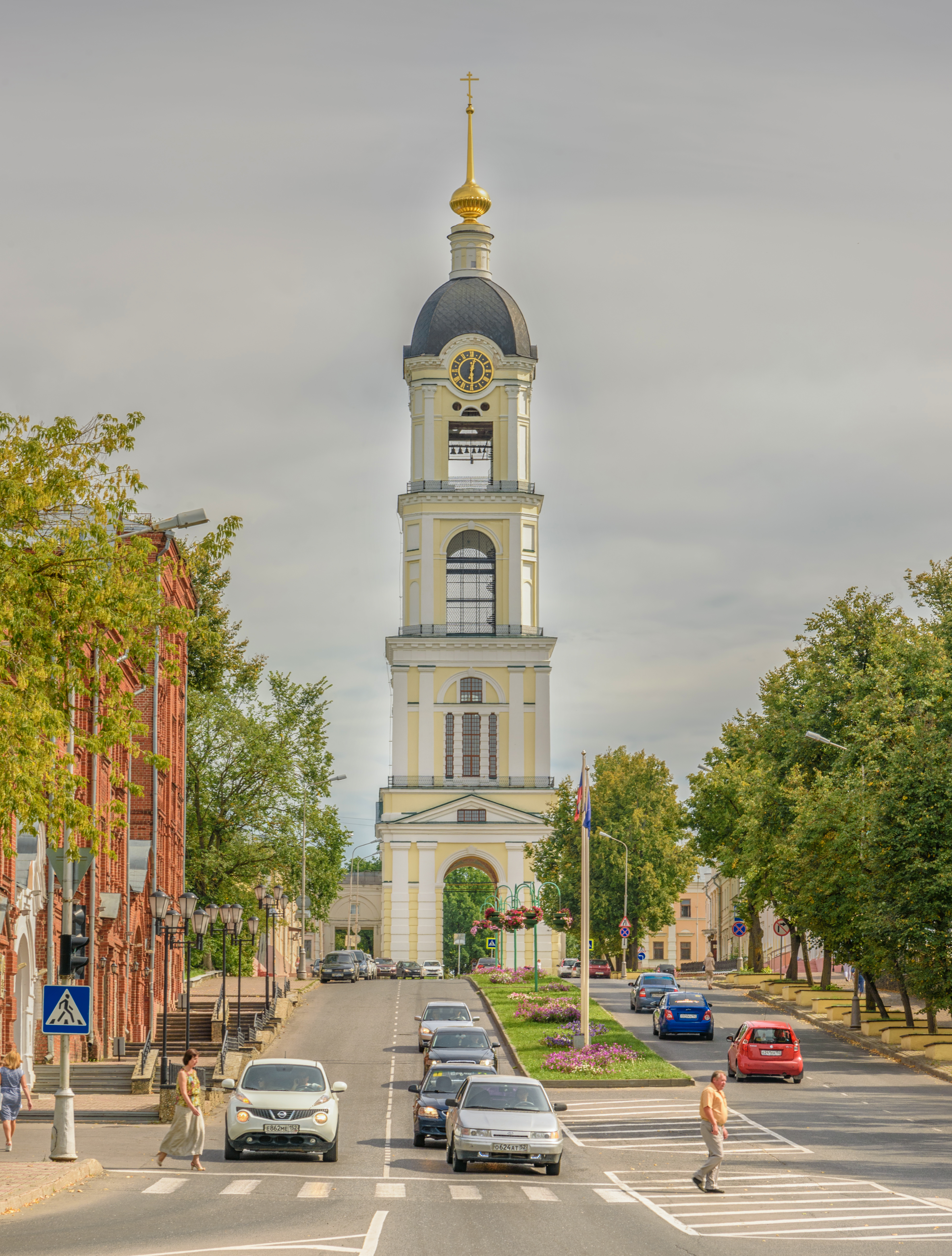
- Bell tower of Sarov Monastery

- Coat of arms
- Interactive map of Sarov
- Location of Sarov Sarov (Nizhny Novgorod Oblast)
- Coordinates: 54°56′N 43°19′E
- Country: Russia
- Federal subject: Nizhny Novgorod Oblast
- Founded: 1691
- Town status since: 1954
- Elevation: 160 m (520 ft)

Population
  - Estimate (2025): 93,493 )

Administrative status
  - Subordinated to: town of oblast significance of Sarov
  - Capital of: town of oblast significance of Sarov

Municipal status
  - Urban okrug: Sarov Urban District (closed administrative territorial object)
  - Capital of: Sarov Urban Okrug
- Time zone: UTC+3 (MSK)
- Postal code: 607188
- Dialing code: +7 83130
- OKTMO ID: 22704000001
- Website: www.adm.sarov.ru

Sarov (Russian: Саро́в) is a closed town in Nizhny Novgorod Oblast, Russia. It was known as Gorkiy-130 (Горький-130) and Arzamas-16 (Арзама́с-16), after a (somewhat) nearby town of Arzamas, from 1946 to 1991. Until 1995, it was known as Kremlyov/Kremlev/Kremljov (Кремлёв). The town is closed because it is the Russian center for nuclear research. Population: 92,047 (2010 Census); 87,652 (2002 Census)

== History ==
The history of the town can be divided into two different periods. In the earlier history of Russia it was known as one of the holy places of the Russian Orthodox Church, because of its monastery, that gave Russia one of its greatest saints, Saint Seraphim. Since the 1940s, it has gradually become the center for research and production of Soviet and later Russian nuclear weapons.

The history of human settlement in the area around Sarov goes back at least to the 12th–13th centuries, when a large Mordvin settlement was founded on its spot. In 1298, the town was taken over by Tatars.

The modern town took its name from being the site of the Sarov Monastery next to the Sarov River. In 1664, an Orthodox monk Theodosius first settled on the Sarov hill. The first Church of Sarov tenement was founded in 1706. Saint Seraphim was living in Sarov from 1778 to 1833. In 1903, the monastery was visited by Tsar Nicholas II and other members of the royal family. At that time the monastery had nine churches, including one underground. Around 320 monks lived in the monastery.

In 1923, the monastery was closed, and the monks were executed by the Bolsheviks. During World War II, the monastery buildings were used as factories for producing rockets for BM-13 "Katyusha" rocket launchers.

In 1946, the All-Union Scientific Research Institute of Experimental Physics—a nuclear weapons design facility that would become known in the West under the acronym VNIIEF—was built. Sarov became a closed city. It was removed from all unclassified maps. Initial provisional names included Base 112, Site 550, Yasnogorsk, Kremlyev and Arzamas-75. Sarov was known as Arzamas-16 until 1995. In 1954, Arzamas-16 was granted town status.

The town is home to the Russian Federation Nuclear Center and "Atomic Bomb" museum which has a number of casings of Soviet-era nuclear weapons and photographs of those involved in their production. The main access is by train, which, after a security stop and inspection, is allowed into the town to disembark passengers. The small Sarov Airport is generally for government aircraft only, and visitors usually fly to Nizhny Novgorod airport and then drive.

The town is surrounded by fences patrolled by the military. Foreigners, and even Russians who do not live in Sarov, are not allowed to enter the town without permission. Foreigners who visit on business must surrender their passports, phones, and cameras to security while they are in the facility, though some documentary filmmakers have shot footage inside the town walls.

A large portion of the town is located on the grounds of the P.G.S. State Park in adjacent Temnikovsky District of the Republic of Mordovia.

In 1993, the town became a sister city to Los Alamos, New Mexico, the home of the U.S. nuclear weapons design laboratory (Los Alamos National Laboratory, or LANL). Scientists from LANL and VNIIEF have cooperated on various arms control and nuclear safeguards programs, under which the Los Alamos scientists learned, to their amusement, that their Russian colleagues paid homage to their American rivals by irreverently calling their own laboratory "Los Arzamas."

Boris Yeltsin changed the town's name back to Sarov at the request of the residents in August 1995.

On 17 June 1997, a Russian Federal Nuclear Center senior researcher Alexandr Zakharov received a fatal dose of 4850 rem in a criticality accident.

Today, the Russian federal nuclear center is responsible for important decisions concerning the development, production, storage, and utilization of nuclear weapons; the recycling of radioactive and other materials; and research in fundamental and applied physics. International foundations have helped to fund some research scientists in Sarov following the downsizing and transitions after the Soviet era. The city's fences and the electrified fences around fissile stores are maintained. In 1998, a resident stated that the perimeter fences also kept the city free from organized crime.

During the 2010 Russian wildfires, the Russian Army took preventive forest fire measures and radioactive material was reported to have been secured elsewhere.

On 12 August 2019, flags in Sarov were lowered to half-mast during the viewing of five coffins in Sarov's main square. These were the bodies of five Rosatom workers who were killed during the Nyonoksa radiation accident that happened on 8 August 2019 near Severodvinsk at the State Central Navy Testing Range, which is the main rocket launching site of the Russian Navy. Later, the bodies of the Rosatom workers, who were involved in the development and testing of the 9M730 Burevestnik (Petrel) also known as by the NATO reporting name SSC-X-9 Skyfall, were buried in Sarov's main cemetery.

History of Sarov

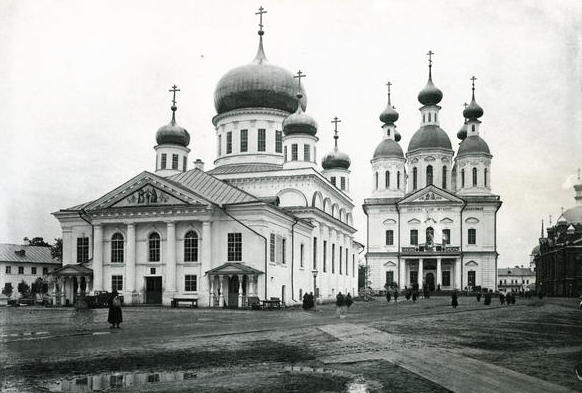
Sarov Monastery in 1910

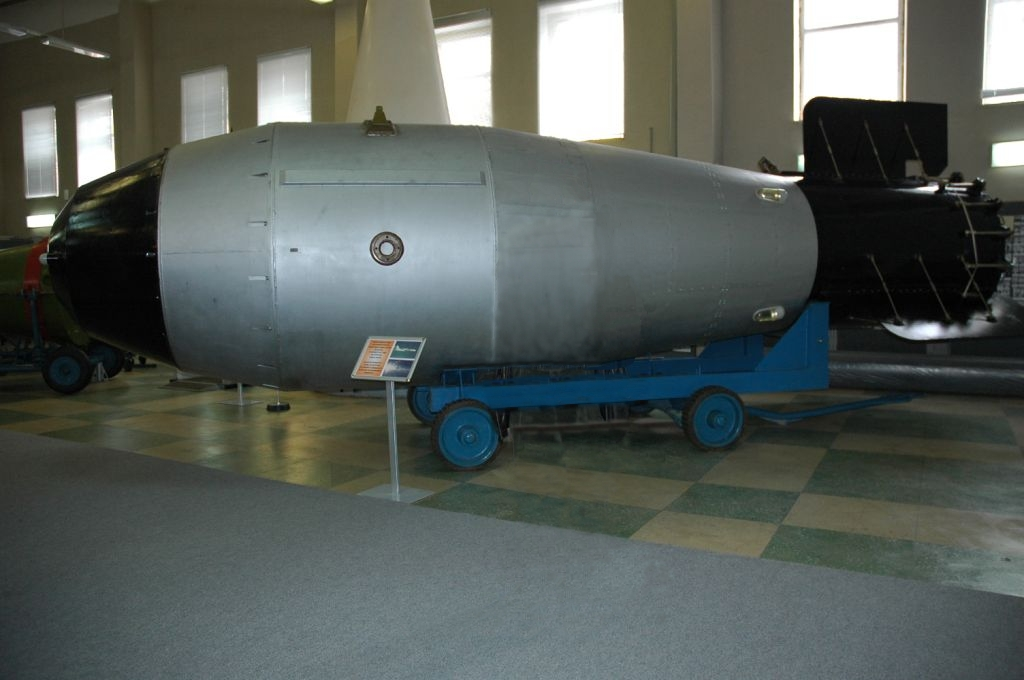
Model of the "Tsar Bomba" in the Sarov atomic bomb museum

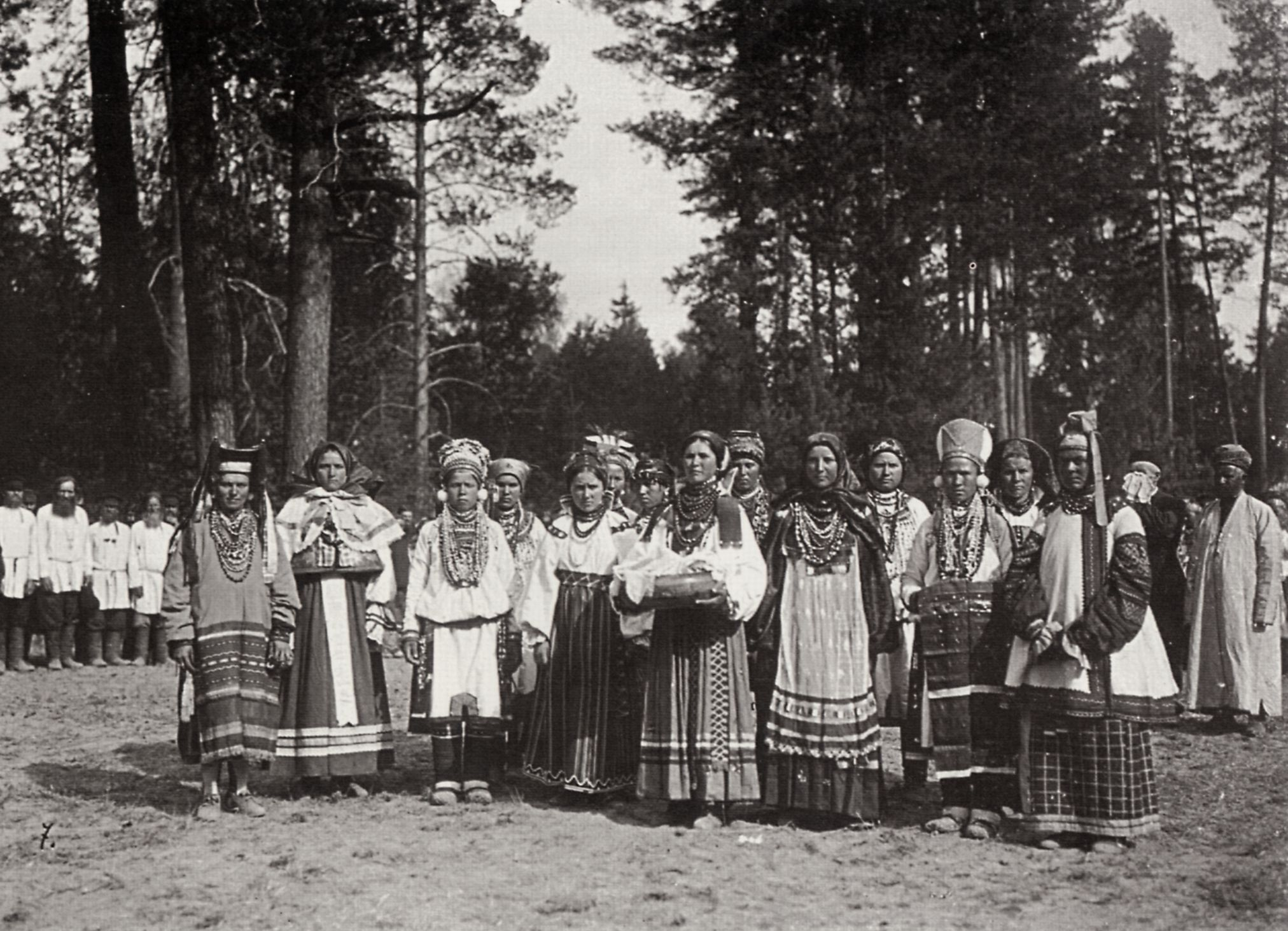
Russian women meet Tsar Nicholas II in Sarov 1903

== Administrative and municipal status ==
Within the framework of administrative divisions, it is incorporated as the town of oblast significance of Sarov—an administrative unit with the status equal to that of the districts. As a municipal division, the town of oblast significance of Sarov is incorporated as Sarov Urban Okrug.

== Notable people ==
- Seraphim of Sarov (1754/1759–1833), Russian Orthodox starets and saint
- Oleg Taktarov - mixed martial artist and UFC 6 champion
- Yulii Khariton - leading scientist in the Soviet Union's nuclear weapons program
- Tatiana Sorokko - fashion model
- Anton Silayev - ice hockey player

== International relations ==
=== Twin towns and sister cities ===
Sarov is twinned with:

- Los Alamos, New Mexico, United States
- New Athos, Abkhazia (de jure Georgia)

== See also ==
- Soviet atomic bomb project
- Nunn–Lugar Cooperative Threat Reduction
