= All-Russian Scientific Research Institute of Experimental Physics =

Research institute based in Sarov, Russia

Coordinates: 54°55′N 43°20′E

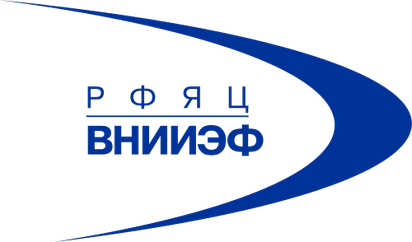
- Type: Federal State Unitary Enterprise
- Founded: 1947
- Headquarters: Sarov, Russia
- Number of employees: 20,000 (2023)
- Parent: Rosatom
- Website: www.vniief.ru

The All-Russian Scientific Research Institute of Experimental Physics (VNIIEF; Russian: Всероссийский научно-исследовательский институт экспериментальной физики) is a research institute based in Sarov (formerly Arzamas-16), Russia and established in 1947. During the Soviet era, it was known as KB-11 and All-Soviet (All-Union) Scientific Research Institute of Experimental Physics (also abbreviated VNIIEF) (Russian: Всесоюзный научно-исследовательский институт экспериментальной физики, ВНИИЭФ). It is currently part of the Rosatom group.

The All-Russian Scientific Research Institute of Experimental Physics is the former Soviet Union's premier research and development center for nuclear weapons. The first Soviet atomic bomb was developed here in the late 1940s, after which the center continued as a center for nuclear weapons research.

Many of the Soviet Union's best physicists were associated with Arzamas-16: Academician Andrey D. Sakharov worked here for nearly 20 years, and Academician Yuliy B. Khariton still served as the Center's scientific head in the 1990s.

Before being given its current name, the facility was successively known as the Volga Office, KB-11, Object No. 550 (Site 550), "Kremlev" (Kremlyev), "Center 300, Moscow", Arzamas-75 and Arzamas-16. Other initial provisional names included Base 112 and Yasnogorsk. The researchers working there have sometimes referred to the place as "Los Arzamas" (after the American nuclear research facility Los Alamos).

As of August 2019, the Research Institute of Experimental Physics was a very large research complex with these institutes: Theoretical and mathematical physics (Russian: теоретической и математической физики), Gas dynamics and explosion physics (Russian: Газодинамики и физики взрыва), Nuclear and radiation physics (Russian: Ядерной и радиационной физики), Laser physical research (Russian: Лазерно-физических исследований), and the Scientific and Technical Complex (Russian: Научно-технический комплекс) also known as the KB (Russian: КБ), which consists of KB-1 (nuclear charges) (Russian: КБ-1 (ядерные заряды)), KB-2 (nuclear munitions) (Russian: КБ-2 (ядерные боеприпасы)), KB-3 (special security) (Russian: КБ-3 (специальная безопасность)), and KB-12 (special topics) (Russian: КБ-12 (специальная тематика)).

== History ==
On February 11, 1943, a resolution was adopted by the State Defense Committee to begin work on the creation of an atomic bomb. The general leadership was entrusted to the Deputy Chairman of the State Defense Committee Lavrentiy Beria, who, in turn, appointed the head of the atomic project Igor Kurchatov (his appointment was signed on March 10). The information received through intelligence channels facilitated and accelerated the work of Soviet scientists.

Beginning at the end of 1945, a search began for a location for a secret facility, which would later be named KB-11. According to the memoirs of the academician Yulii Khariton, the place for the future institute was researched carefully: it had to be located at a distance from the cities, since it was required to test various explosive structures so that active plutonium could be compressed and when combined, would exceed critical mass. Having reviewed many locations, physicists came across a completely satisfying place in the former Sarov Monastery (a famous saint that lived in the monastery, the Saint Seraphim of Sarov, later became a patron saint of Russia's nuclear weapons) not far from Arzamas (hence the names Arzamas-75 and Arzamas-16), on the border with the Mordovian reserve. On the territory of the monastery, there was plant number 550 (hence the names Site 550 etc.), which produced mortar shells, guns, rockets for BM-13 "Katyusha" rocket launchers, and other types of weapons. Behind the wall of the monastery there was a protected forest (the nature reserve is still very near to the Sarov closed city) for hundreds of square kilometers, where test explosions could be carried out unnoticed. Boris Vannikov commissioned a survey of the plant and on April 1, 1946 Sarov was chosen as the location of the first Soviet “nuclear center,” later famously known as “Arzamas-16.”

On April 9, 1946, a resolution was adopted by the Council of Ministers of the USSR- No. 805-327ss on the creation of KB-11 at Laboratory No. 2 of the USSR Academy of Sciences (Kurchatov Institute). Pavel Mikhailovich Zernov was appointed Head of KB-11 at the suggestion of Yu.B. Khariton, and the chief designer was Yulii Khariton.

Construction of KB-11 on the plant No. 550 base in the village of Sarov was entrusted to Glavpromstroy by the People's Commissariat of Internal Affairs of the USSR. To carry out all the construction work, a special construction organization was created - Construction Department No. 880 of the NKVD of the USSR. Since April 1946, the entire personnel of the plant No. 550 were enlisted as workers and employees of the Construction Department No. 880. In addition to civilian workers, the main contingent consisted of prisoners. On 07/01/1947, the number of prisoners in the labor camp at SU-880 was 10,098, of which 9044 were men and 1,054 were women.

In February 1947, by the decree of the Council of Ministers of the USSR KB-11 was classified as a highly restricted enterprise and was transformed from a territory into a closed restricted zone. The settlement of Sarov was removed from the administrative structure of the Mordovian Autonomous Soviet Socialist Republic and excluded from all records. Research laboratories and design departments of KB-11 began to develop their activities directly in Sarov in the spring of 1947. At the same time, the first production shops of experimental plants No. 1 and No. 2 were created.

On March 3, 1949, the Council of Ministers of the USSR adopted decree No. 863-327ss/op on the construction of the USSR's first plant for the industrial production of atomic bombs as part of KB-11 in 1949-1950.

On June 6, 1950, KB-11 was transferred from the Laboratory of Measuring Instruments of the USSR Academy of Sciences to the direct jurisdiction of The First Main Directorate under the USSR Council of Ministers, on the basis of which, in turn, on July 1, 1953, the Ministry of Medium Machine Building was formed.

By the end of 1951, the experimental mass production plant No. 551, which came into operation in the second half of 1951 (plant No. 3 KB-11), produced 29 atomic bombs RDS-1. The storage of atomic bombs was also carried out on the territory of KB-11 in a specially erected underground reinforced concrete storage warehouse.

In 1967, KB-11 was transformed into the All-Union Scientific Research Institute of Experimental Physics, which became part of the structure of the USSR Ministry of Medium Machine Building.

Since February 1992, it is called the - Russian Federal Nuclear Center - All-Russian Scientific Research Institute of Experimental Physics (RFNC-VNIIEF). It is a federal state unitary enterprise of the nuclear weapons complex of the State Atomic Energy Corporation Rosatom (SC Rosatom).

== Supercomputer ==
On March 9, 2011, a supercomputer was officially put into operation at RFNC-VNIIEF - the most powerful supercomputer at that time in Russia.

On 9 February 2018, Interfax reported that several employees of the All-Russian Research Institute of Experimental Physics (RFNC-VNIIEF) were detained because they had used the power of the greater than 1 petaflops supercomputer to mine cryptocurrencies on 8 February 2018.

By 2018-2020, it was planned to increase the capacity of the supercomputer to 1 exaflop.

== Nyonoksa radiation accident on 8 August 2019 and the deaths of five employees of RFNC-VNIIEF ==
Among the many research and developments the RFNC-VNIIEF has supported included the development of the "isotope power source for a liquid-fuelled rocket engine" which caused a failed test on 8 August 2019 producing the Nyonoksa radiation accident involving a 9M730 Burevestnik at the Nyonoksa navy test range and resulted in the deaths of five employees of RFNC-VNIIEF: Alexey Vyushin, Evgeny Korataev, Vyacheslav Lipshev, Sergey Pichugin and Vladislav Yanovsky, according to a 15 August 2019 Izvestia article.

== Members ==
Directors:

- Pavel Mikhailovich Zernov (1946)
- Valentin Efimovich Kostyukov (с 2008)

Scientific advisers:

- Yulii Borisovich Khariton (1952—1992)
- Viktor Nikitovich Mikhaylov (1993—2008)
- Vyacheslav Petrovich Soloviev (с 2017)

As of March 2005, about 24 thousand people worked in the Nuclear Center, of which over 44% were women. VNIIEF has 527 candidates of sciences, of whom 36 are women. Of the 102 doctors of sciences, three are women: Galina Vladimirovna Dolgoleva, Vera Vladimirovna Rasskazova, and Lyudmila Valentinovna Fomicheva.

== See also ==
- Bibliography of science and technology in Russia and the Soviet Union
- All-Russian Scientific Research Institute Of Technical Physics
- NL Dukhov All-Russian Research Institute of Automation
- Soviet atomic bomb project
- Los Alamos National Laboratory
- Lawrence Livermore National Laboratory
- Sandia National Laboratories
