= Yakov Zeldovich =

Soviet physicist, physical chemist and cosmologist (1914–1987)

- Яков Зельдович
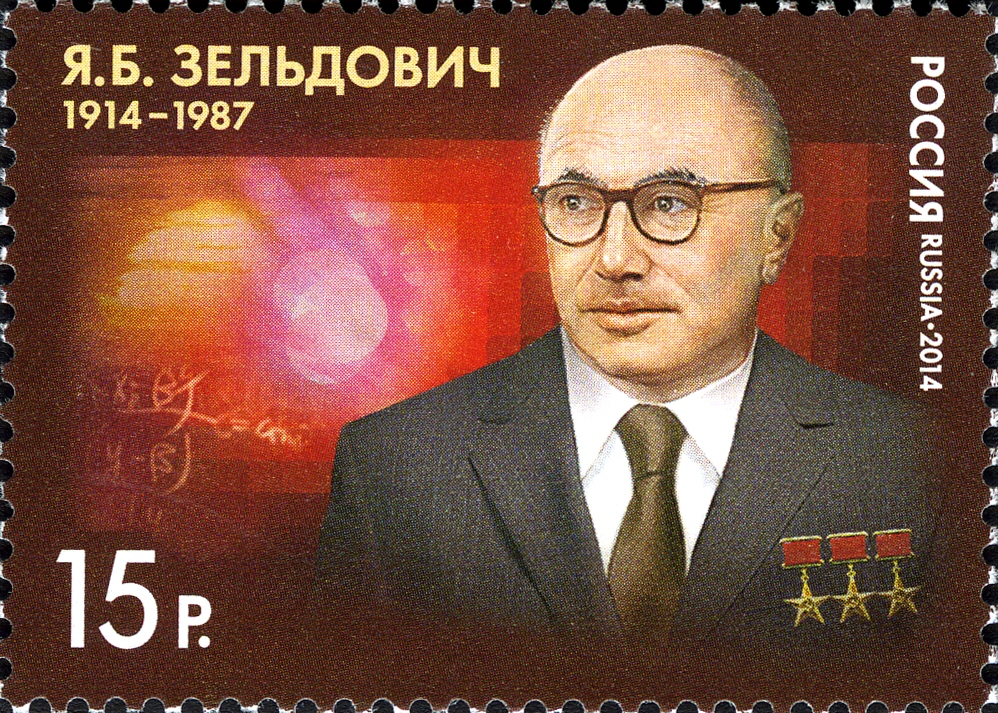
- Zeldovich on a 2014 Russian Post stamp
- Born: Yakov Borisovich Zeldovich (Я́ков Бори́сович Зельдо́вич); 8 March 1914; Minsk, Minsk Governorate, Russian Empire (now Minsk in Belarus)
- Died: 2 December 1987 (aged 73); Moscow, Russia, Soviet Union
- Resting place: Novodevichy Cemetery in Moscow
- Siglum: YaB
- Citizenship: USSR
- Education: Saint Petersburg State University
- Known for: Sunyaev–Zeldovich effect; ZND detonation model; Zeldovich approximation; Zeldovich amplification; Zeldovich equation of state; Zeldovich factor; Zeldovich mechanism; Zeldovich number; Zeldovich pancake; Zeldovich radiation; Zeldovich antidynamo theorem; Harrison–Zeldovich spectrum; Zeldovich streaming model; Zeldovich regularization; Zeldovich spontaneous wave; Zeldovich–Liñán–Dold model; Zeldovich–Taylor flow; BZT fluid; Shvab–Zeldovich formulation; ZFK equation; von Weizsäcker–Zeldovich problem; LSZK EOS; Pauli–Zeldovich cancellation; Activation energy asymptotics; Diffusive–thermal instability; Gravitational memory effect; Method of matched asymptotic expansions; Primordial black hole; Self-similar solution of the second kind; Vector current conservation hypothesis
- Awards: Friedmann Prize (2002); Dirac Medal (1985); Gold Medal of the Royal Astronomical Society (1983); Bruce Medal (1983); Kurchatov Medal (1977); Lenin Prize (1957); Hero of Socialist Labor (1949, 1954, 1956)
- Scientific career
- Fields: Physics
- Workplaces: Institute of Chemical Physics; Moscow State University; Sternberg Astronomical Institute
- Thesis: Theory of Nitrogen Oxidation (1939)
- Doctoral advisor: Aleksandr Frumkin
- Doctoral students: Sergei Kopeikin; Marina Romanova
- Other notable students: Rashid Sunyaev; Roman Juszkiewicz; Igor Novikov; Sergei Shandarin; Alexei Starobinsky; Vladimir M. Lipunov; Victor Shvartsman; Varun Sahni; Deborah Dultzin

Yakov Borisovich Zeldovich ForMemRS (Russian: Я́ков Бори́сович Зельдо́вич, Belarusian: Я́каў Бары́савіч Зяльдо́віч; 8 March 1914 – 2 December 1987), also known as YaB, was a leading Soviet physicist of Belarusian origin, who is known for his prolific contributions in physical cosmology, physics of thermonuclear reactions, combustion, and hydrodynamical phenomena.

From 1943, Zeldovich, a self-taught physicist, started his career by playing a crucial role in the development of the former Soviet program of nuclear weapons. In 1963, he returned to academia to embark on pioneering contributions on the fundamental understanding of the thermodynamics of black holes and expanding the scope of physical cosmology.

== Biography ==
=== Early life and education ===
Yakov Zeldovich was born into a Belarusian Jewish family in his grandfather's house in Minsk. However, in mid-1914, the Zeldovich family moved to Saint Petersburg. They resided there until August 1941, when the family was evacuated together with the faculty of the Institute of Chemical Physics to Kazan to avoid the Axis Invasion of the Soviet Union. They remained in Kazan until the summer of 1943, when Zeldovich moved to Moscow.

His father, Boris Naumovich Zeldovich, was a lawyer; his mother, Anna Petrovna Zeldovich (née Kiveliovich), a translator from French to Russian, was a member of the Writer's Union. Despite being born into a devoted and religious Jewish family, Zeldovich was an "absolute atheist".

Zeldovich was an autodidact. He was regarded as having a remarkably versatile intellect, and during his life he explored and made major contributions to a wide range of scientific endeavors. From a given opportunity in May 1931, he secured an appointment as a laboratory assistant at the Institute of Chemical Physics of the Academy of Sciences of the Soviet Union, and remained associated with the institute for the remainder of his life. As a laboratory assistant, he received preliminary instructions on the topics involved in the physical chemistry and built up his reputation among his seniors at the Institute of Chemical Physics.

From 1932 to 1934, Zeldovich attended the undergraduate courses on physics and mathematics at the Leningrad State University (now Saint Petersburg State University), and later attended the technical lectures on introductory physics at the Leningrad Polytechnic Institute (now Peter the Great St. Petersburg Polytechnic University).

In 1936, he was successful in his candidacy for the Candidate of Science degree (a Soviet equivalent of PhD), having successfully defended his dissertation on the topic of the "adsorption and catalysis on heterogeneous surfaces". The centrality of his thesis focused towards the research on the Freundlich (or classical) adsorption isotherm, and Zeldovich discovered the theoretical foundation of this empirical observation.

In 1939, Zeldovich prepared his dissertation based on the mathematical theory of the physical interpretation of nitrogen oxidation, and successfully received the Doctor of Sciences in mathematical physics when it was reviewed by Alexander Frumkin. Zeldovich discovered its mechanism, known in physical chemistry as the thermal NO_{x} mechanism or Zeldovich mechanism.

=== Soviet program of nuclear weapons ===
Zeldovich is regarded as a secret principal of the Soviet nuclear weapons project; his travels abroad were highly restricted, to Eastern Europe, under close Soviet security. Soon after the discovery of nuclear fission (by German chemist Otto Hahn in 1939) Russian physicists had begun investigating the scope of nuclear-fission physics, and undertook seminars on that topic; Igor Kurchatov and Yulii Khariton were engaged in 1940.

In May 1941, Zeldovich worked with Khariton in constructing a theory, on the kinetics of nuclear reactions in the presence of the critical conditions. The work of Khariton and Zeldovich was extended into theories of ignition, combustion and detonation; these accounted for features which had not previously been correctly predicted, observed, nor explained. The modern theory of detonation accordingly is called the Zeldovich-von Neumann-Dohring, or ZND, theory, and its development involved tedious fast neutron calculations; this work had been delayed, due to the German invasion of the Soviet Union, which obstructed progress on findings that in June 1941 would be de-classified. In 1942, Zeldovich was relocated to Kazan, and tasked by the People's Commissariat of Munitions to carry out work on conventional gun powders to be supplied to the Soviet Army, while Khariton was asked to design the new types of conventional weaponry.

In 1943, Joseph Stalin decided to launch an arms build-up of nuclear weapons, under the charge of Igor Kurchatov; the latter requested Stalin to relocate Zeldovich and Khariton to Moscow, in the nuclear weapons program. Zeldovich joined Igor Kurchatov's small team at this secretive laboratory in Moscow to launch the work on the nuclear combustion theory, and became a head of the theoretical department at the Arzamas-16 in 1946.

With Isai Gurevich, Isaak Pomeranchuk, and Khariton, Zeldovich prepared a scientific report on the feasibility of releasing energy through nuclear fusion triggered by an atomic explosion, and presented it to Igor Kurchatov. Zeldovich had benefitted from physical and technical knowledge provided by German physicist Klaus Fuchs and American physicist Theodore Hall, who each had worked on the American Manhattan Project to develop nuclear weapons.

In 1949, Zeldovich led a team of physicists that conducted the first nuclear test, the RDS-1, based roughly on the American design obtained through the atomic spies in the United States, though he continued his fundamental work on explosive theory. Zeldovich then began working on modernizing the successive designs of the nuclear weapon and initially conceived the idea of hydrogen bomb to Andrei Sakharov and others. In the course of his work on nuclear weapons, Zeldovich did ground-breaking work in radiation hydrodynamics, and the physics of matter at high pressure.

Between 1950 and 1953, Zeldovich performed calculations necessary for the feasibility of the hydrogen bomb that were verified by Andrei Sakharov, although the two groups worked in parallel on the development of the thermonuclear fusion. However, it was Sakharov that radically changed the approach to thermonuclear fusion, aided by Vitaly Ginzburg in 1952. He remained associated with the nuclear testing program, while heading the experimental laboratories at Arzamas-16 until October 1963, when he left for academia.

In October 1973, at the height of the Yom Kippur War, and having heard rumors of an impending Soviet nuclear strike on Israel, left a letter with fellow Soviet Jewish physicist Ilya Lifshitz in the event of a strike, in which case he intended to commit suicide.

== Academia and cosmology ==
In 1952, Zeldovich began work in the field of elementary particles and their transformations. He predicted the beta decay of a pi meson. Together with Semyon Gershtein he noticed the analogy between the weak and electromagnetic interactions, and in 1960, he predicted the muon catalysis (more precisely, the muon-catalysed dt-fusion) phenomenon. In 1977, Zeldovich together with Fyodor Shapiro was awarded the Kurchatov Medal, the highest award in nuclear physics of the Soviet Union. The citation was "for prediction of characteristics of ultracold neutrons, their detection and investigation". He was elected academician of the USSR Academy of Sciences on 20 June 1958. He was a head of division at the Institute of the Applied Mathematics of the USSR Academy of Sciences from 1965 until January 1983.

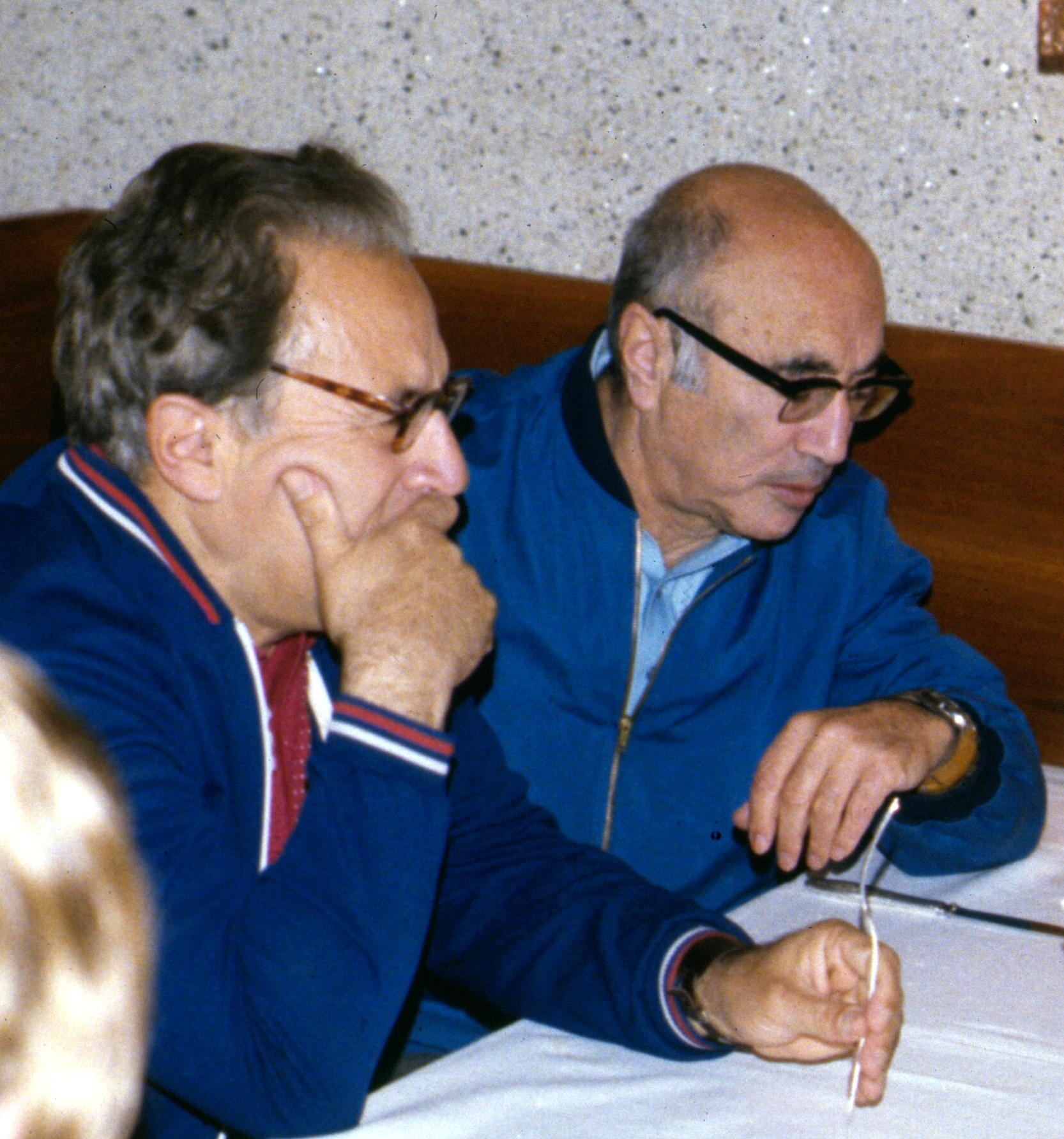
Zeldovich (right) with astrophysicist Iosif Shklovsky in 1977

In early 1960s, Zeldovich started working in astrophysics and physical cosmology. In 1964, he and independently Edwin Salpeter were the first to suggest that accretion discs around massive black holes are responsible for the huge amounts of energy radiated by quasars. From 1965, he was a professor at the Department of Physics of the Moscow State University and a head of the division of Relativistic Astrophysics at the Sternberg Astronomical Institute. In 1966, he and Igor Novikov were the first to propose searching for black hole candidates among binary systems in which one star is optically bright and X-ray dark and the other optically dark but X-ray bright (the black hole candidate).

Zeldovich worked on the theory of the evolution of the hot universe, the properties of the microwave background radiation, the large-scale structure of the universe, and the theory of black holes. He predicted, with Rashid Sunyaev, that the cosmic microwave background should undergo inverse Compton scattering. This is called the Sunyaev-Zeldovich effect, and measurements by telescopes such as the Atacama Cosmology Telescope and the South Pole Telescope has established it as one of the key observational probes of cluster cosmology. Zeldovich contributed sharp insights into the nature of the large scale structure of the universe, in particular, through the use of Lagrangian perturbation theory (the Zeldovich approximation) and the application of the Burgers' equation approach via the adhesion approximation.

In 1974, in collaboration with A. G. Polnarev, suggested the existence of a gravitational memory effect, for which a system of freely falling particles initially at relative rest are displaced after the passing of a burst of gravitational radiation.

=== Black hole thermodynamics ===
Zeldovich played a key role in developing the theory of black hole evaporation due to Hawking radiation. Zeldovich and Charles W. Misner concomitantly predicted the possibility of particle generation by rotating Kerr black holes in 1971, 1972. Previously, In 1965, Zeldovich had predicted that Kerr black holes would split the emission lines of photons as in a Zeeman effect. During Stephen Hawking's visit to Moscow in 1973, Soviet scientists Zeldovich and Alexei Starobinsky showed Hawking that, according to the quantum mechanical uncertainty principle, rotating black holes should create and emit particles.

== Family ==
With his wife, Varvara Pavlovna Konstantinova, Yakov Zeldovich had a son and two daughters who were also physicists: son – Boris Zeldovich; daughters – Olga Yakovlevna Zeldovich and Marina Yakovlevna Zeldovich.

Zeldovich also had a daughter, Annushka, with O.K. Shiryaeva.

He had one more daughter in 1945, Alexandra Varkovitskaya, with a linguist and folklorist Ludmila Varkovitskaya.

Zeldovich had another son with Nina Nikolaevna Agapova in 1958, whose name was Leonid Yakovlevich Agapov; he died in 2016 at the age of 58.

== Publications ==
=== Books ===
- Zelʹdovich, Yakov B.; Ruzmaikin, Alexander A. (2015). Dynamo Problems in Astrophysics. Cambridge, UK: Cambridge Scientific Publishers. ISBN 978-1-908106-44-5.
- Zel'dovich, Yakov Borisovich; Novikov, I. D. (2011). Stars and Relativity. Mineola, N.Y: Dover. ISBN 978-0-486-69424-5.
- Zel'dovich, Ya B.; Raizer, Yu. P. (2012). Physics of Shock Waves and High-Temperature Hydrodynamic Phenomena, Volume 1. Dover.
- Zel'dovich, Ya B.; Raizer, Yu. P. (2012). Physics of Shock Waves and High-Temperature Hydrodynamic Phenomena, Volume 2. Dover.
- Perelomov, A. M.; Zel'dovich, Yakov B. (1999). Quantum Mechanics: Selected Topics. Singapore: World Scientific. ISBN 978-9810235505.
- Zel'dovich, Ya B.; Myshkis, A. D. (1976). Elements of Applied Mathematics. Translated by Yankovsky, George. Mir Publishers.
- Zel'dovich, Ya B.; Myshkis, A. D. Elements of Mathematical Physics.
- Zel'dovich, Ya B. (1993). Selected Works of Yakov Borisovich Zeldovich: Particles, Nuclei, and the Universe. Princeton University Press. ISBN 978-0691087429.
- Zel'dovich, Ya B. (1992). Selected Works of Yakov Borisovich Zeldovich: Chemical Physics and Hydrodynamics. Princeton University Press. ISBN 978-0691085944.
- Zel'dovich, Ya B. (1992). My Universe: Selected Reviews. Routledge. ISBN 978-3718650040.
- Zeldovich, Yakov Borisovich; Ruzmaikin, Aleksandr Andreevich; Sokoloff, Dimitrij D. (1990). Magnetic Fields in Astrophysics. New York: Gordon and Breach. ISBN 978-0-677-22330-8.
- Zel'dovich, Yakov B.; Ruzmaikin, A.A.; Sokoloff, D.D. (1990). The Almighty Chance. Singapore: World Scientific. ISBN 978-9971-5-0917-0.
- Zeldovich, Ya. B.; Barenblatt, G. I.; Librovich, V. B.; Makhviladze, G. M. (1985). The Mathematical Theory of Combustion and Explosions. New York: Plenum Press. ISBN 978-0306109744.
- Zel'dovich, Ya.B.; Pilipetsky, N.F.; Shkunov, V.V. (1985). Principles of Phase Conjugation. Berlin Heidelberg: Springer. ISBN 978-3-662-13573-0.
- Zel'dovich, Ya B.; Novikov, I. D. (1983). Relativistic Astrophysics: Vol.2: The Structure and Evolution of the Universe. Chicago: University of Chicago Press. ISBN 978-0226979571.
- Zel'dovich, Ya B.; Novikov, I. D. (1971). Relativistic Astrophysics: Vol.1: Stars and Relativity. University of Chicago Press. ISBN 978-0226979557.
- Zel'dovich, Ya B.; Raizer, Yu. P. (1968). Elements of Gasdynamics and the Classical Theory of Shock Waves. Academic Press.
- Zel'dovich, Yakov B.; Kompaneets, A.S. (1960). Theory of Detonation. New York and London: Academic Press.
- Zel'dovich, Ya.B.; Yaglom, I.M. (1988). Higher mathematics for Beginners (Mostly Physicists and Engineers). Prentice Hall. ISBN 978-0133876482.
- Zeldovich Ya. B. (1946). Theory of shock waves and introduction to gas dynamics.

== Awards and honors ==
Igor Kurchatov called him a "genius" and Andrei Sakharov named him "a man of universal scientific interests." After the first meeting in Moscow, Stephen W. Hawking wrote to Zeldovich: "now I know that you are a real person and not a group of scientists like Bourbaki." He was a member of the American Academy of Arts and Sciences (1975), the United States National Academy of Sciences (1979), and the American Philosophical Society (1979).

- Dirac Medal of the ICTP (1985)
- Bruce Medal (1983)
- Gold Medal of the Royal Astronomical Society (1984).
- Kurchatov Medal (1977)
- Three times Hero of Socialist Labor (1949, 1953, 1957)
- Stalin Prize (1943, 1949, 1951, 1953)
- Lenin Prize (1957)
- Three Orders of Lenin (1949, 1962, 1974)
- Two Orders of the Red Banner of Labour (1945,1964)
- Order of the October Revolution (1962)
- An asteroid 11438 Zeldovich was named in his honor in 2001.
