= TU Andromedae =

Star in the constellation Andromeda

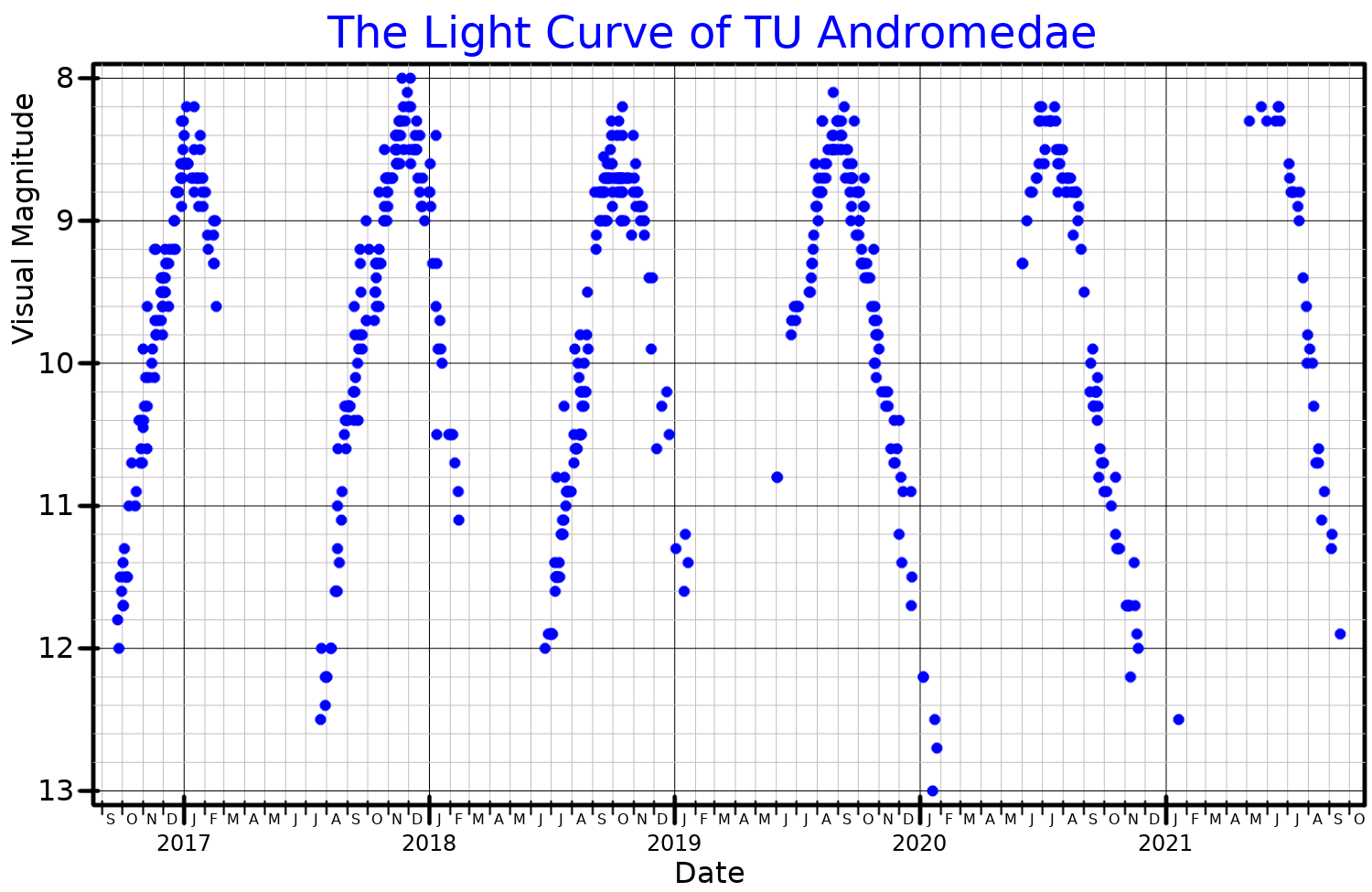
- The visual band light curve of TU Andromedae, from AAVSO data

Observation data Epoch J2000 Equinox J2000
- Constellation: Andromeda
- Right ascension: 00^{h} 32^{m} 22.72827^{s}
- Declination: +26° 01′ 45.9211″
- Apparent magnitude (V): 7.5 – 13.5

Characteristics
- Evolutionary stage: AGB
- Spectral type: M5e
- B−V color index: 0.96
- Variable type: Mira

Astrometry
| Proper motion (μ) | RA: −7.435±0.069 mas/yr Dec.: −3.136±0.057 mas/yr |
| Parallax (π) | 0.9435±0.0623 mas |
| Distance | 3,500 ± 200 ly (1,060 ± 70 pc) |

Details
| Mass | 0.87 M_{☉} |
| Luminosity | 5,200 - 5,400 L_{☉} |
| Surface gravity (log g) | −0.44 cgs |
| Temperature | 2,639 K |
| Metallicity [Fe/H] | 0.547 dex |

Other designations
- HD 2890, HIP 2546, 2MASS J00322275+2601459

Database references
| SIMBAD | data |

TU Andromedae (TU And) is a variable star of the Mira type in the constellation Andromeda. It has a spectral type of M5e and a visual magnitude which varies between extremes of 7.6 and 13.5.

TU Andromedae was discovered on photographs taken by Sergey Nikolayevich Blazhko and Lydia Ceraski in 1907 and 1908. The discovery was announced by Witold Ceraski in 1909.

Like all the stars of this kind, TU And is a cool asymptotic giant branch star, meaning it is fusing hydrogen and helium in concentric shells outside an inert core of carbon and oxygen formed earlier in its life on the horizontal branch. Its period is stable at 316.8 days.

The modelled properties of TU Andromedae at maximum brightness are not in agreement with available models of Mira stars (which work for Mira itself). It is uncertain if the problem is in the measured parameters of the star or in imperfections of the models. It had a mass between 1.15 and 1.4 M_{☉} when it was on the main sequence but is now less massive.
