= GAISH =

GAISH or Gaish may refer to:

- 14789 GAISH, a main-belt asteroid, named after the Sternberg Astronomical Institute
- Tala'ea El-Gaish SC, an Egyptian football club in Cairo
- Sternberg Astronomical Institute (GAISh), a research institution in Moscow, Russia
