= Denisenko =

Denisenko is a surname. Notable people with the surname include:

- Aleksey Denisenko (born 1993), Russian taekwondo practitioner
- Denis Denisenko (born 1971), Russian astronomer
- Grigori Denisenko (born 2000), Russian ice hockey player
- Mikhail Denisenko (1899–1949), Soviet general and Hero of the Soviet Union
