= NGC 5483 =

Galaxy in the constellation Centaurus

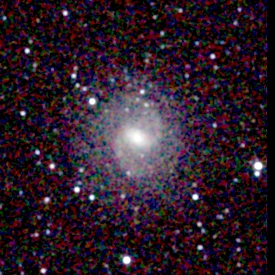
- NGC 5483 imaged in infrared by 2MASS

Observation data (J2000 epoch)
- Constellation: Centaurus
- Right ascension: 14^{h} 10^{m} 25.1016^{s}
- Declination: −43° 19′ 27.876″
- Redshift: 0.005907 ± 0.000007
- Heliocentric radial velocity: 1,771 ± 2 km/s
- Distance: 60.3 ± 10.1 Mly (18.5 ± 3.1 Mpc)
- Apparent magnitude (V): 11.2

Characteristics
- Type: SB(s)c pec
- Size: ~60,000 ly (18.5 kpc) (estimated)
- Apparent size (V): 3.7′ × 3.4′

Other designations
- ESO 271- G 019, IRAS 14072-4305, MCG -07-29-008, PGC 50600

NGC 5483 is a barred spiral galaxy in the constellation Centaurus. The galaxy lies about 60 million light years away from Earth, which means, given its apparent dimensions, that NGC 5483 is approximately 60,000 light years across. It was discovered by John Herschel on March 15, 1836.

NGC 5483 has a small bulge and a small bar. From the ends of the bar emerge two well defined spiral arms in a grand design pattern. The arms have initially some knots but their outer parts are smoother. They fade after completing about half a revolution, when they became wide and diffuse. The galaxy has a faint outer arm to the north. There are also visible spiral arcs, which do not appear to be branched of the principal arms, and dust lanes. The galaxy has a large complex HII region that is about 4 arcseconds across. The star formation rate of the galaxy is estimated to be about 3.1 M_{☉} per year. In the centre of the galaxy lies a supermassive black hole, whose mass is estimated to be 10^{6.79 ± 0.38} (2.6 - 15 millions) M_{☉}, based on the pitch angle of the spiral arms.

One supernova has been detected in NGC 5483, PSNJ14102342-4318437. It was discovered on 15 December 2015 by MASTER at an apparent magnitude of 14.4. It was classified spectrographically as a type Ib supernova.

NGC 5483 doesn't belong to a galaxy group, but it is located in a galaxy cloud which also includes the galaxies IC 4362, IC 4386, IC 4402, and IC 4441.
