= NGC 888 =

Elliptical galaxy in the constellation Horologium

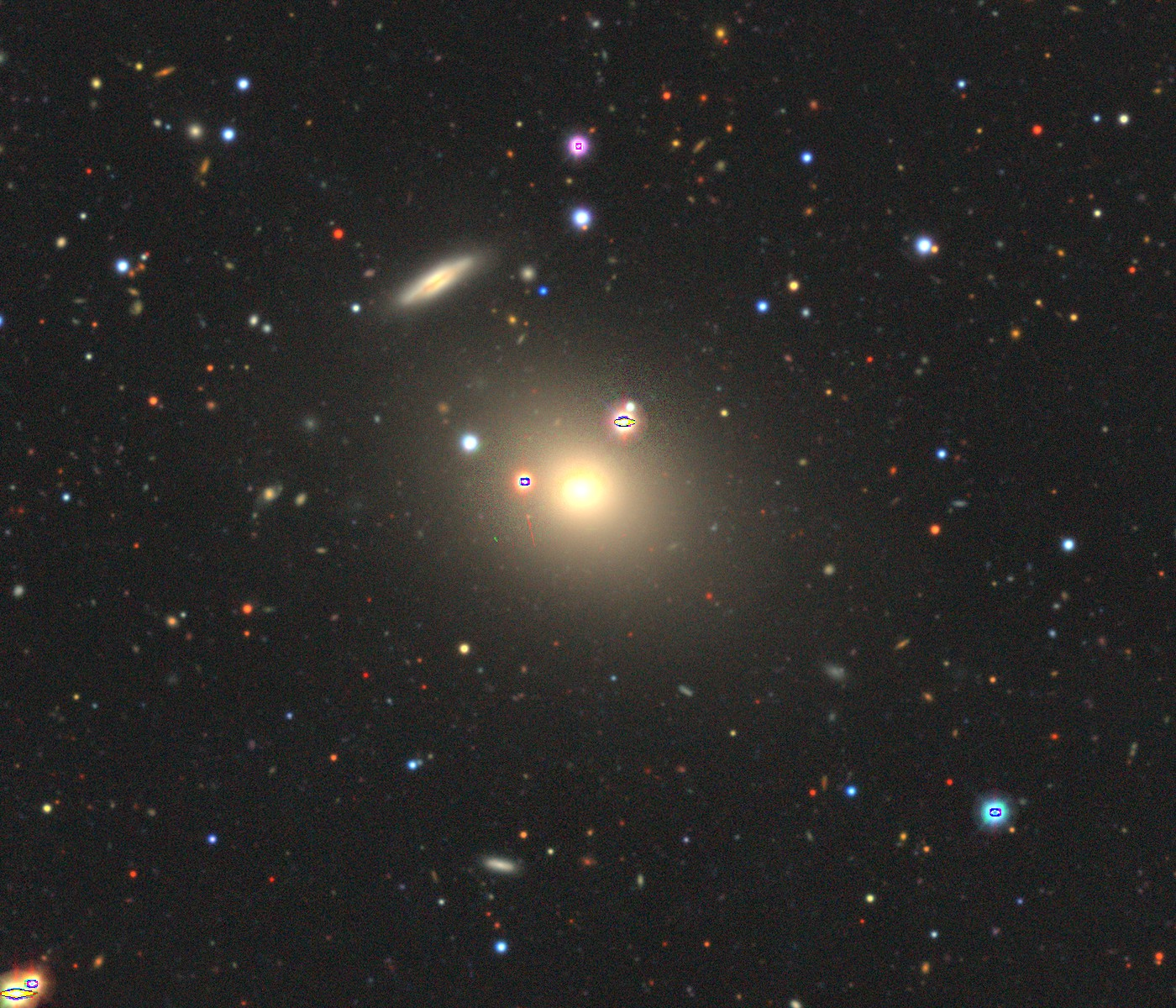
- NGC 888 imaged by Legacy Surveys

Observation data (J2000 epoch)
- Constellation: Horologium
- Right ascension: 02h 17m 27.1s
- Declination: −59° 51′ 40″
- Redshift: 0.029190±0.000133
- Heliocentric radial velocity: 8,751±40 km/s
- Galactocentric velocity: 8662±40 km/s
- Distance: 416.7 ± 29.2 Mly (127.76 ± 8.96 Mpc)
- Apparent magnitude (V): 13.0
- Apparent magnitude (B): 14.0
- Surface brightness: 12.52

Characteristics
- Type: E1? pec · E/S0? E
- Apparent size (V): 0.8′ × 0.8′
- Notable features: Flat-spectrum radio source

Other designations
- PGC 8743; ESO 115-2; AM 0215-600

NGC 888 is a large and relatively distant elliptical galaxy in the constellation Horologium. Its velocity relative to the cosmic microwave background is 8662±40 km/s, corresponding to a Hubble distance of 127.8±9.0 Mpc. It was discovered by British astronomer John Herschel in 1834.

== Characteristics ==
A redshift-independent distance measurement gives 136.0 Mpc, which is consistent within uncertainties with the Hubble distance.

NGC 888 is classified as a flat-spectrum radio galaxy.

== Galaxy pair ==
NGC 888 and ESO 115-003 form a galaxy pair. The Hubble distance of ESO 115-003 is 134.65±9.45 Mpc. Considering the uncertainties in the distances, it is possible that the two galaxies form a physical pair.

== Supernova ==
One supernova has been observed in NGC 888:

- SN 2016frs (Type Ia, mag. 16.1) was discovered by MASTER on 23 August 2016.
