= NGC 5516 =

Galaxy in the constellation Centaurus

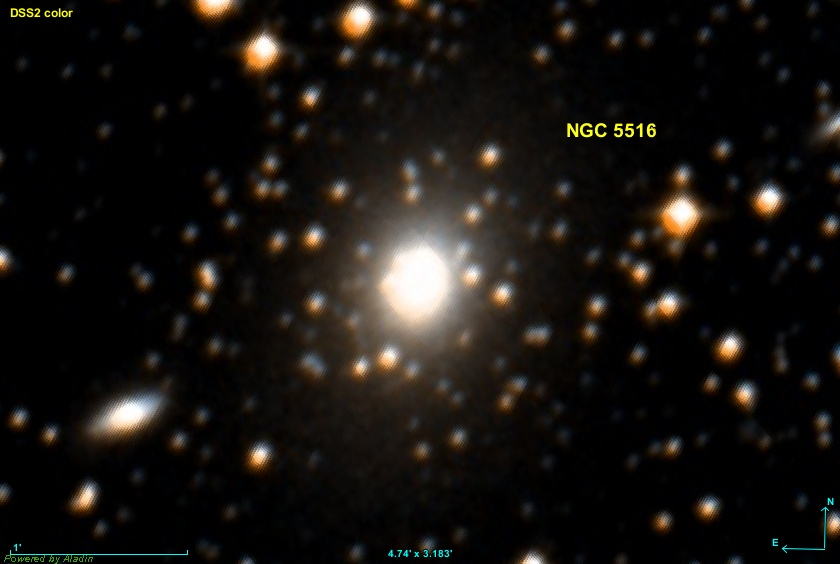
- NGC 5516 imaged by SDSS

Observation data (J2000 epoch)
- Constellation: Centaurus
- Right ascension: 14^{h} 15^{m} 54.7000^{s}
- Declination: −48° 06′ 53.257″
- Redshift: 0.013753±0.0000670
- Heliocentric radial velocity: 4,123±20 km/s
- Distance: 226.68 ± 13.74 Mly (69.500 ± 4.212 Mpc)
- Group or cluster: LDC 1050
- Apparent magnitude (V): 13.00

Characteristics
- Type: SA0^{-(s)}
- Size: ~232,300 ly (71.21 kpc) (estimated)
- Apparent size (V): 1.8′ × 1.2′

Other designations
- ESO 221- G 034, 2MASX J14155467-4806535, PGC 50960

NGC 5516 is a lenticular galaxy in the constellation of Centaurus. Its velocity with respect to the cosmic microwave background is 4,328±25 km/s, which corresponds to a Hubble distance of 208.2 ± 14.6 Mly (63.83 ± 4.49 Mpc). However, three non-redshift measurements give a farther mean distance of 226.68 ± 13.74 Mly (69.500 ± 4.212 Mpc). It was discovered by British astronomer John Herschel on 1 July 1834.

NGC 5516 has a possible active galactic nucleus, i.e. it has a compact region at the center of a galaxy that emits a significant amount of energy across the electromagnetic spectrum, with characteristics indicating that this luminosity is not produced by the stars.

== LDC 1050 Group ==
NGC 5516 is a member of a group of galaxies known as LDC 1050. This group contains six galaxies, including ESO 221-33, ESO 271-26, ESO 221-37, 6dFGS gJ141604.6-480738, and 2MASX J14143086-4826542.

== Supernovae ==
Two supernovae have been observed in NGC 5516:

- AT 2017kdz (also known as MASTER OT J141551.21-480802.6) (Type Ia, mag. 16.4) was discovered by MASTER robotic Net on 9 April 2017.
- SN 2026dez (Type Ia, mag. 18.642) was discovered by ATLAS on 14 February 2026. This supernova has a significant projected separation of 110 kly (34 kpc) from NGC 5516.

== See also ==
- List of NGC objects (5001–6000)
