= Lidiya Tseraskaya =

Soviet astronomer

Lidiya Petrovna Tseraskaya
- Лидия Петровна Цераская
- Born: Lidiya Petrovna Shelekhova; June 22, 1855; Astrakhan, Russia
- Died: December 24, 1931 (aged 76)
- Known for: Discovery of variable stars
- Spouse: Vitold Tserasky
- Scientific career
- Fields: Astronomy
- Institutions: Moscow Observatory

Lidiya Petrovna Tseraskaya née Shelekhova (Russian: Лидия Петровна Цераская; 22 June 1855 – 24 December 1931) was a Russian astronomer.

Tseraskaya was born in Astrakhan, and graduated from the Teacher's Institute in Petersberg. She worked at the Moscow Observatory, where she discovered 219 variable stars; among them RV Tauri in 1905, which she recognized as a new type of variable star. The Venusian crater Tseraskaya was named after her. Her academic papers were published under her husband's name, "W. Ceraski".

Tseraskaya was married to Vitold Tserasky (1849–1925), also known as Vitol'd Karlovic Tseraskiy or Witold Ceraski, who was Professor of Astronomy as Moscow University and director at the Moscow Observatory (105), after whom asteroid 807 Ceraskia and lunar crater Tseraskiy were named.
