= Zeldovich pancake =

Gas condensation following the Big Bang

A Zeldovich pancake is a theoretical condensation of gas out of a primordial density fluctuation following the Big Bang. In 1970, Yakov B. Zeldovich showed that for an ellipsoid of gas on a supergalactic scale, an approximation can be used that will model the collapse as occurring most rapidly along the shortest axis, resulting in a pancake form. This approximation assumes that the ellipsoid of gas is sufficiently large that the effect of pressure is negligible and only gravitational attraction needs to be considered. That is, the gas will collapse without being significantly perturbed by outward pressure. This assumption is especially valid if the collapse occurs before the recombination era that resulted in the formation of hydrogen atoms.

In 1989, Zeldovich and S. F. Shandarin showed that initial overlapping density fluctuations of random Gaussian fields would result in "dense pancakes, filaments, and compact clumps of matter". This model became known as a top-down model of galactic formation, with the supergalactic condensation fragmenting into protogalaxies. The formation of plane concentrations would compress the gas through shock waves generated during the collapse, increasing the temperature.

At a higher level, the collapse of larger structures according to the Zeldovich approximation is known as second-generation pancakes or superpancakes. At still higher levels there is a transition to a hierarchical clustering model in which a hierarchy of collapsing structures exist. The Truncated Zeldovich Approximation allowed the method to be applied to these hierarchical, or bottom-up models of cosmological structure. This approach truncates the power law fluctuation spectrum at large values of k before applying the Zeldovich Approximation. Generalizations of the Zel'dovich Approximation have also been shown to apply in the case of a non-zero cosmological constant.

The first example of a Zeldovich pancake may have been identified in 1991 using the Very Large Array in New Mexico.

== See also ==
- Baryon acoustic oscillations – Fluctuations in the density of the normal matter of the universe
- Galactic orientation
- Lyman-alpha blob – Astronomical object type
