= Denis Denisenko =

Russian astronomer

- Денис Денисенко
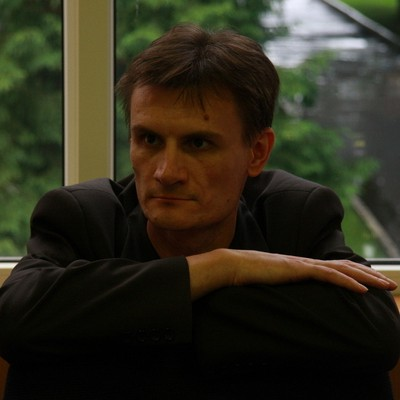
- Denisenko in 2012
- Born: January 16, 1971 (age 55); Moscow, USSR
- Citizenship: Russian Federation
- Education: Moscow Institute of Physics and Technology
- Known for: Discovery of supernovae, cataclysmic variables, gamma-ray bursts studies, asteroidal occultations
- Scientific career
- Fields: Astronomy, Astrophysics
- Workplaces: Sternberg Astronomical Institute
- Patrons: Vladimir Lipunov

Denis Denisenko (born January 16, 1971) is a Russian astronomer of the late 20th – early 21st century, discoverer of 10 supernovae, more than 150 variable stars, an asteroid, and a comet.

== Biography ==
Born in 1971 in Moscow, Denisenko graduated from Moscow Institute of Physics and Technology (MIPT or Phystech) in 1993 with a Master of Science in Astrophysics and a Diploma: Spectral Properties of Gamma-Ray Bursts Observed by PHEBUS Instrument of the Granat observatory. In 1991, he joined the High Energy Astrophysics Department of the Russian Space Research Institute (IKI) where he worked until April 2012. He was a visiting observer at the TUBITAK National Observatory (TUG) between 2002 and 2007. Since May 2012 he works at the Space Monitoring Laboratory of Sternberg Astronomical Institute of Moscow State University (SAI MSU). He is the author of more than 30 scientific articles, 250 astronomical telegrams and the presenter of talks at several international conferences.

He has been an amateur astronomer since 1977, a member of the Moscow Astronomy Club since 2002 and the head of a working group on asteroidal occultations. He participated in Astrofests 2001–2006 and was a speaker at Astrofest 2005, 2006 and 2013. He is an active enthusiast of professional-amateur collaboration in astronomy and long-time contributor to IOTAoccultations, Planoccult, meteorobs, comets-ml, MPML, SeeSat, AAVSO-HEN, AAVSO-DIS, vsnet-alert, vsnet-outburst, cvnet-discussion mailing lists. He is the owner and moderator of five Russian astronomy mailing lists (komety, pokrytie, rusmeteors, moscow-astro, varstars) and author of a few popular articles in Zemlya i Vselennaya (Earth and Universe) magazine. He was mentioned in Sky and Telescope twice and gave interviews on Russian News Service, Radio Liberty, Gazeta.ru newspaper, and the BBC Russian Service in 2007.

== Major discoveries ==
- Deep Eclipses in the Cataclysmic Variable 1RXS J020929.0+283243 (2005) – the binary system with 4.5^{m} eclipse amplitude.
- Optical Afterglow Candidate of GRB 920925C (2007) – the "prehistoric" Gamma ray burst with the optical afterglow found on the Palomar plate.
- NSV 1485 Correct Identification and Period Determination (2007)
- V713 Cep Eclipses and Period Measurement (2007)
- Supernova 2011 Hz
- Supernova 2011ip
- MASTER OT J211258.65+242145.4 (2012) – WZ Sge-type cataclysmic variable with 7 rebrightenings.
- MASTER OT J042609.34+354144.8 (2012) – the first dwarf nova in the hierarchical system with a common proper motion companion.
- Supernovae 2013hi, 2013hm, 2013ho, 2014af, 2014am
- Potentially Hazardous Asteroid 2014 UR_{116}
- Comet C/2015 K1 (MASTER)

== Other achievements ==
- Variable stars discoveries
- Prediction of the first stellar occultation by Trans-neptunian Objects (2004)
- Predicted the 12 Dec. 2023 occultation of Betelgeuse by (319) Leona (2004)
- Discovery of Minor Planet 2005 UN_{1}
- Occultation of 2UCAC 31525121 by (130) Elektra – the first successful observation of an asteroidal occultation from Turkey (2007)
- Correctly identified what was thought to be asteroid 2007 VN_{84} as the Rosetta probe
- Listed at Marquis Who's Who in Science and Engineering 10th Anniversary Edition 2008–2009
- Occultation of TYC 5161-00925-1 by (2) Pallas (2011) – the first successful observation of a kind from Moscow
- Prediction of cometary nature of the Near-Earth asteroid 2016 BA_{14}

== Literary works (in Russian) ==
- Hide away – Den is comin'! (1997) – book of ironic parodies on Russian ironist Andrey Knyshev.
- Was N.A. Morozov right, or Dating the Denderah Zodiacs (1992)
