= SW Andromedae =

Star in the constellation Andromeda

Observation data Epoch J2000 Equinox ICRS
- Constellation: Andromeda
- Right ascension: 00^{h} 23^{m} 43.08963^{s}
- Declination: +29° 24′ 03.6265″
- Apparent magnitude (V): 9.14 to 10.09

Characteristics
- Evolutionary stage: horizontal branch
- Spectral type: A7III
- Apparent magnitude (U): 10.287±0.20 (Note: Since SW Andromedae is a variable star these magnitudes are means sampled over the light curve.)
- Apparent magnitude (B): 10.097±0.006
- Apparent magnitude (V): 9.692±0.006
- Apparent magnitude (R_{c}): 9.433±0.020
- Apparent magnitude (I_{c}): 9.169±0.008
- Apparent magnitude (J): 8.757±0.020
- Apparent magnitude (H): 8.590±0.013
- Apparent magnitude (K_{s}): 8.511±0.009
- Variable type: RRab Lyrae

Astrometry
Proper motion (μ)	RA: −6.638(29) mas/yr Dec.: −18.906(26) mas/yr
Parallax (π)	1.9615±0.0284 mas
Distance	1,660 ± 20 ly (510 ± 7 pc)
Absolute magnitude (M_{V})	0.710

Details
Mass	0.26±0.04 M_{☉}
Radius	4.51–5.05 R_{☉}
Luminosity	39.8±4 L_{☉}
Temperature	6644 K

Other designations
- SW And, BD+28 54, HIP 1878, TYC 1737-1702-1, 2MASS J00234308+2924036

Database references
SIMBAD	data

SW Andromedae is a variable star in the constellation of Andromeda. It is classified as an RR Lyrae star, and varies from an apparent magnitude of 10.09 at minimum brightness to a magnitude of 9.14 at maximum brightness with a period of 0.44226 days. It exhibits the Blazhko effect, and its period is decreasing.

The discovery of this star by Annie Jump Cannon was announced in 1907. 461 photographic plates, spanning the time interval from November 14, 1889 through November 16, 1906 were examined, and an initial period of 0.49932 days was derived. SW Andromedae was given its variable star designation in 1907.

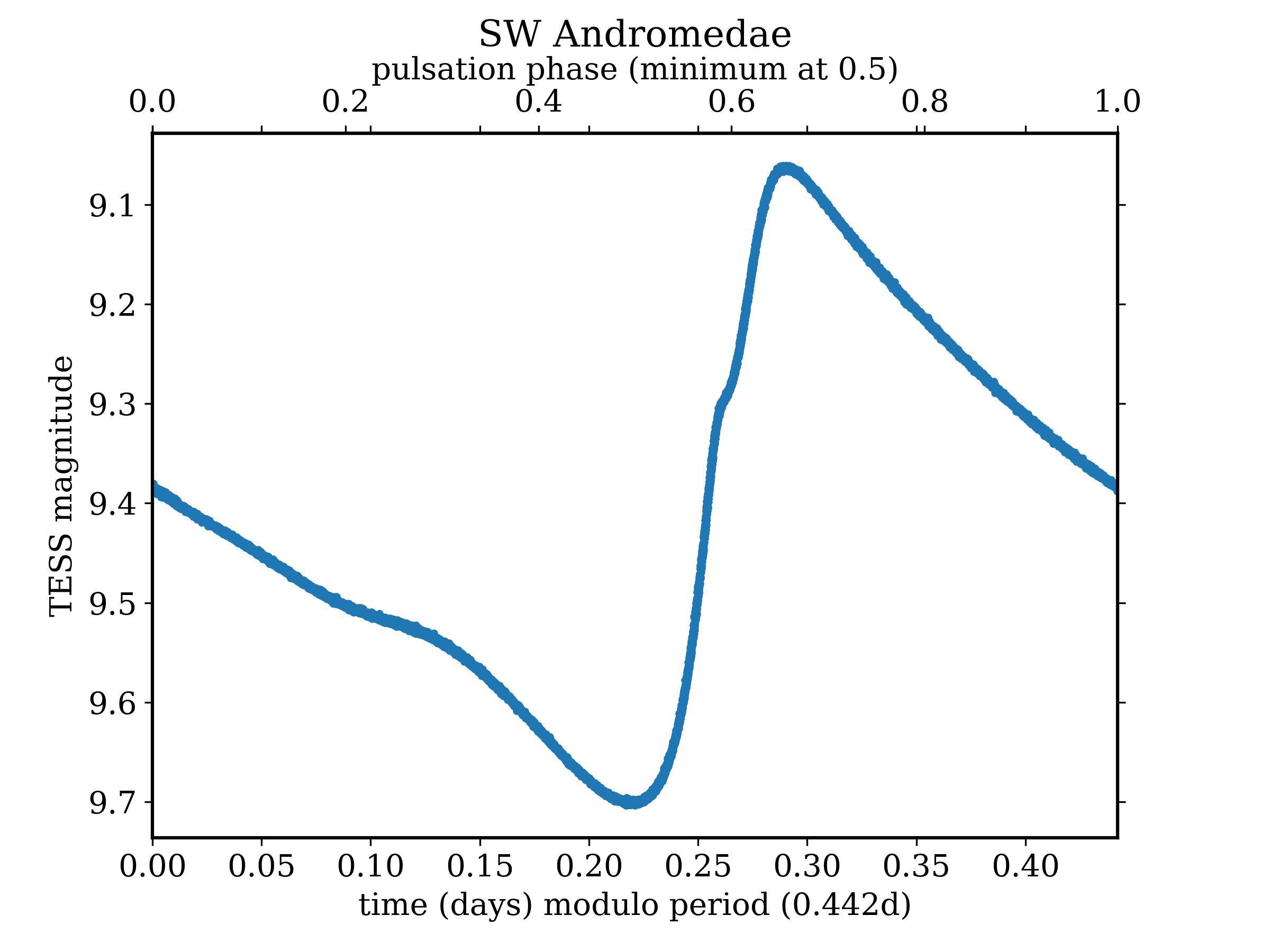
Phase-folded light curve of the RR Lyrae variable SW Andromedae recorded by NASA's Transiting Exoplanet Survey Satellite (TESS)

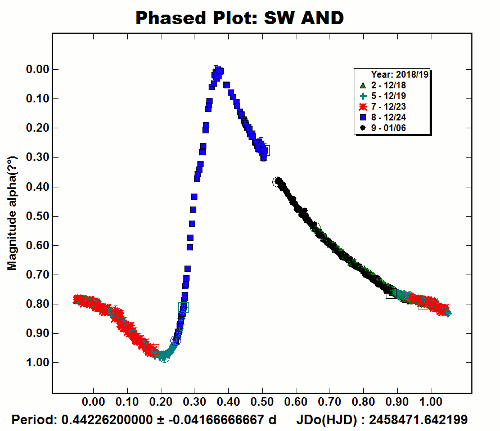
Light curve of SW AND taken through a J/C V band filter
