= Zeldovich–Liñán–Dold model =

In combustion, Zeldovich–Liñán–Dold model or ZLD model or ZLD mechanism is a two-step reaction model for the combustion processes, named after Yakov Borisovich Zeldovich, Amable Liñán and John W. Dold. The model includes a chain-branching and a chain-breaking (or radical recombination) reaction. The model was first introduced by Zeldovich in 1948, later analysed by Liñán using activation energy asymptotics in 1971 and later refined by John W. Dold in the 2000s. The ZLD mechanism reads as

$$\begin{align}
\rm{Branching\, (I):} & \quad \rm{F} + \rm{Z} \rightarrow 2\rm{Z} \\
\rm{Recombination\, (II):} & \quad \rm{Z} + \rm{M} \rightarrow \rm{P} +\rm{M} +\rm{Heat}
\end{align}$$

where $\rm{F}$ is the fuel, $\rm{Z}$ is an intermediate radical, $\rm{M}$ is the third body and $\rm{P}$ is the product. This mechanism exhibits a linear or first-order recombination. The model originally studied before Dold's refinement pertains to a quadratic or second-order recombination and is referred to as Zeldovich–Liñán model. The ZL mechanism reads as

$$\begin{align}
\rm{Branching\, (I):} & \quad \rm{F} + \rm{Z} \rightarrow 2\rm{Z} \\
\rm{Recombination\, (II):} & \quad\rm{Z} + \rm{Z} + \rm{M} \rightarrow 2\rm{P} +\rm{M} +\rm{Heat}.
\end{align}$$

In both models, the first reaction is the chain-branching reaction (it produces two radicals by consuming one radical), which is considered to be auto-catalytic (consumes no heat and releases no heat), with very large activation energy and the second reaction is the chain-breaking (or radical-recombination) reaction (it consumes radicals), where all of the heat in the combustion is released, with almost negligible activation energy. Therefore, the rate constants are written as

$$k_{\rm{I}} = A_{\rm{I}} e^{-E_{\rm I}/RT}, \quad k_{\rm II} = A_{\rm II}$$

where $A_{\rm I}$ and $A_{\rm II}$ are the pre-exponential factors, $E_{\rm I}$ is the activation energy for chain-branching reaction which is much larger than the thermal energy and $T$ is the temperature.

== Crossover temperature ==
There are two fundamental aspects that differentiate Zeldovich–Liñán–Dold (ZLD) model from the Zeldovich–Liñán (ZL) model. First of all, the so-called cold-boundary difficulty in premixed flames does not occur in the ZLD model and secondly the so-called crossover temperature exist in the ZLD, but not in the ZL model.

For simplicity, consider a spatially homogeneous system, then the concentration $C_{\mathrm{Z}}(t)$ of the radical in the ZLD model evolves according to

$$\frac{dC_{\mathrm{Z}}}{dt} =  C_{\mathrm{Z}}\left(A_{\mathrm{I}}C_{\mathrm{F}}e^{-E_{\mathrm{I}}/RT} - A_{\mathrm{II}}\right).$$

From this equation the radical concentration will grow in time if the righthand side term is positive. More precisely, the initial equilibrium state $C_{\mathrm{Z}}(0)=0$ is unstable if the right-side term is positive. If $C_{\mathrm{F}}(0)=C_{\mathrm{F},0}$ denotes the initial fuel concentration, a crossover temperature $T^*$ at which the branching and recombination rates are equal can be defined, i.e.,

$$e^{E_{\mathrm{I}}/RT^*} =  \frac{A_{\mathrm{I}}}{A_{\mathrm{II}}} C_{\mathrm{F},0}.$$

When $T>T^*$, branching dominates over recombination and therefore the radial concentration will grow in time, whereas if $T<T^*$, recombination dominates over branching and therefore the radial concentration will disappear in time.

In a more general setup, where the system is non-homogeneous, evaluation of crossover temperature is complicated because of the presence of convective and diffusive transport.

In the ZL model, one would have obtained $e^{E_{\mathrm{I}}/RT^*} = (A_{\mathrm{I}}/A_{\mathrm{II}}) C_{\mathrm{F},0} C_{\mathrm{Z}}(0)$, but since $C_{\mathrm{Z}}(0)$ is zero or vanishingly small in the perturbed state, there is no crossover temperature.

== Three regimes ==
In his analysis, Liñán showed that there exists three types of regimes, namely, slow recombination regime, intermediate recombination regime and fast recombination regime. These regimes exist in both aforementioned models.

Let us consider a premixed flame in the ZLD model. Based on the thermal diffusivity $D_T$ and the flame burning speed $S_L$, one can define the flame thickness (or the thermal thickness) as $\delta_L=D_T/S_L$. Since the activation energy of the branching is much greater than thermal energy, the characteristic thickness $\delta_B$ of the branching layer will be $\delta_B/\delta_L \sim O(1/\beta)$, where $\beta$ is the Zeldovich number based on $E_{\mathrm{I}}$. The recombination reaction does not have the activation energy and its thickness $\delta_R$ will characterised by its Damköhler number $Da_{\mathrm{II}}=(D_T/S_L^2)/(W_{\mathrm{Z}} A_{\mathrm{II}}^{-1})$, where $W_{\mathrm{Z}}$ is the molecular weight of the intermediate species. Specifically, from a diffusive-reactive balance, we obtain $\delta_R/\delta_L \sim O(Da_{\mathrm{II}}^{-1/2})$ (in the ZL model, this would have been $\delta_R/\delta_L \sim O(Da_{\mathrm{II}}^{-1/3})$).

By comparing the thicknesses of the different layers, the three regimes are classified:

- Slow Recombination Regime (SRR): $Da_{\mathrm{II}} = O(1)$ and $O(\delta_B)\ll O(\delta_R)=O(\delta_L).$
- Intermediate Recombination Regime (IRR): $Da_{\mathrm{II}} = O(\beta)$ and $O(\delta_B)\ll O(\delta_R)\ll O(\delta_L).$
- Fast Recombination Regime (FRR): $Da_{\mathrm{II}} = O(\beta^2)$ and $O(\delta_B)= O(\delta_R)\ll O(\delta_L).$

The fast recombination represents situations near the flammability limits when the recombination layer becomes comparable to the branching layer. The criticality is achieved when the branching is unable to cope with the recombination. Such criticality exists in the ZLD model. Su-Ryong Lee and Jong S. Kim showed that as $\Delta \equiv Da_{\mathrm{II}}/\beta^2$ becomes large, the critical condition is reached,

$$r=e\left(1+ \frac{0.4162}{\sqrt{\Delta}}\right)$$

where

$$r = \frac{Da_{\mathrm{I}}}{\beta Da_{\mathrm{II}}} e^{-\beta(1+q)/q}, \quad Da_{\mathrm{I}} = \frac{D_T/S_L^2}{(A_\mathrm{I}Y_{\mathrm{F},0}/W_{\mathrm{F}})^{-1}}.$$

Here $q$ is the heat release parameter, $Y_{\mathrm{F},0}$ is the unburnt fuel mass fraction and $W_{\mathrm{F}}$ is the molecular weight of the fuel.

== See also ==
- Zel'dovich mechanism
- Peters four-step chemistry
