= Vladimir Lipunov =

Russian astronomer

- Владимир Липунов
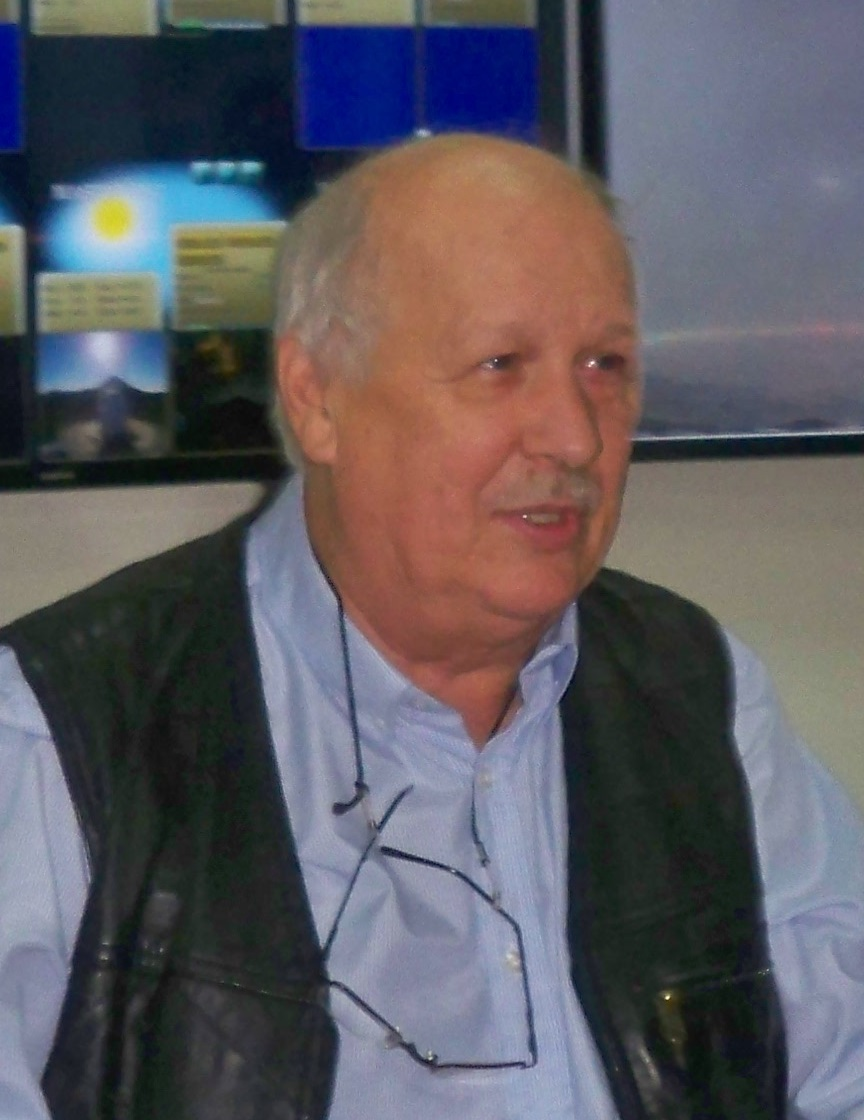
- Lipunov in 2017
- Born: Vladimir Mikhailovich Lipunov; 17 August 1952 (age 74); Raichikhinsk, Amur Oblast, USSR
- Citizenship: Russia
- Education: Moscow State University
- Known for: Master Global Robotic Telescopes Net
- Scientific career
- Fields: Astrophysics
- Workplaces: Moscow State University; Sternberg Astronomical Institute
- Academic advisors: Yakov Zeldovich

Vladimir Mikhailovich Lipunov (Russian: Владимир Михайлович Липунов; born August 17, 1952, in Raichikhinsk, Amur Oblast, RSFSR) is a Russian astrophysicist and sci-fi writer known for creating the Master Global Robotic Telescopes Net.

Lipunov is Professor of the Moscow State University, Doctor of Physical and Mathematical Sciences (1991), a member of the International Astronomical Union (1993) and the European Astronomical Society (1993). He is also a science fiction writer under the pseudonym Vladimir Khlumov (Russian: Владимир Хлумов) and a member of the Union of Russian Writers.

== Biography ==
In 1976, he graduated from Moscow State University and until 1979 worked in Kyiv at the Main Astronomical Observatory of the Academy of Sciences of the Ukrainian SSR.

In 1982, he finished his post-graduate course of the Moscow State University under the supervision of the academician Yakov Borisovich Zel'dovich and since 1981 to 1992 was Associated Professor in the Astronomical Department of the Faculty of Physics of Moscow State University and worked at the P.K. Shternberg State Astronomical Institute. Then he began to work as a Professor at the Chair of Astrophysics and Stellar Astronomy of the Moscow State University, where he lectures and conducts seminars up to the present.

== Achievements ==
In December 2014, Lipunov, with the help of the Master Global Robotic Telescopes Net, recovered a new Potentially hazardous object, according to the Russian news agencies, larger than the already known asteroid 99942 Apophis. The new asteroid was named 2014 UR116.

He is the author of more than 700 scientific publications, including monograph "Astrophysics of Neutron Stars".

== As a science fiction writer ==
He is the author of the plays The Children of the Stars (1990), The Old Song (1996), The Night Watch (1996), and the novels The Leaves of Moscow Autumn (1996), The Old Virgin Mary (1997), The Lovely (1998), The Seagull Named Fedor (2000), Master of Smoke Rings (2000), Fatal letters (2002).

In April 1999, Lipunov organized a literary Internet magazine Russky Pereplet.

== Awards and honours ==
- Laureate of the All-Union Competition of the Society "Znanie" (1987)
- M.V. Lomonosov Prize of Moscow State University (2002)
- Honored Educator of the Higher School of the Russian Federation (2006)
