= Joule (crater) =

Crater on the Moon

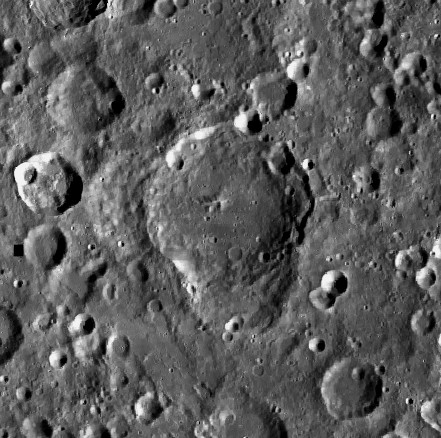
- LRO image
- Coordinates: 27.3°N 144.2°W
- Diameter: 96 km
- Depth: Unknown
- Colongitude: 145° at sunrise
- Formation: Imbrian or Nectarian
- Eponym: James Prescott Joule

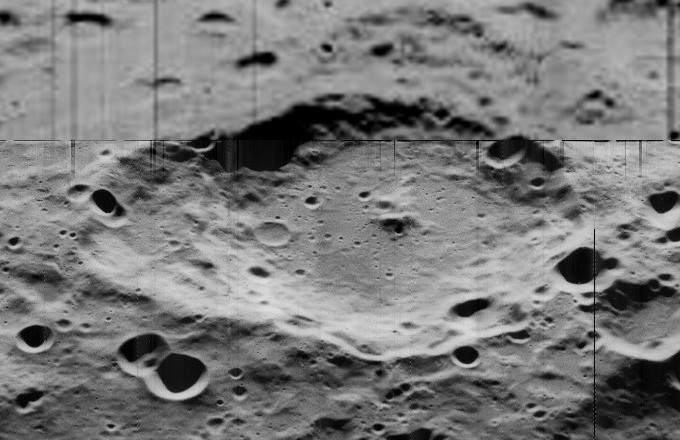
Mosaic of oblique Lunar Orbiter 5 images, facing west

Joule is a lunar impact crater that lies on the far side of the Moon. It is located to the north-northeast of a walled plain called Mach. To the northwest of Joule is the crater Blazhko.

This formation dates to the Imbrian or Nectarian period on the lunar geologic timescale. It is a worn and eroded crater. A pair of smaller craters lies along the northeastern rim, and a crater is intruding into the northwest rim. To the south is an outward projection that has the appearance of a crater partly overlain by Joule. The infrared spectrum of pure crystalline plagioclase has been identified on the south wall. The remainder of the rim and inner wall is somewhat irregular. The interior floor is more level than the terrain surrounding the crater, but is marked by some small craterlets. At the midpoint of the interior floor is a central peak.

Joule T is located less than a crater diameter to the west of Joule. A smaller crater named Wargo with a prominent ray system lies on the western edge of Joule T. These rays primarily project to the south of the crater, with the most prominent ray crossing the crater Harvey to the south. Only faint traces of this ray system actually cross into Joule, and are generally restricted to the western rim, inner sides and floor.

== Satellite craters ==
By convention these features are identified on lunar maps by placing the letter on the side of the crater midpoint that is closest to Joule.

Joule	Latitude	Longitude	Diameter
K	25.8° N	141.9° W	16 km
L	26.1° N	144.1° W	69 km
T	27.7° N	148.2° W	37 km
