= Blazhko (crater) =

Crater on the Moon

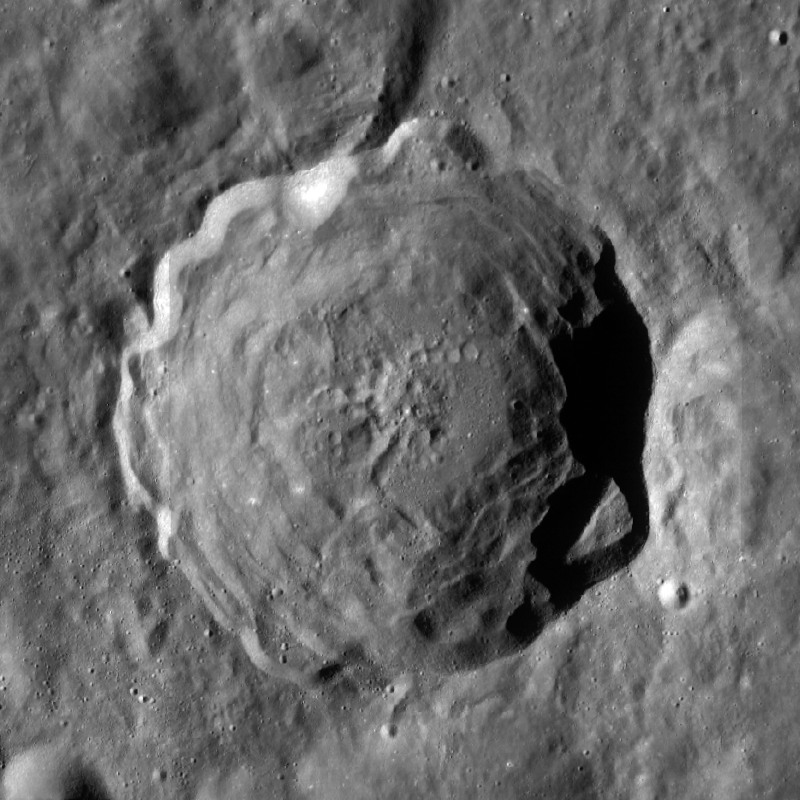
- LRO mosaic
- Coordinates: 31.6°N 148.0°W
- Diameter: 51.11 km (31.76 mi)
- Depth: Unknown
- Colongitude: 148° at sunrise
- Eponym: Sergei N. Blazhko

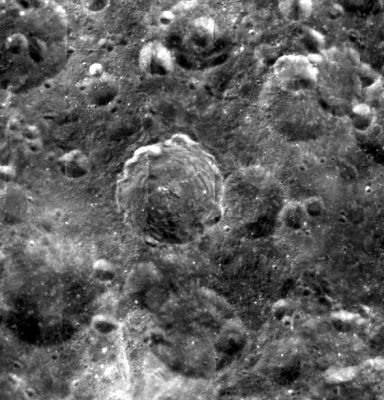
Clementine mosaic with Blazhko at center

Blazhko is a lunar impact crater that is located in the northern hemisphere on the far side of the Moon. It lies to the northwest of the crater Joule, and to the south of Gadomski. The fresh, bright crater Wargo is to the south, on the rim of Joule T.

This is a large fresh crater that has covered up some older impacts in the vicinity. The rim is generally circular, but with some irregularities. There is a small outward bulge in the rim to the east-southeast, and an inward bulge on the opposite face. There is also a slight outward bulge along the north rim. The satellite crater Blazhko F is attached to the exterior of the east rim. The inner wall along the northeast face is striated with terraces. The interior floor is relatively level.

This crater was named after Russian astronomer Sergey Blazhko (1870–1956). The designation was officially adopted by the International Astronomical Union in 1970.

== Satellite craters ==
By convention these features are identified on lunar maps by placing the letter on the side of the crater midpoint that is closest to Blazkho.

| Blazkho | Latitude | Longitude | Diameter |
|---|---|---|---|
| D | 33.0° N | 145.2° W | 34 km |
| F | 31.4° N | 146.7° W | 34 km |
| L | 29.3° N | 147.6° W | 44 km |
| R | 30.0° N | 149.8° W | 53 km |
