= Roman Juszkiewicz =

Polish astrophysicist

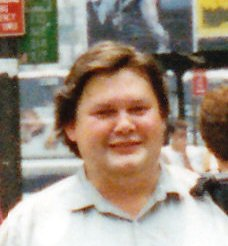
- Born: 9 August 1952; Warsaw
- Died: 28 January 2012 (aged 59)
- Citizenship: Poland
- Education: Moscow State University, University of Warsaw
- Known for: evolution of cosmological adiabatic perturbations in the weakly non-linear regime
- Scientific career
- Fields: Cosmology
- Workplaces: N. Copernicus Astronomical Center, Polish Academy of Sciences
- Doctoral advisor: Marek Demiański
- Other academic advisors: Yakov Borisovich Zel'dovich

Roman Juszkiewicz (9 August 1952 – 28 January 2012) was a Polish astrophysicist whose work concerned fundamental issues of cosmology.

Juszkiewicz was born in Warsaw. He studied at Moscow State University (a student of Yakov Borisovich Zel'dovich), where he graduated in 1976. In 1981 he obtained a PhD at the University of Warsaw. During 1984–1986 he visited Cambridge and Sussex universities, he spent 1986–87 at Berkeley, 1987–1991 at Princeton, and from 1989 was a member of the Princeton Institute for Advanced Study. He also worked at the Institut d'Astrophysique de Paris and the University of Geneva. Juszkiewicz held a professor position at N. Copernicus Astronomical Center of the Polish Academy of Sciences, the university of Zielona Góra and the Multicultural Jacek Kuroń High School in Warsaw. Juszkiewicz obtained his professorial title on 20 August 2003.

Juszkiewicz's scientific interests included the theory of gravitational instability, origins of the large-scale structure, microwave background radiation and Big Bang nucleosynthesis. He wrote nearly one hundred research papers, mostly in the area of cosmology. Calculations based on observed motions of pairs of galaxies, obtained in 2000 by Roman Juszkiewicz and the group led by him, aimed at estimating the amount of dark matter in the Universe, were confirmed by data from the South Pole's ACBAR detector.
