= Blazhko effect =

Variation in period and amplitude in RR Lyrae type variable stars

The Blazhko effect, also known as the Tseraskaya–Blazhko effect, and which is sometimes called long-period modulation, is a variation in period and amplitude in RR Lyrae type variable stars. Sergey Blazhko first reported its observation in 1907 in his follow-up study of the star RW Draconis that was previously discovered by Lidiya Tseraskaya.

The physics behind the Blazhko effect is currently still a matter of debate, with there being three primary hypotheses. In the first, referred to as the resonance model, the cause of the modulation is a non-linear resonance among either the fundamental or the first overtone pulsation mode of the star and a higher mode. The second, known as the magnetic model, assumes the variation to be caused by the magnetic field being inclined to the rotational axis, deforming the main radial mode. The magnetic model was ruled out in 2004 by high resolution spectro-polarimetric observations. The third model assumes that cycles in the convection cause the alternations and the modulations.

Observational evidence based on Kepler space telescope observations indicates much of the Blazhko effect's two-cycle light curve modulation is due to simple period-doubling. Many RR Lyrae stars have a variability period of approximately 12 hours and ground-based astronomers typically make nightly observations about 24 hours apart; thus period-doubling results in brightness maximums during nightly observations that are significantly different from the daytime maximum.
