= Sergey Blazhko =

Russian astronomer (1870–1956)

Sergey Nikolayevich Blazhko
- Серге́й Никола́евич Блажко́
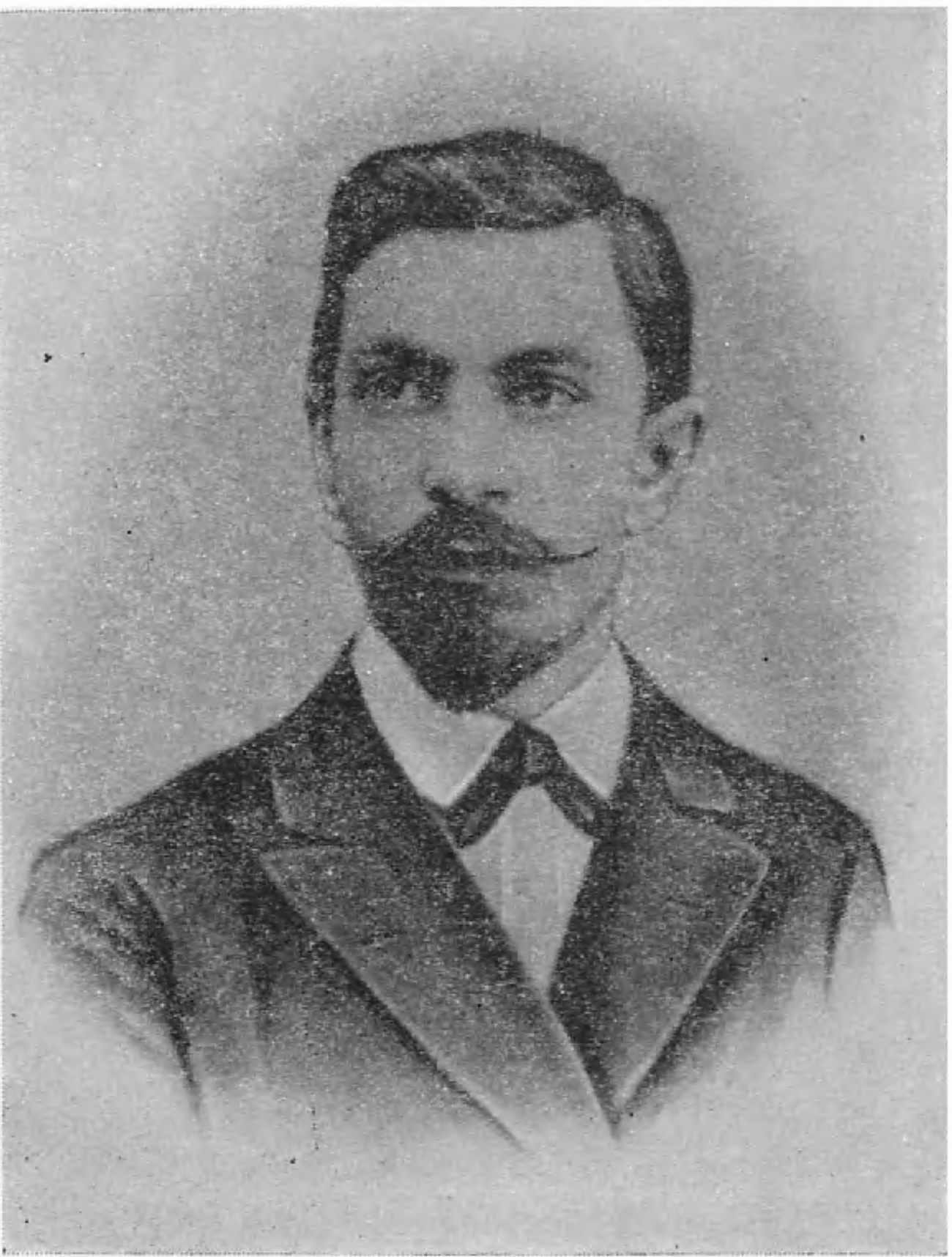
- Sergey Blazhko in 1905
- Born: November 17, 1870; Khotsimsk
- Died: February 11, 1956 (aged 85); Moscow, Soviet Union
- Education: Moscow State University
- Occupation: Astronomer
- Organization: Academy of Sciences of the Soviet Union (1929, corresponding member)
- Known for: Blazhko crater, planet No. 2445

Sergey Nikolayevich Blazhko (Russian: Серге́й Никола́евич Блажко́; November 17, 1870, Khotsimsk – February 11, 1956, Moscow) was a Russian and Soviet astronomer, a corresponding member of the Academy of Sciences of the Soviet Union (1929). He was a graduate of Moscow State University and held a number of positions there including head of the Moscow Observatory from 1920-1931. He discovered a secondary variation of the amplitude and period of some RR Lyrae stars and related pulsating variables, now known as the Blazhko effect.

== Awards and honours ==
- Laureate of the Stalin Prize, 2nd degree (1951)
- Orders of Lenin (1944, 1953)
- Orders of the Red Banner of Labour (1940, 1945)
- Medal "For Valiant Labour in the Great Patriotic War 1941–1945" (1946)

Crater on the Moon and asteroid No. 2445 are named after Blazhko.
