= C/2020 F5 (MASTER) =

Non-periodic comet

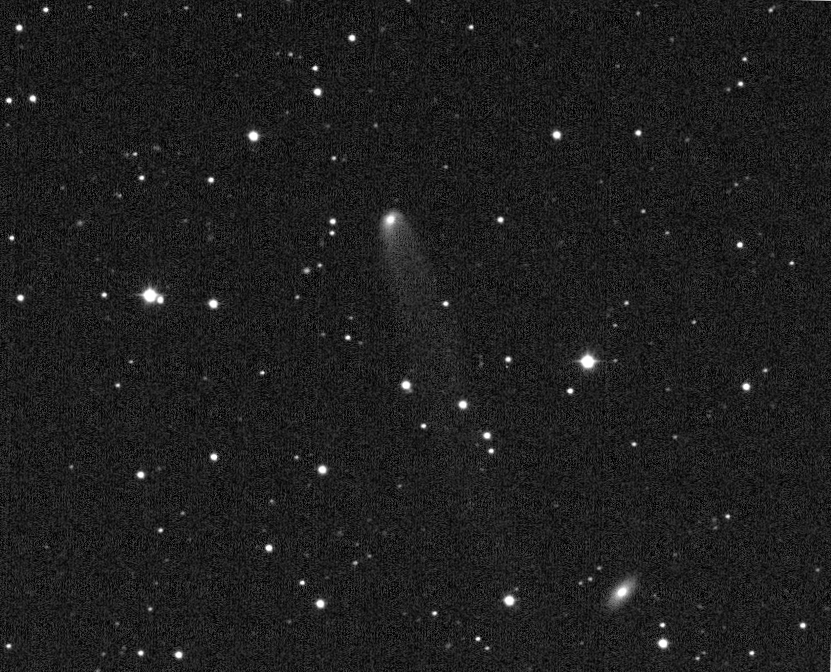
- Comet MASTER photographed from the Zwicky Transient Facility on 27 September 2021

Discovery
- Discovered by: MASTER
- Discovery date: 28 March 2020

Orbital characteristics
- Epoch: 27 March 2022 (JD 2459665.5)
- Observation arc: 1,663 days (4.55 years)
- Earliest precovery date: 16 March 2020
- Number of observations: 1,861
- Aphelion: ~1,760 AU
- Perihelion: 4.325 AU
- Semi-major axis: ~880 AU
- Eccentricity: 0.99509
- Orbital period: ~36,000 years (inbound); ~1,800 years (outbound)
- Inclination: 52.257°
- Longitude of ascending node: 350.53°
- Argument of periapsis: 310.99°
- Mean anomaly: 0.0139°
- Last perihelion: 23 March 2021
- T_{Jupiter}: 1.582
- Earth MOID: 3.515 AU
- Jupiter MOID: 0.162 AU

Physical characteristics
- Mean radius: 36.86 km (22.90 mi)
- Comet total magnitude (M1): 7.2
- Comet nuclear magnitude (M2): 9.7

C/2020 F5 (MASTER) is a non-periodic comet discovered on 28 March 2020, by the MASTER auto-detection system near San Juan, Argentina.

When first discovered there were dubious claims that it might be an interstellar object, but now it is known to have a weakly near-parabolic eccentricity of just 0.99509. Before planetary perturbations the comet had an orbital period of about 36,000 years.

== Orbit ==
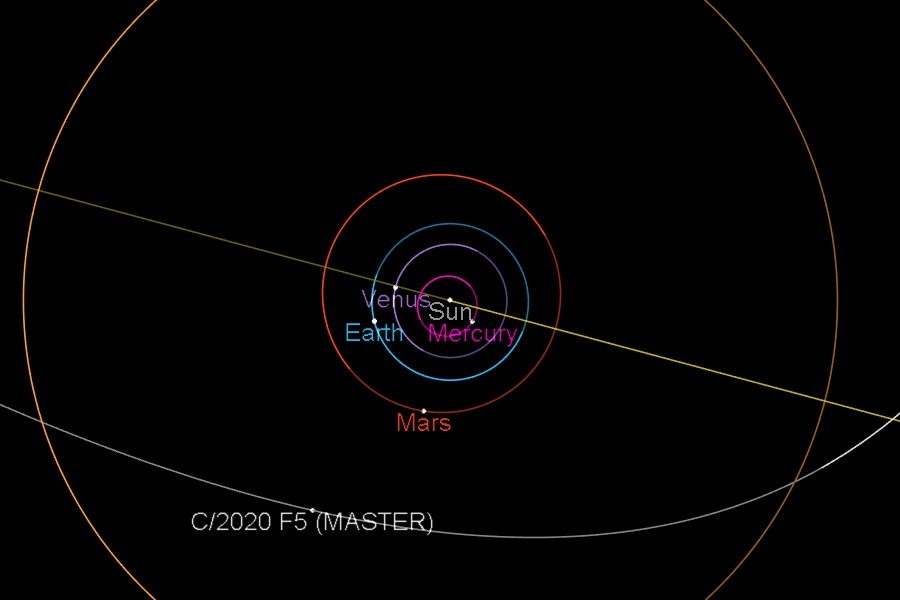
Orbit of C/2020 F5 (MASTER) on 20 April 2020
