= Zeldovich amplification =

Wave amplification in rotating objects

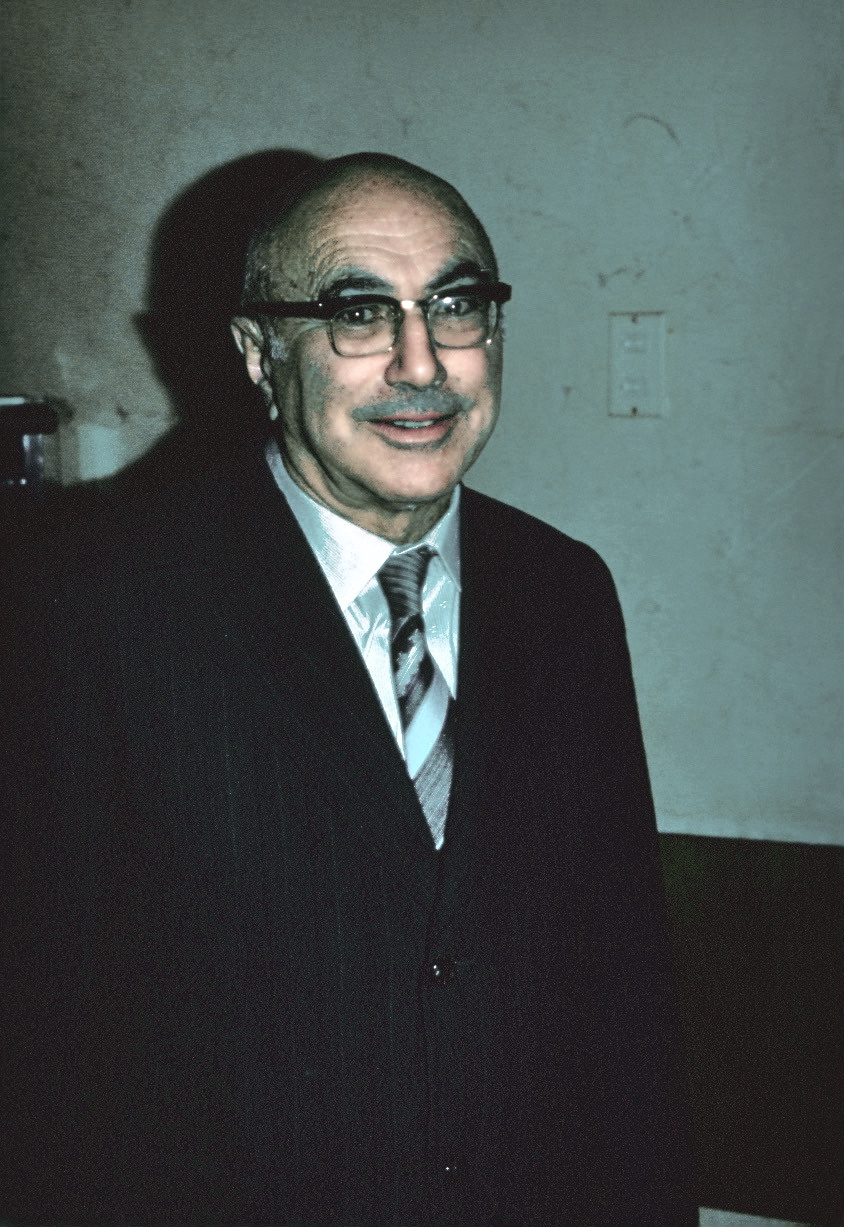
Zeldovich in 1980

In physics, the Zeldovich amplification, Zeldovich effect or Zeldovich radiation is a physical phenomenon in which waves, such as electromagnetic, acoustic, or gravitational waves, are amplified rather than absorbed when they interact with a rotating, absorbing object. Predicted by Soviet physicist Yakov Zeldovich in 1971, the effect occurs when the rotation speed of the object exceeds the angular frequency of the incident wave. The effect is considered a classical analogue to black hole superradiance and is closely related to the Penrose process. While theoretically established for decades, the effect was first experimentally verified with acoustic waves in 2020. Although a viable experimental mechanism for electromagnetic waves was proposed that same year, experimental verification in the electromagnetic spectrum was not achieved until 2024.

The core principle of the Zeldovich effect lies in the rotational Doppler shift. When a wave carrying orbital angular momentum strikes a rotating body, the frequency of the wave as seen by the rotating body is shifted. For an incident wave with an angular frequency $\omega$, an angular momentum number of $\omega$ and an interacting with a body rotating at an angular velocity of $\Omega$, the condition for amplification is:

$$\omega - m\Omega < 0$$

In this regime, the effective frequency of the wave in the rotating frame of reference becomes negative. From the perspective of the rotating object, the negative frequency causes the absorption coefficient to change sign. Instead of the object extracting energy from the wave, the wave extracts mechanical rotational energy from the object, resulting in an amplification of the reflected or transmitted wave.

== See also ==
- Analog models of gravity
- Hawking radiation
- Superradiance
- Unruh effect
