= C/2015 G2 (MASTER) =

Hyperbolic comet

Discovery
- Discovered by: MASTER
- Discovery date: 7 April 2015

Orbital characteristics
- Epoch: 21 April 2015 (JD 2457133.5)
- Observation arc: 54 days
- Number of observations: 230
- Perihelion: 0.779879 AU
- Eccentricity: 1.00045 (1950); 1.00085 (2015); 1.00078 (2050)
- Inclination: 147.5613°
- Last perihelion: 23 May 2015
- Next perihelion: Ejection

Physical characteristics
- Dimensions: 1.8–2.2 km (1.1–1.4 mi)
- Mean diameter: 2.0 km (1.2 mi)
- Comet total magnitude (M1): 11.6±1.0
- Comet nuclear magnitude (M2): 14.5±0.9
- Apparent magnitude: 6.0 (2015 apparition)

C/2015 G2 (MASTER) is a comet discovered April 7, 2015 by MASTER, the Mobile Astronomical System of the Telescope-Robots at the South African Astronomical Observatory (SAAO). It was the first comet discovered from South Africa in 35 years.

Discovery was confirmed April 10, 2015 by the Minor Planet Center. It was at magnitude 10.7 at discovery and by mid-May it had reached magnitude 6.0.
