= Marina Romanova =

Russian-American computational astrophysicist

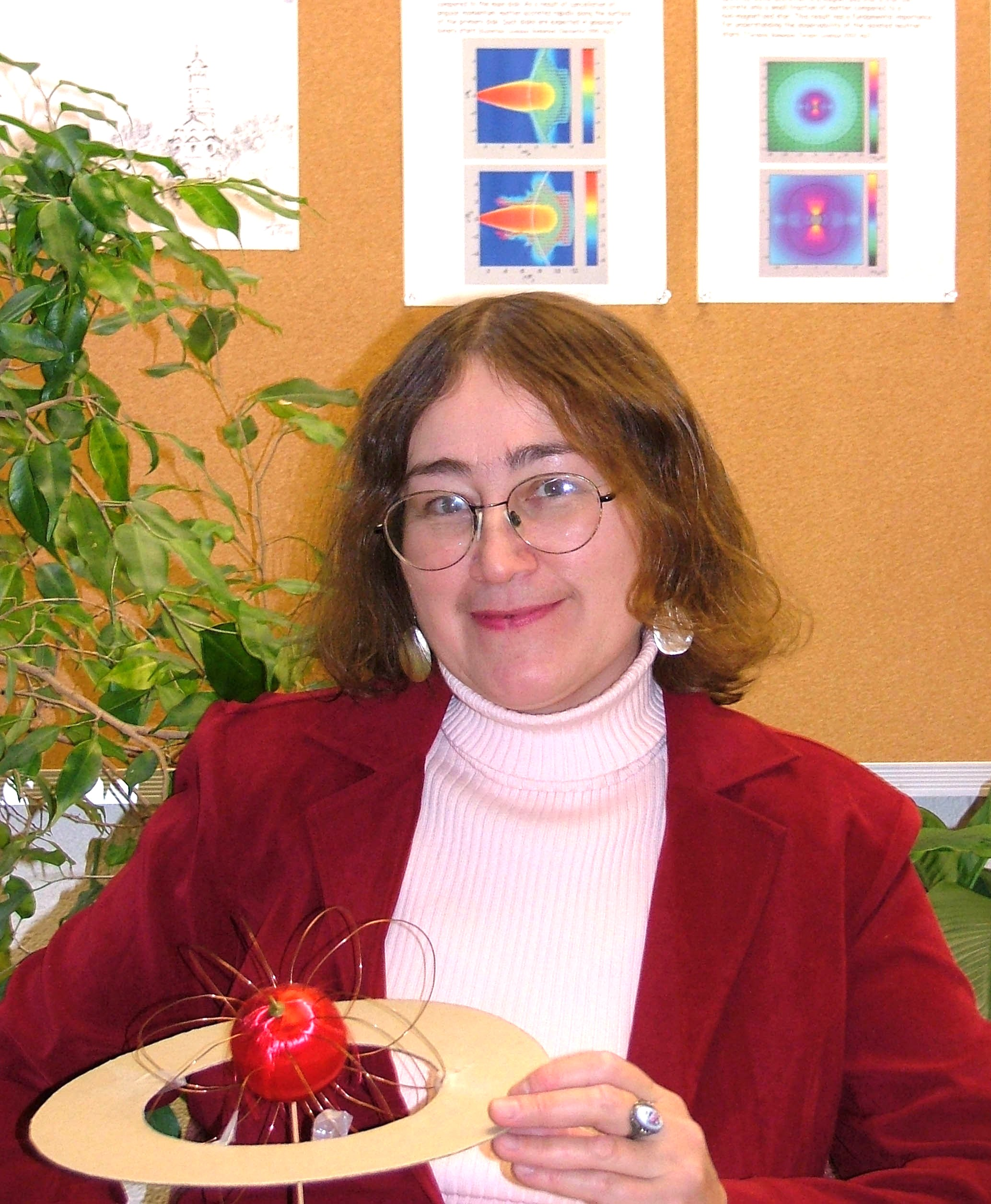
- Education: Moscow State University
- Scientific career
- Fields: computational astrophysicics
- Workplaces: Russian Space Research Institute; Cornell University

Romanova is a Russian-American computational astrophysicist, known for her work simulating the magnetohydrodynamics of accretion disks, including their interactions with the stellar magnetic fields of T Tauri stars and other young magnetized stars, and the formation of magnetic towers along the rotation axis of the accretion disks of black holes. She works as a senior research associate in the Cornell Center for Astrophysics and Planetary Science, in the Department of Astronomy at Cornell University.

== Education and career ==
Romanova studied astronomy at Moscow State University, graduating in 1978. After continuing as a graduate student at Moscow State University, she became a researcher at the Russian Space Research Institute from 1981 to 1996, earning a Ph.D. in astrophysics and radioastronomy there in 1986 under the joint supervision of Yakov Zeldovich and Gennady S. Bisnovatyi-Kogan.

She came to Cornell University as a visiting scientist in 1996, and became a permanent researcher there in 1999.
