= 807 Ceraskia =

Elongated Eos asteroid

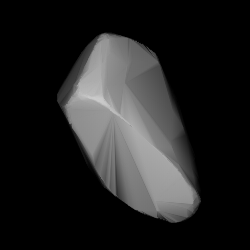
- Shape model of Ceraskia from its lightcurve

Discovery
- Discovered by: M. F. Wolf
- Discovery site: Heidelberg Obs.
- Discovery date: 18 April 1915

Designations
- Named after: Vitold Cerasky (1849–1925) (Belarusian–Soviet astronomer)
- Alternative designations: A915 HF · 1974 QB_{3} A909 BK · A917 QA; 1915 WY
- Minor planet category: main-belt · (outer); Eos

Orbital characteristics
- Epoch 31 May 2020 (JD 2459000.5)
- Uncertainty parameter 0
- Observation arc: 111.04 yr (40,559 d)
- Aphelion: 3.2127 AU
- Perihelion: 2.8199 AU
- Semi-major axis: 3.0163 AU
- Eccentricity: 0.0651
- Orbital period (sidereal): 5.24 yr (1,913 d)
- Mean anomaly: 91.475°
- Mean motion: 0° 11^{m} 17.16^{s} / day
- Inclination: 11.320°
- Longitude of ascending node: 132.20°
- Argument of perihelion: 337.21°

Physical characteristics
- Mean diameter: 21.241±0.270 km; 26.24±1.3 km; 30.38±0.56 km
- Synodic rotation period: 7.368±0.002 h
- Pole ecliptic latitude: (325.0°, 23.0°) (λ_{1}/β_{1}); (132.0°, 26.0°) (λ_{2}/β_{2})
- Geometric albedo: 0.121±0.005; 0.1532±0.016; 0.207±0.025
- Spectral type: Tholen = S; Cgx (MOVIS); B–V = 0.845±0.053; U–B = 0.447±0.033
- Absolute magnitude (H): 10.56; 10.6; 10.69

807 Ceraskia (prov. designation: A915 HF or 1915 WY) is an elongated Eos asteroid from the outer regions of the asteroid belt. It was discovered on 18 April 1915, by German astronomer Max Wolf at the Heidelberg-Königstuhl State Observatory in southwest Germany. The S-type asteroid has a rotation period of 7.4 hours and measures approximately 24 kilometers (15 miles) in diameter. It was named after Belarusian–Soviet astronomer Vitold Cerasky (1849–1925).

== Orbit and classification ==
Ceraskia is a core member the Eos family (606), the largest asteroid family of the outer main belt consisting of nearly 10,000 known asteroids. It orbits the Sun in the outer asteroid belt at a distance of 2.8–3.2 AU once every 5 years and 3 months (1,913 days; semi-major axis of 3.02 AU). Its orbit has an eccentricity of 0.07 and an inclination of 11° with respect to the ecliptic. The asteroid was first observed as A909 BK at Heidelberg Observatory on 18 January 1909. The body's observation arc begins at Vienna Observatory on 4 May 1915, or two weeks after its official discovery observation at Heidelberg by Max Wolf.

== Naming ==
This minor planet was named after Vitold Cerasky (1849–1925), a Belarusian–Soviet astronomer, professor of astronomy at Moscow University and long-time director of the Moscow Observatory (105). According to Nikolai Chernykh, Cerasky worked extensively on stellar and solar photometry. His name is often transliterated as Vitold Tserasky and Witold Karlovich Ceraski. The lunar crater Tseraskiy is named after him. His wife, Lidiya Tseraskaya (1855–1931), who was also an astronomer, was honored by the crater Tseraskaya on Venus.

The official naming citation was incorrect in the previous three editions of Dictionary of Minor Planet Names, which was based on The Names of the Minor Planets by Paul Herget in 1955 (H 80).

== Physical characteristics ==
In the Tholen classification, Ceraskia is a common, stony S-type asteroid. In the taxonomic classification based on near-infrared colors from the MOVIS-catalog, the asteroid is a Cgx-subtype that is closest to a carbonaceous C-type and somewhat similar to an uncommon G-type and X-type asteroid. The MOVIS catalog was created from data gather by the VISTA Hemisphere Survey conducted with the VISTA telescope at Paranal Observatory in Chile.

=== Rotation period ===
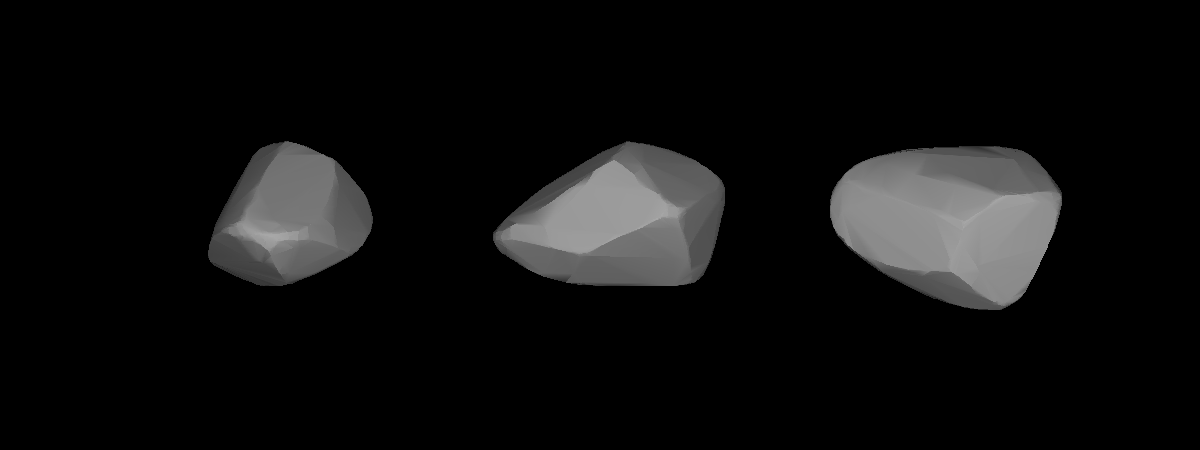
A three-dimensional model of 807 Ceraskia based on its light curve

In October 2017, a rotational lightcurve of Ceraskia was obtained from photometric observations by Matthieu Conjat at Nice Observatory (020) in France. Lightcurve analysis gave a well-defined rotation period of 7.368±0.002 hours with a brightness variation of 0.39±0.01 magnitude (U=3). The result supersedes previous observations by Richard Binzel in April 1983 and by astronomers at the Palomar Transient Factory in California in October 2012, which gave a period of 7.4 and 7.375±0.0030 hours with an amplitude of 0.25 and 0.49 magnitude, respectively (U=2/2).

Lightcurve inversion also modeled the body's shape and poles. In 2013, modelling by an international study using photometric data from the US Naval Observatory, the Uppsala Asteroid Photometric Catalogue, the Palomar Transient Factory and the Catalina Sky Survey gave a concurring sidereal period of 7.37390±0.00002 hours and two spin axes of (325.0°, 23.0°) and (132.0°, 26.0°) in ecliptic coordinates (λ, β). The body's very elongated shape had already been indicated by the relatively high brightness variation measured during the direct photometric observations.

=== Diameter and albedo ===
According to the surveys carried out by the NEOWISE mission of NASA's Wide-field Infrared Survey Explorer (WISE), the Infrared Astronomical Satellite IRAS, and the Japanese Akari satellite, Ceraskia measures (21.241±0.270), (26.24±1.3) and (30.38±0.56) kilometers in diameter and its surface has an albedo of (0.207±0.025), (0.1532±0.016) and (30.38±0.56), respectively. The Collaborative Asteroid Lightcurve Link derives an albedo of 0.1368 and a diameter of 26.15 kilometers based on an absolute magnitude of 10.69. Alternative mean-diameter measurements published by the WISE team include (21.361±0.302 km) and (22.83±1.91 km) with corresponding albedos of (0.2071±0.0485) and (0.222±0.091).
