= Zeldovich equation of state =

Equation of state

Zeldovich equation of state refers to an equation of state, proposed by Yakov Zeldovich in 1962, to describe matter at ultra-high densities. It is characterized by extreme rigidity and relativistic consistency, in which the pressure is equal to the energy density. Because of this, matter obeying the Zeldovich equation of state is often referred to as a stiff fluid or stiff matter. In such a medium, the speed of sound reaches the causal upper limit, equal to the speed of light.

== Description ==
The Zeldovich equation of state reads

$$p = \varepsilon$$

where $p$ is the pressure and $\varepsilon$ is the energy density. By relating energy density $\varepsilon$ to the mass density $\rho$ via the mass–energy equivalence, i.e., $\varepsilon =\rho c^2$ (neglecting other internal energy contributions which is not a bad approximation for cold matter), where $c$ is the speed of light, the speed of sound becomes

$$c_s^2 = c^2 \frac{dp}{d\varepsilon} = c^2.$$

Thus, the Zeldovich equation of state represents the stiffest possible causal equation of state, with sound waves propagating at the speed of light. With $\varepsilon =\rho c^2$, the equation of state in polytropic form is given by

$$p = K\rho^{1+\frac{1}{n}}, \quad n \to \infty, \quad K=c^2.$$

The $n\to\infty$ corresponds to the isothermal limit.

== Cosmological context ==
The Zeldovich equation of state corresponds to an equation of state parameter

$$q = \frac{p}{\varepsilon} = 1$$

the maximum value consistent with causality. For comparison:

- A radiation-dominated fluid has $q = 1/3$, so pressure is one third of the energy density. In that case, the cosmic scale factor evolves as $a(t) \propto t^{1/2}$.
- A non-relativistic matter-dominated fluid has $q = 0$ (a dust), with negligible pressure compared to energy density, leading to $a(t) \propto t^{2/3}$.
- A stiff matter–dominated universe with $q = 1$ evolves as $a(t) \propto t^{1/3}$, meaning it decelerates more strongly than radiation or matter dominated eras.

This contrast highlights how the Zeldovich equation of state provides the upper bound on stiffness and compressibility of any physical medium.

== Applications ==
Zeldovich originally proposed this relation in connection with cold baryonic matter at extremely high densities (such as those in neutron star interiors), leading to the scaling $p=\varepsilon\sim n^2$, where $n$ is the baryon number density. Thus, in astrophysics, the Zeldovich equation of state is often used as a limiting case when modelling compact stars via the Tolman–Oppenheimer–Volkoff equation. It provides an upper bound on how compact a star can be for a given mass.

In cosmology, it has also been employed in early universe models as a representation of stiff matter.
