= Gennady S. Bisnovatyi-Kogan =

Russian astronomer

Gennady Bisnovatyi-Kogan
- Геннадий Бисноватый-Коган
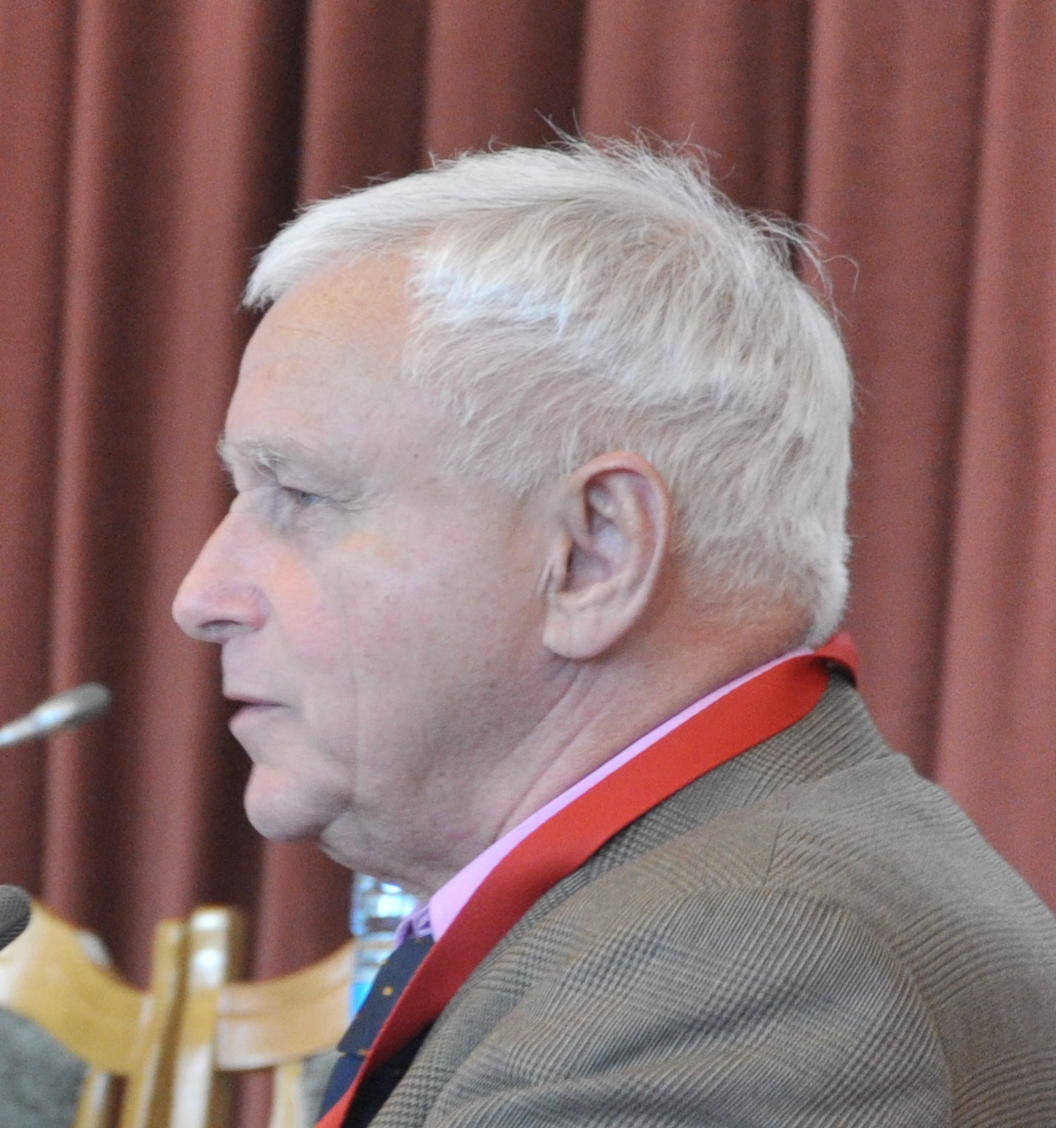
- Bisnovatyi-Kogan in 2014
- Born: December 6, 1941 (age 84); Michailovka, Saratov region, Russia
- Education: Moscow Institute of Physics and Technology; Keldysh Institute of Applied Mathematics
- Scientific career
- Fields: Physics
- Workplaces: Profsoyuznaya Russian Space Research Institute (IKI) Moscow
- Doctoral students: Marina Romanova

Gennady Semyonovych Bisnovatyi-Kogan is an astrophysicist. He is known for predicting binary radio pulsars.

Bisnovatyi-Kogan was a student at Moscow Institute of Physics and Technology from 1958-1964. He was a postgraduate student at Moscow Institute of Physics and Technology and Keldysh Institute of Applied Mathematics from 1964-1967.

Bisnovatyi-Kogan's PhD thesis was titled "Late stages of stellar evolution" (1968, Keldysh Institute of Applied Mathematics). His doctoral thesis was titled "The equilibrium and stability of stars and stellar systems" (1977, Russian Space Research Institute).

He was employed as a Junior Scientific Fellow at Keldysh Institute of Applied Mathematics from 1967-1974. Since 1974 he has worked at the Russian Space Research Institute.
