= IC 4444 =

Galaxy in the constellation Lupus

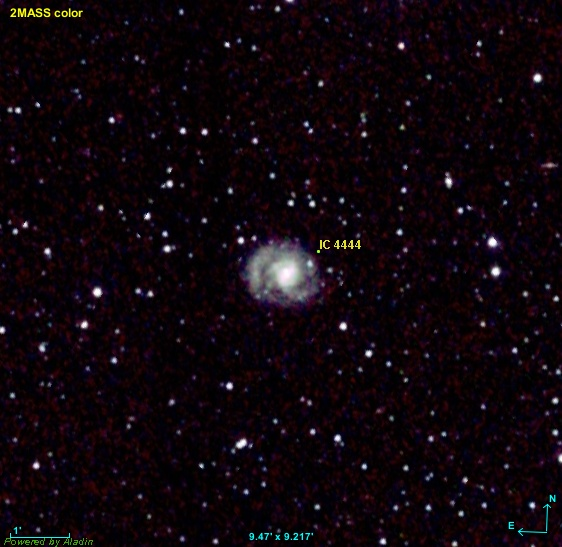
- IC 4441 imaged in infrared by 2MASS

Observation data (J2000 epoch)
- Constellation: Lupus
- Right ascension: 14^{h} 31^{m} 38.666^{s}
- Declination: −43° 25′ 06.05″
- Redshift: 0.006535 ± 0.000018
- Heliocentric radial velocity: 1,959 ± 5 km/s
- Distance: 57.8 ± 19.7 Mly (17.7 ± 6.0 Mpc)
- Apparent magnitude (V): 11.4

Characteristics
- Type: (R')SA:(s)bc
- Size: ~40,000 ly (12.4 kpc) (estimated)
- Apparent size (V): 1.7′ × 1.4′

Other designations
- IC 4444, ESO 272- G 014, AM 1428-431, MCG -07-30-002, IRAS 14284-4311, PGC 51905

IC 4444 is a spiral galaxy in the constellation Lupus. The galaxy lies about 60 million light years away from Earth, which means, given its apparent dimensions, that IC 4444 is approximately 40,000 light years across. It was discovered by Lewis Swift on 28 March 1897 and listed as IC 4441, however there is no object in the coordinates mentioned by Swift, and thus IC 4441 has been identified as the same object as nearby IC 4444, which was discovered by DeLisle Stewart in 1899.

IC 4444 has a well-defined bar embedded in a small and faint galactic bulge. There may be a complete inner ring. The spiral pattern is asymmetric, with at least three spiral arms, which emerge from the ends of the bar, two arms from the northwest end and one from the southeast. The southeast arms can be traced for a quarter of a revolution before fading. From the northwest end one arm is short and wraps tightly and features many star formation knots and the other is more loose and can be traced for a half revolution before fading. It features a region of intense star formation. The star formation rate of the galaxy is estimated to be about 5.9 M_{☉} per year.

One supernova has been observed in IC 4444, SN 2009G. It was discovered on 5 January 2009 at an apparent magnitude of 16.5 by the CHASE project using the 0.41-m 'PROMPT 4' telescope located at Cerro Tololo Inter-American Observatory. It was identified spectographically as a type II-P supernova about three months past explosion.

IC 4444 forms a pair with ESO 272-012 and lies in a galaxy cloud which also includes the galaxies IC 4362, IC 4386, IC 4402, and NGC 5483.
