= Zeldovich mechanism =

Chemical mechanism

Zel'dovich mechanism is a chemical mechanism that describes the oxidation of nitrogen and NO_{x} formation, first proposed by the Russian physicist Yakov Borisovich Zel'dovich in 1946. The reaction mechanisms read as

$$\ce{{N2} + O <-> [k_1] {NO} + {N}}$$
$$\ce{{N} + O2 <-> [k_2] {NO} + {O}}$$

where $k_1$ and $k_2$ are the reaction rate constants in Arrhenius law. The overall global reaction is given by

$$\ce{{N2} + {O2} <-> [k] 2NO}$$

The overall reaction rate is mostly governed by the first reaction (i.e., rate-determining reaction), since the second reaction is much faster than the first reaction and occurs immediately following the first reaction. At fuel-rich conditions, due to lack of oxygen, reaction 2 becomes weak, hence, a third reaction is included in the mechanism, also known as extended Zel'dovich mechanism (with all three reactions),

$$\ce{{N} + {OH} <-> [k_3] {NO} + {H}}$$

Assuming the initial concentration of NO is low and the reverse reactions can therefore be ignored, the forward rate constants of the reactions are given by

$$\begin{align}
k_{1f} &= 1.47\times 10^{13} \, T^{0.3} \mathrm e^{-75286.81/RT}\\
k_{2f} &= 6.40\times 10^9 \, T \mathrm e^{-6285.5/RT} \\
k_{3f} &= 3.80\times 10^{13}
\end{align}$$

where the pre-exponential factor is measured in units of cm, mol, s and K (these units are incorrect), temperature in kelvins, and the activation energy in cal/mol; R is the universal gas constant.

== NO formation ==
The rate of NO concentration increase is given by

$$\frac{d[\mathrm{NO}]}{dt}= k_{1f} [\mathrm{N}_2] [\mathrm{O}] + k_{2f} [\mathrm{N}] [\mathrm{O}_2] + k_{3f} [\mathrm{N}] [\mathrm{OH}] - k_{1b} [\mathrm{NO}] [\mathrm{N}] - k_{2b} [\mathrm{NO}] [\mathrm{O}] - k_{3b} [\mathrm{NO}] [\mathrm{H}]$$

== N formation ==
Similarly, the rate of N concentration increase is

$$\frac{d[\mathrm{N}]}{dt}= k_{1f} [\mathrm{N}_2] [\mathrm{O}] - k_{2f} [\mathrm{N}] [\mathrm{O}_2] - k_{3f} [\mathrm{N}] [\mathrm{OH}] - k_{1b} [\mathrm{NO}] [\mathrm{N}] + k_{2b} [\mathrm{NO}] [\mathrm{O}] + k_{3b} [\mathrm{NO}] [\mathrm{H}]$$

== See also ==
- Zeldovich–Liñán model
