= Wargo (crater) =

Crater on the Moon

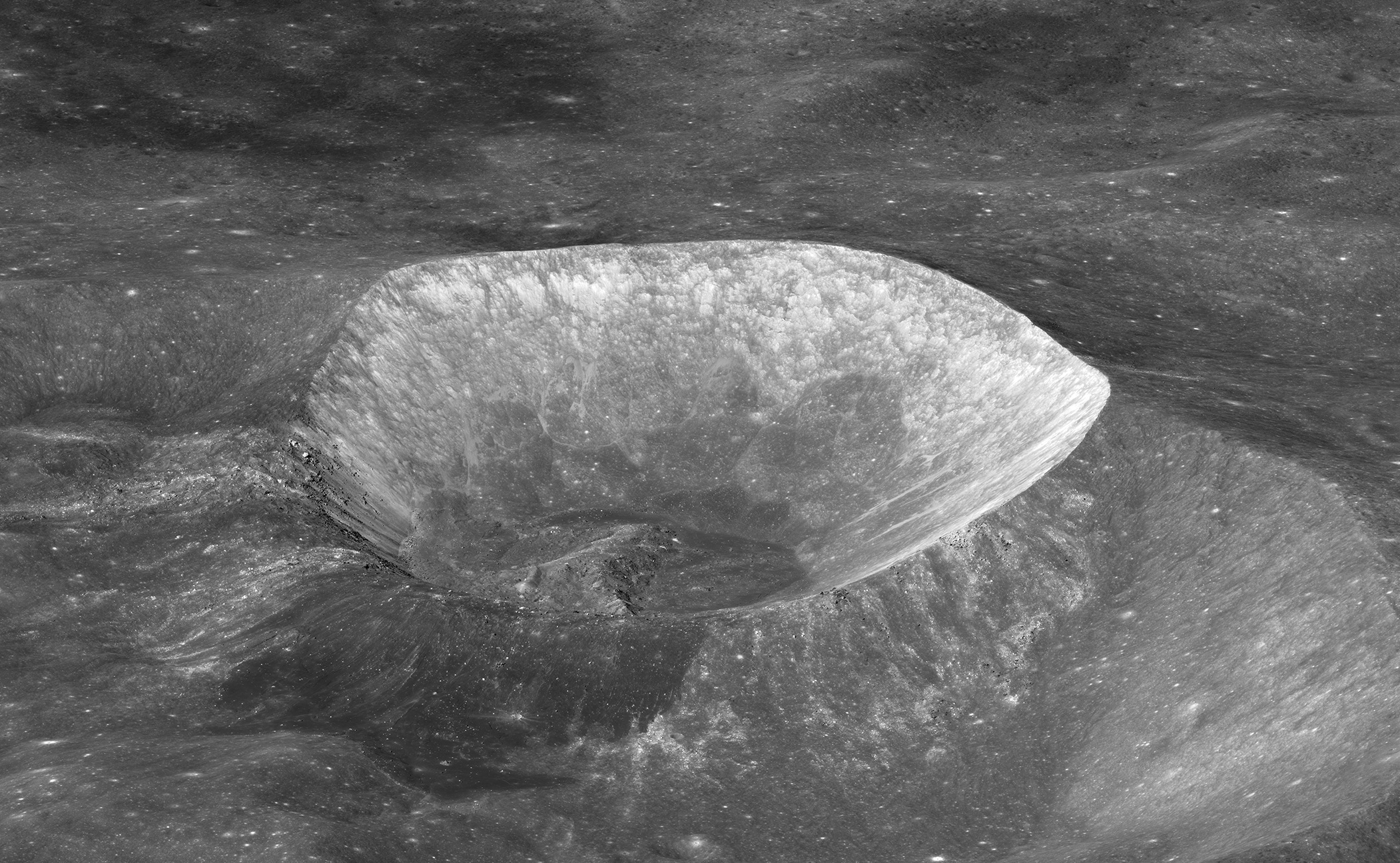
- LRO image of Wargo crater
- Coordinates: 27.68°N 148.62°W
- Diameter: 13.9 km (8.6 mi)
- Depth: ≈910 m (3,000 ft)
- Colongitude: 149° at sunrise
- Eponym: Michael J. Wargo

Wargo is a lunar crater on the far side of the Moon. It is located to the south of Blazhko, and to the west of Joule.

Wargo is a fresh crater with a prominent ray system. It lies on the western rim of Joule T, a satellite crater of Joule, and was formed by an asteroid about a thousand meters across (several thousand feet) impacting the ridge of Joule T at 5 to 19 kilometres per second (3 to 12 mi/s). The crater is 13.9 km (8.6 mi) in diameter and approximately 910 m (3,000 ft) in depth.

The crater was unnamed until its name was approved in 2017 by the IAU. It is named after former NASA Chief Exploration Scientist Michael J. Wargo.
