= 14789 GAISH =

Asteroid discovered in 1969

14789 GAISh
Discovery
- Discovered by: L. Chernykh
- Discovery site: Crimean Astrophysical Obs.
- Discovery date: 8 October 1969

Designations
- Named after: Sternberg Astronomical Institute (GAISh) (Moscow State University)
- Alternative designations: 1969 TY_{1} · 1995 KQ_{2} 1996 QW_{2} · 1999 CH_{69}
- Minor planet category: main-belt · (outer) background

Orbital characteristics
- Epoch 23 March 2018 (JD 2458200.5)
- Uncertainty parameter 0
- Observation arc: 47.65 yr (17,405 d)
- Aphelion: 3.4121 AU
- Perihelion: 2.8333 AU
- Semi-major axis: 3.1227 AU
- Eccentricity: 0.0927
- Orbital period (sidereal): 5.52 yr (2,016 d)
- Mean anomaly: 301.75°
- Mean motion: 0° 10^{m} 42.96^{s} / day
- Inclination: 5.8175°
- Longitude of ascending node: 200.22°
- Argument of perihelion: 161.64°

Physical characteristics
- Mean diameter: 11.42 km (calculated); 15.256±0.211 km
- Synodic rotation period: 8.086±0.0032 h
- Geometric albedo: 0.057 (assumed); 0.076±0.017
- Spectral type: C (assumed)
- Absolute magnitude (H): 12.5; 12.8; 12.990±0.008 (R); 13.44

14789 GAISh, provisional designation 1969 TY_{1}, is a dark background asteroid from the outer regions of the asteroid belt, approximately 15 kilometers (9 miles) in diameter. It was discovered on 8 October 1969, by Soviet astronomer Lyudmila Chernykh of the Crimean Astrophysical Observatory at Nauchnij, on the Crimean peninsula. The assumed C-type asteroid has a rotation period of 8.1 hours and possibly an elongated shape. It was named for the Russian Sternberg Astronomical Institute (GAISh) of Moscow State University.

== Orbit and classification ==
GAISh is a non-family asteroid from the main belt's background population. It orbits the Sun in the outer asteroid belt at a distance of 2.8–3.4 AU once every 5 years and 6 months (2,016 days; semi-major axis of 3.12 AU). Its orbit has an eccentricity of 0.09 and an inclination of 6° with respect to the ecliptic. The body's observation arc begins with its official discovery observation in October 1969.

== Physical characteristics ==
GAISh is an assumed carbonaceous C-type asteroid.

=== Rotation period ===
In October 2010, a rotational lightcurve of GAISh was obtained from photometric observations in the R-band by astronomers at the Palomar Transient Factory in California. Lightcurve analysis gave a rotation period of 8.086 hours with a high brightness amplitude of 0.82 magnitude, indicative of a non-spherical shape (U=2).

=== Diameter and albedo ===
According to the survey carried out by the NEOWISE mission of NASA's Wide-field Infrared Survey Explorer, GAISh measures 15.256 kilometers in diameter and its surface has an albedo of 0.076. The Collaborative Asteroid Lightcurve Link assumes a standard albedo for a carbonaceous asteroid of 0.057 and calculates a diameter of 11.42 kilometers based on an absolute magnitude of 13.44.

== Naming ==
This minor planet was named after the Sternberg Astronomical Institute (GAISh, ГАИШ), a division of Moscow State University. Founded in 1931, it is one of Russia's leading astronomical institute and a principal educational facility for professional astronomers. The institute is located on the site of the 1931-built Sternberg Observatory. The official naming citation was published by the Minor Planet Center on 6 January 2007 (M.P.C. 58595).
