= Vitold Tserasky =

Russian astronomer and inventor

Vitold Karlovich Tserasky
- Витольд Карлович Цераский
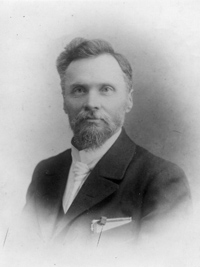
- Vitold Tserasky in 1882
- Born: May 9, 1849
- Died: May 29, 1925 (aged 76)
- Occupations: Astronomer and inventor
- Known for: Asteroid 807 Ceraskia, crater Tseraskiy are named after him

Vitold Karlovich Tserasky also spelled Witold Cerasky (Russian:Витольд Карлович Цераский; 9 May 1849 – 29 May 1925) was a Russian astronomer and inventor of astronomical tools and techniques. The asteroid 807 Ceraskia and the Lunar crater Tseraskiy are named after him.

Tserasky was born in Slutsk, Minsk where his father of Polish–Lithuanian descent was a geography teacher. A visit of Donati's comet in 1858 sparked an interest in Tserasky and he joined Moscow University in 1867 where he spent time at the astronomical observatory (105). He joined the astronomical observatory as an assistant and made a trip in 1874 to Kyakhta to make observations on the transit of Venus. He then took an interest in astronomical photography and in 1883 he received a master's degree for techniques in determining the brightness of white stars. He invented techniques which are now used in the Zöllner-Tserasky photometer. He began to teach in the Higher school for women from the 1870s and married the astronomer Lidiya Petrovna Shelekhova in 1884. Lidiya is known for discovering numerous variable stars. He became a professor of astronomy in 1889. In 1890 he became director of the Moscow observatory. He retired in 1916 in Feodosia, Crimea but returned to live with his son in Moscow where he died.
