= Zeldovich approximation =

Method in cosmology and astrophysics

Zeldovich approximation is a method in cosmology and astrophysics for describing the nonlinear evolution of the large-scale structure of the universe, particularly the formation of galaxies and clusters from initial density perturbations. It was introduced by Yakov Zeldovich in 1970. The approximation provides a relatively simple way to model the growth of structure in the early universe, bridging the gap between linear theory and fully nonlinear simulations.

== Mathematical description ==
In the early universe, small density fluctuations grew under the influence of gravity, eventually forming galaxies, clusters, and the cosmic web. Linear perturbation theory can accurately describe the initial stages of this growth, but it fails once perturbations become large. The Zeldovich approximation offers a first-order nonlinear solution that tracks the motion of particles in an expanding universe, providing insight into the early stages of structure formation.

The Zeldovich approximation is based on the idea that the comoving position of a particle at time $t$, denoted $\mathbf x(t)$ (note that the proper coordinate can be given by $\mathbf r(t)=a(t)\mathbf x(t)$ where $a(t)$ is the cosmic scale factor), can be expressed in terms of its initial Lagrangian position $\mathbf q$ and a displacement field $\mathbf u$:

$$\mathbf x(\mathbf q,t) = \mathbf q + \sigma(t) \mathbf u(\mathbf q)$$

where

- $\mathbf q$ is the initial (Lagrangian) position,
- $\sigma(t)$ is the linear growth factor of density perturbations,
- $\mathbf u$ is the initial displacement vector determined by the initial density field.

Note that $\mathbf u$ depends only on the initial position $\mathbf q$ and is independent of time. This approximation assumes that particles move along straight trajectories determined by their initial displacements, scaled by the growth factor. It captures some aspects of nonlinear evolution, such as caustics and pancake structures, while preserving the linear density–velocity relation.

The peculiar velocity in the Zeldovich approximation becomes

$$\mathbf v(\mathbf q,t) = a(t) \frac{d\mathbf x}{dt} = a(t)\dot{\sigma}(t)\mathbf u(\mathbf q).$$

The density field can also be expressed using the Jacobian of the transformation from Lagrangian to Eulerian coordinates,

$$\rho(\mathbf x,t) = \frac{\rho_0}{\mathrm{det}\left(\frac{\partial\mathbf x}{\partial \mathbf q}\right)}=\frac{\rho_0}{\mathrm{det}\left(\mathbf I + \sigma(t)\frac{\partial\mathbf u}{\partial \mathbf q}\right)},$$

where $\rho_0$ is the mean background density.

=== Irrotational displacement field and linear density contrast ===
In the Zeldovich approximation, the displacement field $\mathbf u(\mathbf q)$ is assumed to be potential, meaning it can be written as the gradient of a scalar potential,

$$\mathbf u(\mathbf q) = \nabla_{\mathbf q} \Phi(\mathbf q)$$

where $\Phi(\mathbf q)$ is the Lagrangian potential related to the initial density perturbations. This implies that the displacement field is irrotational, i.e.,$\nabla_{\mathbf q} \times \mathbf u(\mathbf q) = 0$. Physically, this means there is no initial vorticity in the displacement field, consistent with standard cosmological initial conditions (generated from inflation, which produces only scalar perturbations at first order). Moreover, the peculiar velocity is also irrotational before shell-crossing, $\nabla_{\mathbf x} \times \mathbf v(\mathbf x, t) = 0$.

The scalar potential can be related to the initial density contrast $\delta\rho/\rho_0=(\rho-\rho_0)/\rho_0$ via a Poisson-like equation,

$$\nabla_{\mathbf q} \cdot \mathbf u(\mathbf q) = \nabla_{\mathbf q}^2 \Phi(\mathbf q) = \frac{\delta \rho}{\rho_0}(\mathbf q)$$.

In the linear regime (first order in $\sigma(t)$), the Eulerian density simplifies to:

$$\rho(\mathbf{x}, t) \approx \rho_0 \left( 1 + \sigma(t) \nabla_{\mathbf q} \cdot \mathbf u(\mathbf q) \right)$$

and using the potential form, the fractional density perturbation becomes:

$$\frac{\delta \rho}{\rho_0} \approx -\sigma(t) \nabla_{\mathbf q}^2 \Phi(\mathbf q)$$.

This shows that, in the linear regime, the fractional density perturbation is proportional to the Laplacian of the Lagrangian potential.

== Applications and limitations ==
The Zeldovich approximation is widely used to model the formation of pancakes and filaments in the cosmic web, to generate initial conditions for N-body simulations and to provide insight into the early nonlinear evolution of density perturbations before shell-crossing.

After shell-crossing, the approximation fails because multiple streams of matter occupy the same Eulerian position, leading to caustics that the approximation cannot resolve. It cannot model vorticity generation or fully nonlinear collapse. Accuracy decreases at small scales, so it is primarily useful for large-scale structure analysis and early-time evolution.
