= Tseraskiy (crater) =

Crater on the Moon

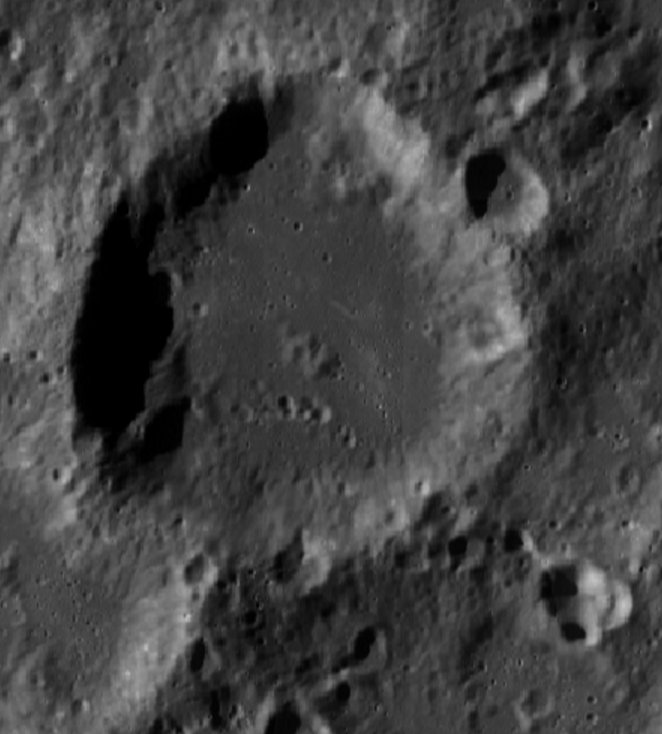
- Imaged by the Lunar Reconnaissance Orbiter
- Coordinates: 49.0°S 141.6°E
- Diameter: 65.59 km
- Depth: Unknown
- Colongitude: 219° at sunrise
- Eponym: Vitol'd K. Tseraskiy

Tseraskiy (Ceraski) is an impact crater on the Moon's far side, approximately 66 kilometers (41 mi) in diameter. It is located to the north-northeast of a huge walled plain called Planck, and to the southeast of the crater Pauli. To the east-northeast of Tseraskiy is Crocco.

This is an eroded crater formation and the outer rim has been steady worn down to a roughly circular ridge with rounded edges. This crater overlies an older crater along the southwest side. There is a small crater along the exterior of the rim to the northeast. The interior floor is relatively level and is marked by several small and tiny craterlets, particularly in the western half.

This crater is named after Polish-Russian astronomer Vitol'd K. Tseraskiy (1849–1925). In some publications name has been spelt as Ceraski.

== Satellite craters ==
By convention these features are identified on lunar maps by placing the letter on the side of the crater midpoint that is closest to Tseraskiy.

Tseraskiy	Latitude	Longitude	Diameter	Ref
K	53.0° S	144.6° E	42.7 km	WGPSN
P	51.3° S	139.6° E	38.34 km	WGPSN

== See also ==
- Asteroid 807 Ceraskia
