= Institute of Problems of Chemical Physics =

Scientific institution

- Established: 1956
- Address: Academician Semenov avenue 1, Chernogolovka, Moscow region, 142432 Russian Federation
- Location: Chernogolovka, Russia
- Website: http://www.icp.ac.ru/

The Institute of Problems of Chemical Physics (IPCP) (Russian: Институт проблем химической физики РАН) of the Russian Academy of Sciences (RAS) consists of 10 scientific departments and about 100 laboratories each one held by an independent research groups.

IPCP was established in 1956 as branch of the Moscow Institute of Chemical Physics.

== See also ==
- Mathematical chemistry
- Aizik Volpert
