= MASTER =

Russian network of automated telescopes

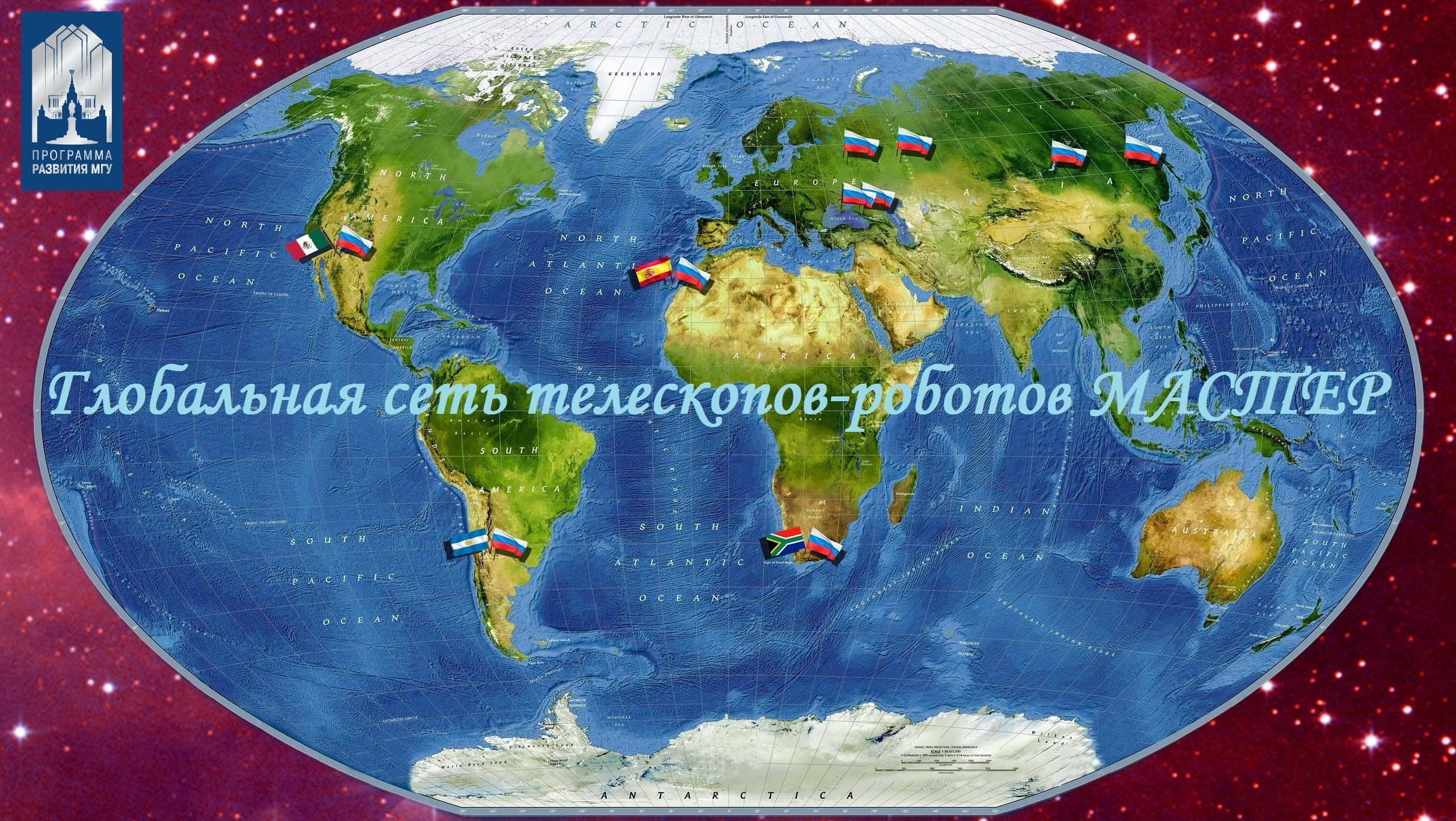
Map of the location of the telescopes of the Master network

MASTER (Mobile Astronomical System of Telescope-Robots) is an international network of Russian fully robotic telescopes.

The telescopes are located in five Russian sites, in South Africa, Argentina, Mexica and the Canary Islands. The system is intended to react quickly to reports of transient astronomical events. It started its development in 2002 under the supervision of Vladimir Lipunov and has been in fully autonomous operations since 2011.

On 17 August 2017, an autonomous MASTER telescope in Argentina successfully recorded a collision of neutron stars some 130 million light-years away (see GW170817 for details).

== Types of observed objects ==
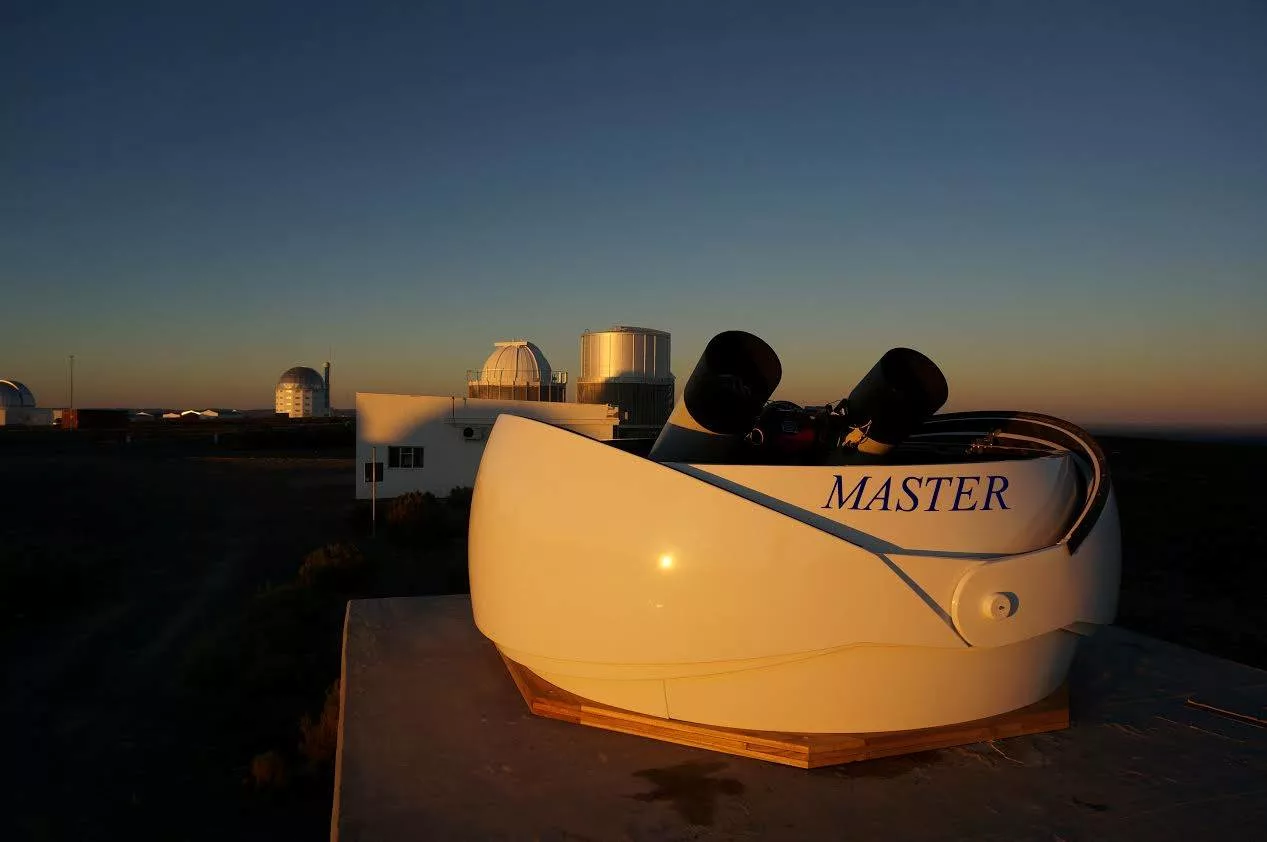
A MASTER telescope in South Africa

Master is designed to search for optical transients. These include:

- GRB
- Supernovae
- Kilonova
- Novae
- Asteroids, including potentially dangerous ones
- Cataclysmic variables
- Optical orphan flares
- Comets

== Main discoveries ==
- Independent discovery of kilonova on August 17, 2017 (see GW170817)
- Detection of optical polarization of gamma-ray bursts' prompt radiation
- Observation of the brightest gamma-ray burst in history

=== Comets ===
Comet MASTER may refer to any of the five comets discovered by the survey:

- C/2015 G2 (MASTER)
- C/2015 K1 (MASTER)
- C/2016 N4 (MASTER)
- C/2020 F5 (MASTER)
- C/2021 K2 (MASTER)
- C/2026 M3 (MASTER)

== See also ==
- List of astronomical observatories
- List of astronomical societies
- Lists of telescopes
