= Sternberg Astronomical Institute =

Research institute in Moscow, Russia

Coordinates: 55°42′04″N 37°32′34″E

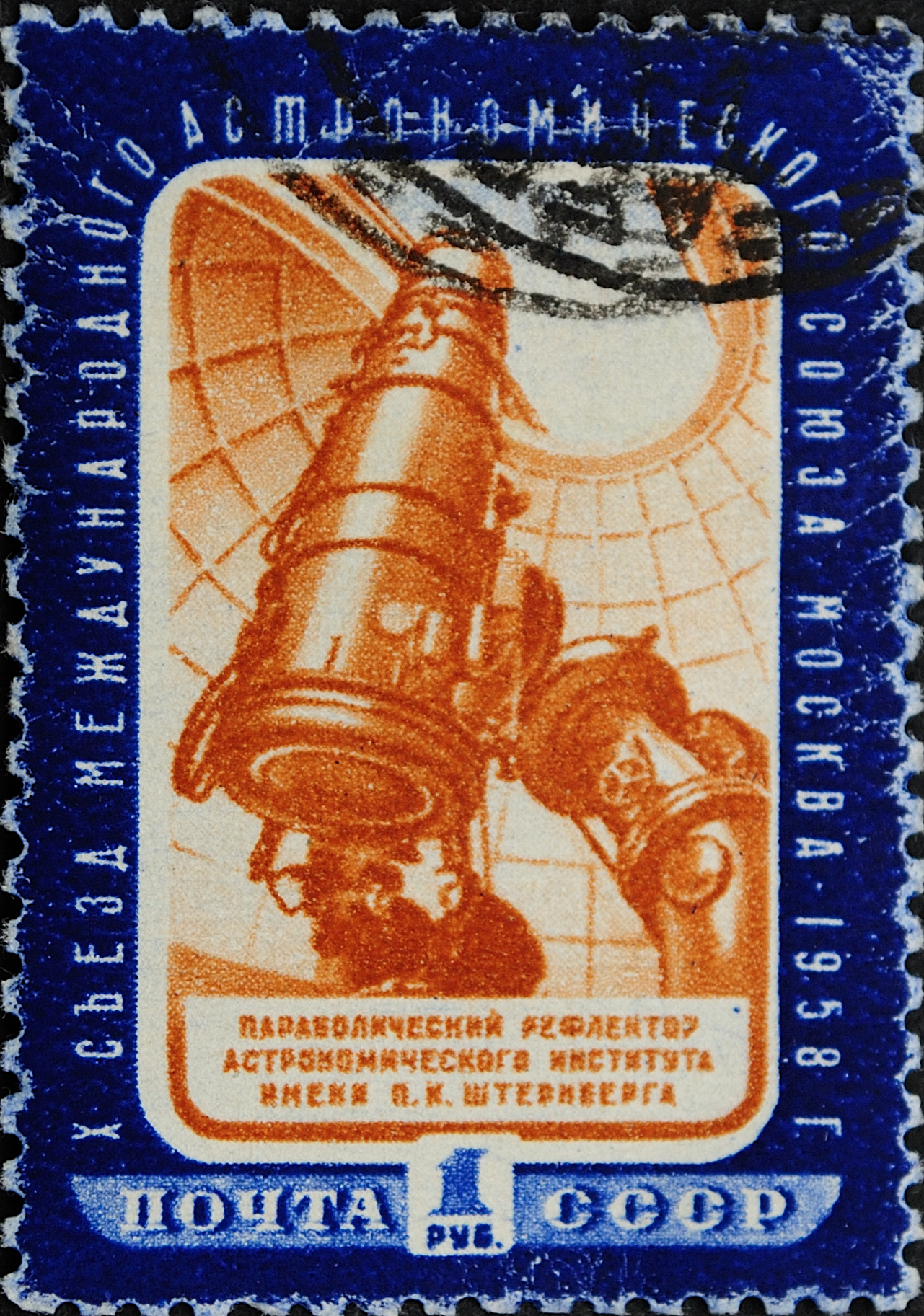
Telescope of GAISh, USSR 1958

The Sternberg Astronomical Institute, or GAISh, is a research institution in Moscow, Russia, a division of Moscow State University. In Russian it is named Государственный астрономический институт имени Штернберга or ГАИШ, respectively. The institute is named after astronomer Pavel Karlovich Shternberg. It was founded in 1931, on the site of the observatory established by the university in 1831.

The main-belt asteroid 14789 GAISH, discovered by Lyudmila Chernykh at the Crimean Astrophysical Observatory in 1969, was named in its honour. The official naming citation was published on 6 January 2007 (M.P.C. 58595).
