= Konstantin Petrzhak =

Russian nuclear physicist

- Константин Антонович Петржак
- K. A. Petrzhak, photo from the archive of Radium Institute
- Born: Konstantin Antonovich Petrzhak; September 4, 1907; Łuków, Siedlce Governorate, Poland in Russian Empire ((Present-day, Łuków in Poland)
- Died: October 10, 1998 (aged 91); Saint Petersburg, Russia
- Citizenship: Russia
- Education: Leningrad State University
- Known for: Discovery of spontaneous fission Soviet atomic bomb project
- Awards: Stalin Prize (1950)
- Scientific career
- Fields: Physics
- Workplaces: Khlopin Radium Institute
- Thesis: Study of thorium and samarium radioactivity (1948)

Konstantin Antonovich Petrzhak (alternatively Pietrzak; Russian: Константи́н Анто́нович Пе́тржак, IPA: [kənstɐnʲˈtʲin ɐnˈtonəvʲɪtɕ ˈpʲedʐək], Polish: [ˈpjɛt.ʂak]; 4 September 1907 – 10 October 1998), D.Sc., was a Russian physicist of Polish origin, and a professor of physics at the Saint Petersburg State University.

Receiving credit with Georgy Flyorov, a physicist, for the fundamental discovery of spontaneous fission of uranium in 1940, Petrzhak's career in physics was then spent mostly in the former Soviet program of nuclear weapons. Konstantin Petrzhak was among of Soviet pioneers in nuclear physics research.

== Biography ==
=== Early and personal life ===
Konstantin Petrzhak was born in Łuków, Poland in Russian Empire, on 4 September 1907. Other Russian documented sources noted his birthplace in Dombrovo in Kaliningrad with same birth date. There is very little information known about his early life and started working at the age of 12 (in 1919) as a painter at a glass-making factory in Malaya Vishera in Russia to provide income to his poor family. In 1928, Petrzhak was sent to attend the trade school, Rabfak, that was affiliated with the Leningrad State University, where he studied painting which remained his lifelong passion. Later, he used his talent in painting when he covered the plates of ionization chamber with uranium which later led to discovery of spontaneous fission. He also learned to play the music and was an amateur violinist and guitar player.

Peterzhak went to the Leningrad State University worked with the research group at the university in 1931. In November 1936, Pertzhak eventually earned his diploma certified under Igor Kurchatov from the Leningrad State University.

Konstantin Petrzhak married Galina Ivanovna Mitrofanova (b. 1918), also a radiochemist.

In 1934, Petrzhak found a job at the Khlopin Radium Institute located in the State University in Saint Petersburg (First Radium Institute), which was directed by Igor Kurchatov, a nuclear physicist.

Petrzhak remained associated with the Khlopin Radium Institute for the remainder of his life, and worked under the direction of Vitaly Khlopin and Igor Kurchatov where he eventually defended his thesis at the Ioffe Institute to obtain the Candidate of Sciences, titled: "Study of thorium and samarium radioactivity."

=== Soviet program of nuclear weapons and academia ===
In 1939, Kurchatov was assigned research under Georgy Flyorov and Petrzhak to conduct investigation on uranium fission induced by neutrons of different energy levels, following Yakov Frenkel's theory of fission. Earlier, Flyorov and his assistant Tatiana I. Nikitinskaya had already made an ionization chamber to detect heavy particles, and were directed to increase the sensitivity of the ionization chamber. The team created a multilayer ionization chamber to detect decay products originating from the fission of uranium.

The ionization chamber utilized electrodes with a total surface area of about 1000 cm^{2}. The chamber's 15 plates were covered with uranium oxide with approximate surface density of 10–20 mg/cm^{2}. The detector compared particle activity to a background level control. When the source of neutrons was taken away, the detector still found particles. The team made three ionization chambers to prove that the effect was not an error, including a more sensitive chamber with a surface area of 6000 cm^{2}. Despite the instrument's high sensitivity, cosmic rays were still a possible source of particle activity. The team moved to an underground lab in the Dinamo station of Moscow Metro (about 50 m below the earth surface) in an attempt to rule out the effects of cosmic rays. In May 1940, they were confident that they had discovered spontaneous fission. The certificate of discovery stated, "the new type of radioactivity with mother nucleus decays into two nuclei, that have kinetic energy of about 160 MeV". Later, the discovery of spontaneous fission was confirmed by Otto Robert Frisch.

In 1940, Petrzhak was recommended for the top team in the Soviet atomic bomb project. He is rumored to have participated in the said project.

When the Soviet Union entered World War II, Petrzhak was eligible to serve in the Red Army. Winning the Stalin Prize would exempt him from front line service. In the early 1940s, the Academy of Sciences of the Soviet Union nominated him for the award, which he did not receive. Sources disagree on whether Petrzhak volunteered, or was drafted into the army.

Petrzhak served in the military intelligence company of a CIWS regiment first as a junior lieutenant, and later as a senior lieutenant. On 28 June 1941, he participated in the battle of Karelian Isthmus. Later, he fought in Volkhov Front. On 20th of March 1942 he was ordered to leave the army and join evacuated Radium Institute scientists in Kazan.

In 1943, Petrzhak studied neutron induced fission of uranium under the supervision of professor Pyotr Lukirsky. In 1944, Petrzhak proposed a method to determine the number of neutrons present during a nuclear reaction, based on the number of protons. He also participated in the development of technology to extract plutonium from irradiated uranium blocks. Jointly with M. Yakunin, Petrzhak developed methods for the radiochemical determination of plutonium, and found the mean free path of Pu-239 alpha particles. Petrzhak founded a laboratory of neutron physics and nuclear fission at the Khlopin Radium Institute in 1947. He was the head of this laboratory until 1986, when he became a part-time contractor.

In 1949, Petrzhak was appointed a member of the Uranium Commission of the Soviet Academy of Sciences. He was one of the founders of the Engineering faculty of the Saint Petersburg State Institute of Technology. Petrzhak founded the Saint Petersburg State Institute of Technology department of nuclear physics in 1949, and remained its chair for 22 years. Hundreds of graduates of Engineering faculty studied under his supervision, he was also a scientific supervisor of dozens of Candidates of Science and Doktors of Science.

Konstantin Petrzhak created an express method to detect plutonium and associated radioisotopes in samples of irradiated uranium. In 1960s he and his colleagues studied fission with simultaneous emission of protons, tritons and alpha-particles. In 1960s jointly with the colleagues Petrzhak performed a series of precision absolute measurements of induced fission, caused by neutrons, which have monoenergy as well as fission-spectrum neutrons. From 1963 to 1976, he published a series of articles on the measurement of photofission. From 1973 through 1984, he took part in measuring induced fission cross-sections of U-238, U-235 and Pu-239 when irradiated by monoenergy neutrons In 1978, Konstantin Petrzhak co-authored a paper (with Yuri Oganessian and others) about synthesis of hassium performed in Joint Institute for Nuclear Research.

Petrzhak was awarded Doctor of Sciences in 1948 and a professor. He was never elected an academician or the corresponding member of any academy, but Petrzhak was a member of Nuclear Physics Department of Russian Academy of Sciences. Konstantin Petrzhak published articles on fission products from nuclear reactors until his death in 1998. He died on October 10, 1998, and was buried at Serafimovskoe Cemetery in Saint Petersburg.

== Personal life ==
Konstantin Petrzhak studied painting. He created paintings throughout his life. He used his skills in painting when he covered the plates of ionization chamber with uranium which later led to discovery of spontaneous fission. He was also an amateur violin and guitar player. Konstantin Petrzhak married Galina Ivanovna Mitrofanova (b. 1918), also a radiochemist.

== Awards ==
- 1946 Stalin Prize (2nd degree; jointly with Georgy Flyorov for discovery of spontaneous fission; 100000 Soviet rubles each;)
- 1950 Council of Ministers Prize (for work on fulfillment of governmental tasks)
- 1953 Stalin Prize (for work on soviet atomic project)
- 1953 Order of the Red Banner of Labour (for work on soviet atomic project)
- 1957 Presidium of Academy of Sciences of the Soviet Union Prize

== Selected works ==
- Flerov GN, Petrzhak KA (1 July 1940). "Spontaneous fission of uranium". Phys. Rev. 58 (1): 89. Bibcode:1940PhRv...58...89F. doi:10.1103/PhysRev.58.89.2.
- Dushin, V.N.; Fomichev, A.V.; Kovalenko, S.S.; Petrzhak, K.A.; Shpakov, V.I.; Arlt, R.; Josch, M.; Muziol, G.; Ortlepp, H.G.; Wagner W. (1982). "Statistical analysis of the experimental data of fission cross section measurements on ^{233, 235, 238}U, ^{237}Np, ^{239, 242}Pu at neutron energies of 2.5, 8.4 and 14.5 MeV". Proc. of XIIth International symp. on nuclear physics. Gaussig, 1982, ZfK-491. Dresden. p. 138.
- Петржак, К. А.; Флеров, Г. Н. (1940). Спонтанное деление урана [Spontaneous fission of uranium]. ЖЭТФ (in Russian). 10: 10–13.
- Петржак, К. А.; Флеров, Г. Н. (1941). Спонтанное деление урана [Spontaneous fission of uranium]. Успехи Физических Наук (in Russian). 25 (2): 241–249. doi:10.3367/UFNr.0025.194102i.0241.
