= Zinaida Yershova =

Russian chemist (1904–1995)

- Ершова, Зинаида
- Born: Ershova, Zinaida Vasilyevna; Ершова, Зинаида Васильевна; October 23, 1904; Moscow, Russia
- Died: April 25, 1995 (aged 90); Moscow, Russia
- Resting place: Vagankovo Cemetery; 55°46′05″N 37°32′54″E
- Citizenship: Russia
- Education: Moscow State University; Moscow State University of Fine Chemical Technologies
- Known for: Soviet program of nuclear weapons Soviet space program
- Awards: Stalin Prize (1949, 1951, 1954)
- Scientific career
- Fields: Chemistry
- Workplaces: KB-11; Plant No. 12; First Radium Institute
- Doctoral advisor: Vitaly Khlopin

Zinaida Vasilyevna Yershova (Russian: Зинаида Васильевна Ершова; 23 October 1904 — 25 April 1995), D.N., was a Russian chemist who spent her entire career in radioactive applications in the former Soviet program of nuclear weapons, later in the space program.

== Biography ==
Zinaida Yershova was born in Moscow, Russia, on October 23, 1904. After finishing school in 1924, she went onto to attend the Moscow State University to study chemistry. In 1925, she found an employment opportunity at the Radium Institute in Petrograd where she worked under Vitaly Khlopin who later helped her securing a full-time employment at the Moscow Plant of Rare Elements, where radium was first produced in the Soviet Union industrially. In 1929, she graduated with a diploma in chemistry from the Moscow State University and moved to Kirghizstan to work in Tyuya-Muyun deposits in 1931. The first batches of radium were produced with 200 mg (0.20 g), 90% pure.

In 1936, Khlopin was able to find her an internship to the Curie Institute in Paris. Working under Irène Joliot-Curie, she published a paper in 1937 in Journal de Physique: '"Estimation of the ratio uranium-238/uranium-235 in U-Y". On the recommendation of Khlopin, she was sent to work at Institute of Rare Metals and was appointed head of the radium laboratory.

In 1940, Yershova returned to academia to attend the Moscow State University of Fine Chemical Technology where she defended her thesis for the Candidate of Sciences degree based on the Radium research from the Radium Institute in 1945. In 1952, she was qualified for the Doctor of Sciences (D.N.) in chemistry after submitting thesis on the RDS-3T design.

=== Soviet program of nuclear weapons ===
On the recommendation of her mentor Vitaly Khlopin, she was sent to work at State Institute of Rare Metals and was appointed head of the radium laboratory but this was short-lived since she was evacuated to Kazakhstan with her family when Germany invaded the Soviet Union in 1941.

In 1943, she was called back to Moscow by Igor Kurchatov, who was brought by Soviet authorities to accelerate the Soviet program of nuclear weapons, and asked her to produce uranium carbide and uranium metal. In 1945, she headed works at a Plant No. 12 in Elektrostal to manufacture the uranium ingots but later pushed for greater autonomy which initially irked Khlopin. Eventually, the Soviet State Defense Committee did create the Institute of Special Materials (later NII-9, the A. Bochvar All-Russian Research Institute of Inorganic Materials or VNIINM), that overtook the research work from the German nuclear physicists working in the Soviet program of nuclear weapons. On the question of producing the uranium metal, Lavrentiy Beria, the program lead, seek advice from Yershova and other Russian scientists if Soviet Union is able to produce the fissile material without the German assistance.

In 1946, Yershova was made head of the first radiochemical laboratory at NII-9 in Sukhumi and oversaw the developing technology to process uranium and its nuclear product after irradiation - plutonium (and its products, for nuclear bomb material and research) - and bismuth and its nuclear product after irradiation - polonium (to be a nuclear bomb primer with a high density of neutrons). In 1947, the Russian F-1 reactor was able to produce the ingots of irradiated uranium which was extracted into the plutonium from the pilot factory, the Mayak. In December 1947, the Yershova was part of the small team that was able produced the first Soviet plutonium– a mass of 73 mg (0.073 g).

In 1948, Yershova switched to polonium research when the technique was developed by Yershova and D.M. Ziva (dissolving irradiated bismuth ingots in nitric acid followed by deposition on copper or bismuth powder followed by sublimation in a vacuum) to produce large quantities of polonium-beryllium neutron sources in another new factory. The first Soviet nuclear discharge, the RDS-1, was tested in August 1949, using these products. For her contribution, she was awarded the first of her national prizes, the Stalin Prize, the same year. After 1949, she was instructed to produce tritium from the irradiation of lithium to use in the development of the Soviet hydrogen bomb. In 1952, Yershova gained her Ph.D. from the institute.

In the 1960s, the main area of work for Yershova was tritium production for research on the tritium fuel cycle for reactors and "installations" (the latter such as KB-11 in the closed city of Sarov). Polonium was used less by nuclear weapons designers but continued to be used for small-scale atomic energy sources. With B.V. Petrov she developed a 'dry' process, vacuum distillation of polonium from irradiated melted bismuth, which was safer and more efficient. Yershova studied the reactions of polonium with many different elements. Her laboratories produced polonium products for electric current generators in communications satellites (Kosmos-84 and Kosmos-90 in 1965) and three thermal blocks (in 1968, 1970 and 1972) for the moon rovers Lunokhod-1 and Lunokhod-2. She was awarded the V.G. Khlopin USSR Academy of Sciences Prize in 1968 for her work on the chemistry of polonium.

She retired from NII-9 after a 40-year career. She died in 1995 and is buried at the Vagankovo Cemetery in Moscow.

== Awards ==
- 1949, 1951, 1954: Stalin Prize
- 1968: V.G. Khlopin USSR Academy of Sciences Prize
