= Joseph Starik =

Soviet radiochemist

- Иосиф Евсеевич Старик
- Born: 23 March 1902; Saratov, Russian Empire
- Died: 27 March 1964 (aged 62); Leningrad, Russian SFSR, Soviet Union
- Resting place: Serafimovskoe Cemetery
- Citizenship: Soviet Union
- Education: Moscow State University
- Scientific career
- Fields: Physics
- Doctoral advisor: Vitaly Khlopin

Joseph Yevseyevich Starik (Russian: Иосиф Евсеевич Старик; 23 March 1902, Saratov – 27 March 1964, Leningrad) was a Soviet radiochemist, a representative of the Russian radiochemical school, a close associate and a friend of Vitaly Khlopin, for the first time began systematic studies of ionic and colloidal forms of the state of radionuclides in ultra-diluted solutions. Corresponding member of the Academy of Sciences of the Soviet Union (1946), recipient of three Stalin Prizes (1949, 1951, 1953).

== Biography ==
In 1924, he graduated from the Department of Chemistry, Faculty of Physics and Mathematics of Moscow University. He worked at the V. G. Khlopin Radium Institute in Leningrad, taught at Leningrad State University (now Saint Petersburg State University). Participant in the nuclear weapons test at the Semipalatinsk Test Site.

The author of the pioneering fundamental work "Fundamentals of Radiochemistry," which summarized all modern ideas about physics, physico-chemistry of sorption processes, methods for determining the forms of the state of radionuclides in extremely dilute state in solutions, gases and solids, the author of works on radioanalytical methods for determining the age of rocks, chemistry of nuclear reactors, chemistry of plutonium.

== Scientific papers ==
- Old I. E. On the question of the colloidal properties of polonium// Proceedings of the State Radium Institute. Leningrad. NHTI, 1930, vol. 1, pp. 29–75; 1933, vol.2, pp. 91–103;
- Starik I. E. Radioactive methods for determining geological time. Leningrad — Moscow. Chief Editor. chemical lit. 1938. 176 p.
- Old I. E. Fundamentals of radiochemistry. Moscow — Leningrad. USSR Academy of Sciences.1959. 460 p.; 2nd ed. Moscow — Leningrad. Science. 1969. 647 p.; translations into English, German. and Japanese. languages, published in the USA under the inaccurate title: Starik I.E. Principles of readiochemistry. LLNL.1985. Monthly Catalog of United States Government Publications, entry No.8050).
- Starik I. E. Nuclear geochronology. Moscow — Leningrad, USSR Academy of Sciences, 1961. 630s.

== Awards and honours ==
- Three Orders of Lenin (29 October 1949; 1951; 1953)
- Two Orders of the Red Banner of Labour (10 June 1945; 21 March 1947)
- Order of the Badge of Honour (1962)
- Three Stalin Prizes (1949, 2nd class – for leading the development of the technological process of chemical separation of plutonium at the plant No. 817; 1951; 1953)
- V. G. Khlopin Prize, for the monograph "Fundamentals of Radiochemistry", 1959
