= Igor Kurchatov =

Soviet nuclear physicist (1903–1960)

- Игорь Курчатов
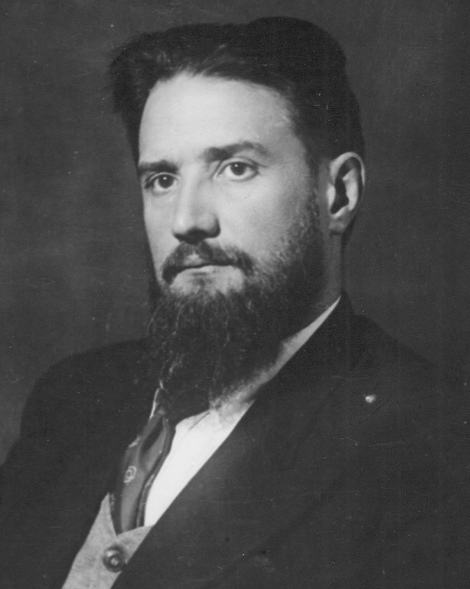
- Kurchatov in 1948
- Born: Igor Vasilyevich Kurchatov; 12 January 1903; Simsky Zavod, Russia
- Died: 7 February 1960 (aged 57); Moscow, Russian SFSR, Soviet Union
- Resting place: Kremlin Wall Necropolis
- Education: Leningrad Polytechnical Institute
- Known for: Soviet atomic bomb project
- Awards: Lenin Prize; Stalin Prize; Hero of Socialist Labour
- Scientific career
- Fields: Physics
- Workplaces: Arzamas-16; Ioffel Physico-Technical Institute; Azerbaijan Polytechnic Institute
- Website: I.V. Kurchatov by PBS

Igor Vasilyevich Kurchatov (Russian: Игорь Васильевич Курчатов; 12 January 1903 [O.S. 30 December 1902] – 7 February 1960) was a Soviet physicist who played a central role directing Laboratory No. 2, the research institute of the Soviet nuclear weapons program. He has been called the "father of the Russian atomic bomb".

Kurchatov graduated Leningrad Polytechnic Institute as a naval architect. As many of his contemporaries in Russia, he was an autodidact in nuclear physics and was brought by Soviet establishment to accelerate the feasibility of the "super bomb". Aided by Soviet nuclear espionage on the US Manhattan Project, Kurchatov oversaw the development and testing of the first Soviet research reactor, F-1, plutonium production reactor, A-1, and nuclear weapon, RDS-1, the latter at Semipalatinsk in the Kazakh SSR in 1949, and roughly based on the US Fat Man bomb.

Kurchatov, a recipient of many former Soviet honors, had an instrumental role in modern nuclear industry in Russia. His rapid decline in health is mainly attributed to a 1949 radiation accident in Chelyabinsk-40. Kurchatov died in Moscow in 1960, aged 57.

== Biography ==
Kurchatov was born in Simsky Zavod in Ufa Governorate, Russia, on 12 January 1903. His father, Vasily Alekseyevich Kurchatov, was a surveyor and former forester's assistant in the Ural Mountains; his mother, Mariya Vasilyevna Ostroumova, a daughter of the parish priest at Sim, was a school teacher. He was the second of three children of Vasily Kurchatov, and the family moved to Simferopol in Crimea in 1912. The Kurchatovs were of Russian ethnicity.

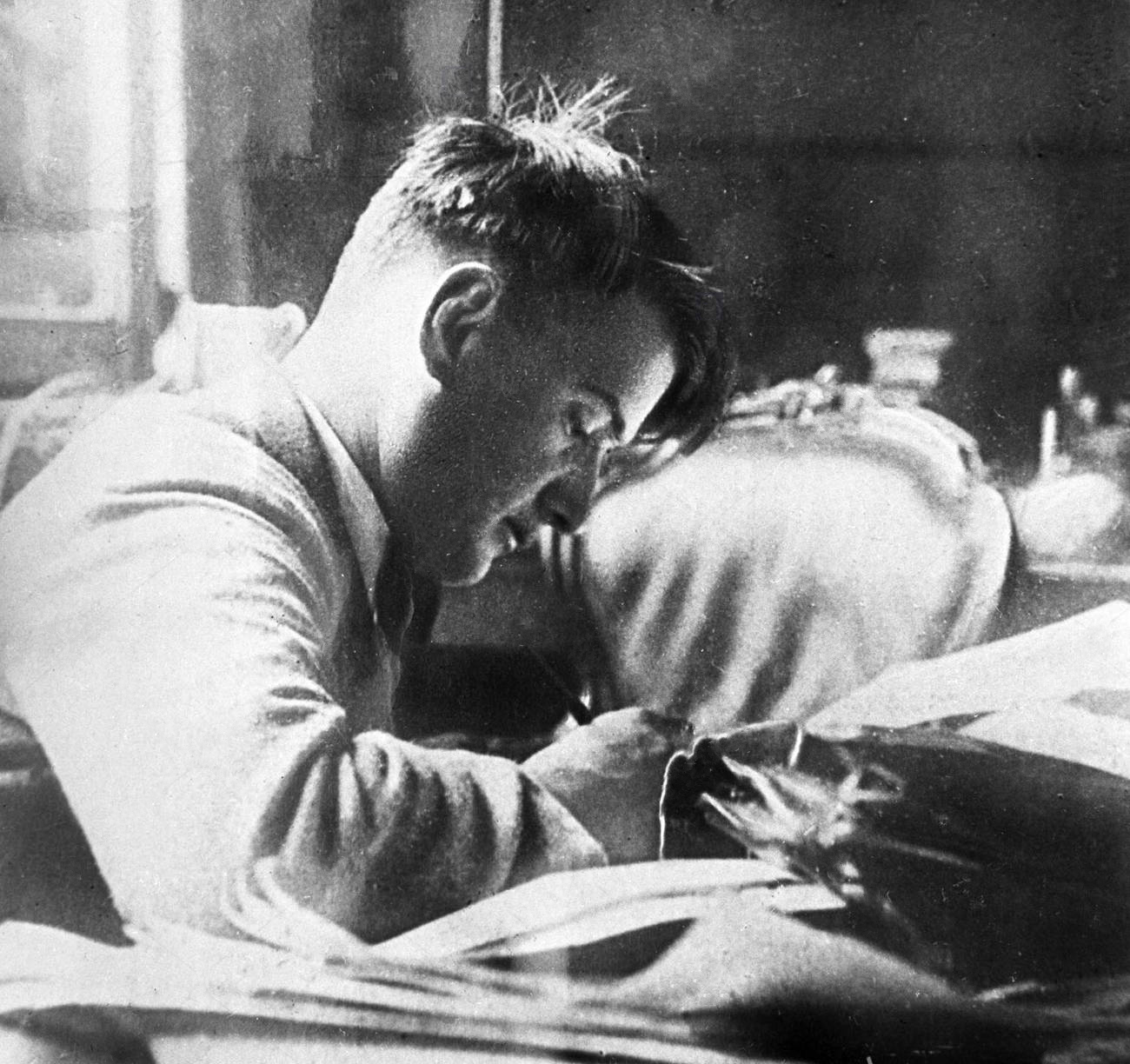
Igor Kurchatov in Leningrad, 1929

After his older sister, Antonina, died in Crimea, Igor grew up with his younger brother, Boris, where they both attended the Simferopol gymnasium №1, and was a Mandolin player at his school's orchestra. During World War I, Igor and Boris had to work to support the family, becoming a skilled welder and developing interests in steam engines, wishing to become an engineer.

Kurchatov attended the Crimea State University where he studied physics and had built a reputation for his mechanical ability to perform physics experiments, for which he was titled as a doctorate. Kurchatov soon moved to Baku in Azerbaijan after securing physics assistance job at the Azerbaijan Polytechnic Institute. There, he presented his experiments in electrical conduction, which impressed Dr. Abram Ioffe who was there as a guest, and invited him to Physico-Technical Institute in Saint Petersburg, Russia. Kurchatov married Marina Sinelnikova in 1927 and they did not have children.

While working under Ioffe on ferroelectricity and semiconductors, Kurchatov entered in Leningrad Polytechnic Institute to study engineering and secured his engineer's degree in naval architecture in 1930s. Between 1931 and 1934, Kurchatov worked in the Radium Institute which was headed by Vitaly Khlopin. In 1937, Kurchatov was a part of the team that designed and built the first cyclotron particle accelerator in Russia, which was installed in Radium Institute. Installation was finished in 1937, and research began to take place on 21 September 1939. During this time, Kurchatov considered studying physics abroad at the Lawrence Berkeley National Laboratory in the United States but the plan fell apart due to political reasons. Until 1933, Kurchatov did not go into the nuclear physics and his work was primarily focused on electromagnetism but did an important work on nuclear isomer and radioactivity in 1935.

In 1940, Kurchatov moved to Kazan and raised objection on spontaneous fission when Georgy Flyorov directed a letter about the discovery. In 1942–43, Kurchatov found a project with the Soviet Navy and moved to Murmansk where he worked with fellow physicist Anatoly Alexandrov. By November 1941, they had devised a method of demagnetising ships to protect them from German mines, which was in active use until the end of World War II and thereafter. The job with Soviet Navy solved Kurchatov's objection on spontaneous fission when he wrote in 1944: "Uranium must be separated into two parts at the moment of detonation. Upon the breaking up of the nuclei in a kilogram of uranium, the energy released must be equal to the explosion of 20,000 tons of TNT equivalent."

== Soviet programme of nuclear weapons ==
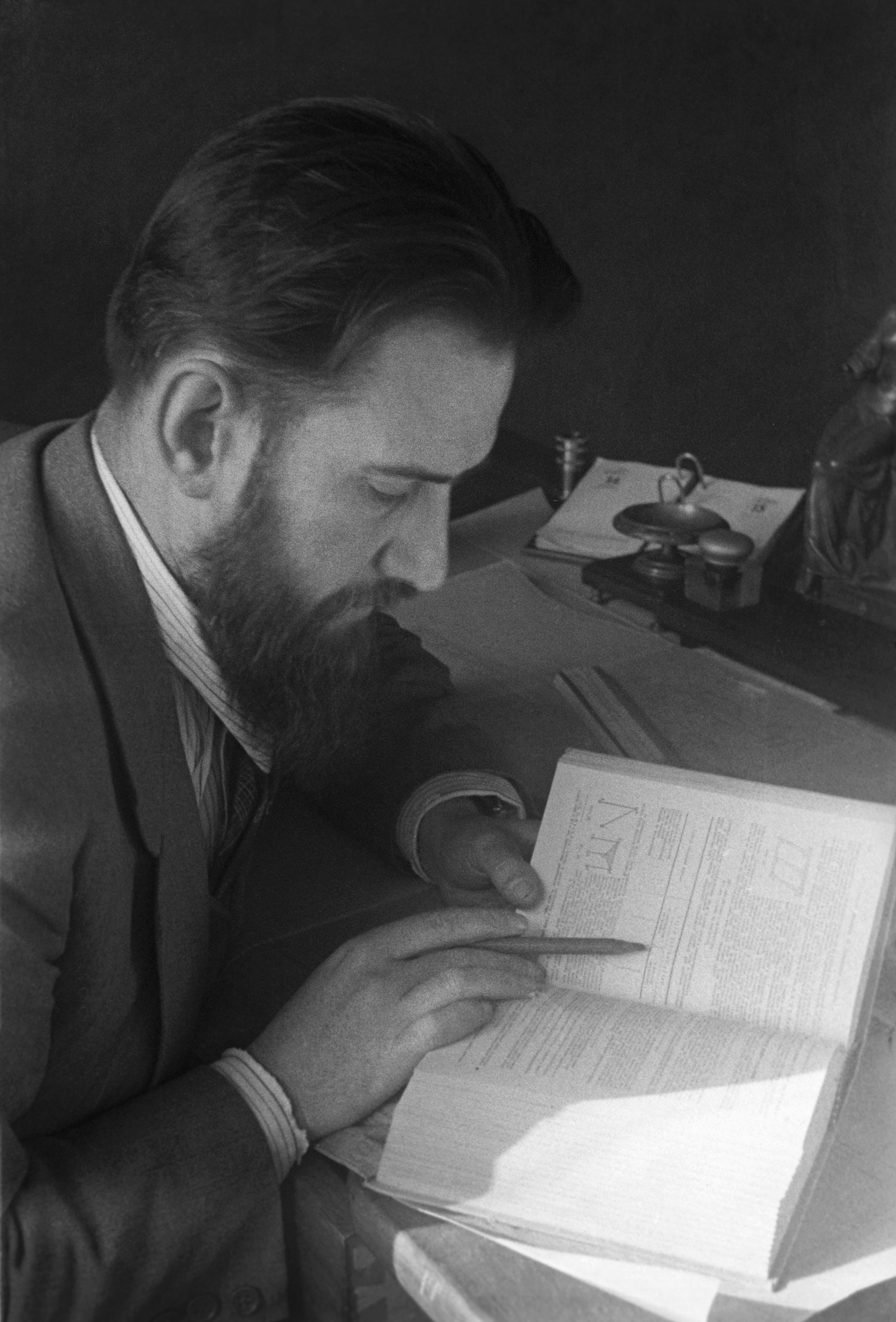
Kurchatov. October 1943

After 1942, Kurchatov oversaw the facility expansion and overall development of the Russian programme in the Soviet Union, from military to civilian dimensions of the nuclear programme. Kurchatov is widely known as father of the Soviet program of nuclear weapons, and is often compared to American Robert Oppenheimer— although Kurchatov was not a theoretical physicist.

The Soviet establishment did not start the programme until 1943 despite receiving intelligence from Russian spies in the United States and a warning from Georgii Flerov. Kurchatov, as many others, was working towards building ammunition for the Red Army's campaign against the German forces at the Eastern Front of World War II. Initially, the Soviet establishment asked Abram Ioffe to lead the Soviet programme of nuclear weapons, which Ioffe rejected, instead recommending Kurchatov in 1942. Kurchatov established the Laboratory No. 2 in Moscow by bringing Abram Alikhanov (who worked on heavy water production) from Armenia and Lev Artsimovich who was instrumental in electromagnetic isotope separation. Initially, Kurchatov insisted working without foreign data on isotope separation and was aiming to produce material using the gas centrifuges but the gas centrifuge machine would be available to the Soviets only much later. Facing a tighter deadline from Stalin, Kurchatov relied upon foreign data by choosing the Gaseous diffusion method to produce the fissile material, a move that irked Pyotr Kapitsa who raised objections against this but was dismissed.

During the early years, the Soviet programme suffered from many setbacks due to logistical failures and lack of commitment by the Soviet establishment but received later full support - after the atomic bombings of Hiroshima and Nagasaki in Japan. In 1942, Kurchatov was informed of results obtained from Chicago Pile-1 by the Soviet intelligence, and provided his view of making a nuclear bomb. In 1945, Kurchatov became involved in designing and building the first reactor at Laboratory No. 2 which sustained the nuclear chain reaction in late 1946. Together with Alikhanov and Flerov, Kurchatov authored a paper on the production of plutonium in a uranium graphite reactor. In 1947, Kurchatov worked with Isaak Kikoin to verify the calculations of the foreign data received on the American programme.

In 1946, the Soviet programme was aggressively pursued under Lavrentiy Beria, who (like Kapitsa) had a conflict with Kurchatov over his reliance on design data provided by Klaus Fuchs, a German physicist in the American Manhattan Project, to meet Stalin's deadline. The design of the first Soviet nuclear device town of Sarov in the Gorki Oblast (now Nizhny Novgorod Oblast), on the Volga, was started and renamed Arzamas-16. Kurchatov recruited Yulii Khariton (who first resisted but joined the programme) and Yakov Zel'dovich, and Kurchatov vigorously defended their deuterium calculations, insisting that the data could not be more accurate on cross section estimates.

The team was assisted by public disclosures made by the US government as well as by further information supplied by Fuchs. However, Kurchatov and Beria feared that the intelligence was disinformation and so insisted that their scientists retest everything themselves. Beria, in particular, would use the intelligence as a third-party check on the conclusions of the teams of scientists.

=== RDS-1 ===
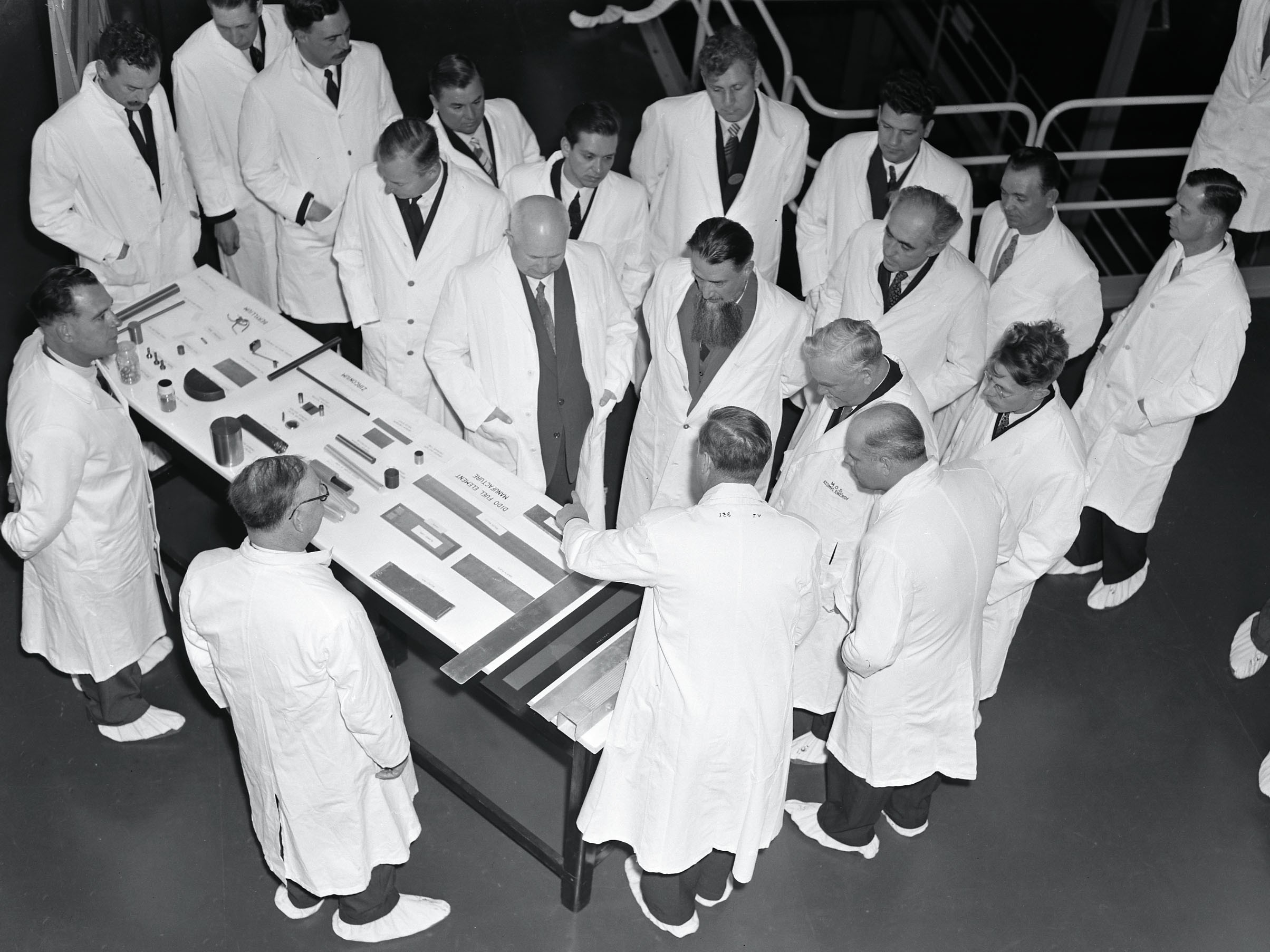
Kurchatov at Harwell on 26 April 1956

The Russian spies in the United States greatly aided in providing the key data on American nuclear devices, which allowed Kurchatov to avoid time-consuming and expensive trial and error problems. The fissile material was obtained from using the gaseous diffusion and implosion-type plutonium core that Kurchatov spent most of his time on. Furthermore, the German nuclear physicists were instrumental in speeding the acquisition of device data, and were employed under Kurchatov's guidance.

Final device assembly was overseen by Yulii Khariton who had a device moved to a knock-down subassembly in Semipalatinsk in Kazakhstan.

On 29 August 1949, Kurchatov and his team successfully detonated its initial test device RDS-1 (a plutonium implosion bomb) at the Semipalatinsk Test Site– the device was codenamed RDS-1 (РДС–1) by Kurchatov which was approved by Soviet establishment. Kurchatov later remarked that his main feeling at the time to be one of relief.

In 1950, the work on thermonuclear weapon was started by Khariton, Sakharov, Zel'dovich, Tamm, and others working under Kurchatov's leadership at Arzamas-16. Kurchatov aided in calculations but most work was done by Vitaly Ginzburg, Andrei Sakharov, Khariton, and Zel'dovich who had the most credit in developing the design for the thermonuclear device, known as RDS-6, which was detonated in 1953.

By the time RDS-1 exploded, Kurchatov had decided to work on nuclear power generation, working closely with engineer Nikolay Dollezhal, which would established the Obninsk Nuclear Power Plant, near Moscow. The site was opened in 1954, which was known for its kind and was the first nuclear power plant in the world. His knowledge on naval architecture undoubtedly helped him in designing the first civilian nuclear ship, the Lenin.

After Stalin's death and the execution of Beria, Kurchatov began to speak about the dangers of nuclear war, of nuclear weapon testing and visited England where he spoke in favour of greater interaction between Russian and Western scientists on nuclear fusion applications.

== Death ==
In January 1949, Kurchatov was involved in a serious radiation accident which became a catastrophe at Chelyabinsk-40, in which it is possible that even more people died than at Chernobyl. In an effort to save the uranium load and reduce losses in the production of plutonium, Kurchatov, without proper safety gear, was the first to step into the central hall of the damaged reactor full of radioactive gases. After 1950, Kurchatov's health sharply declined. He suffered a stroke in 1954, and died in Moscow of a cardiac embolism on 7 February 1960, aged 57. He was cremated, and his ashes were buried in the Kremlin Wall Necropolis on Red Square.

== Legacy and honours ==
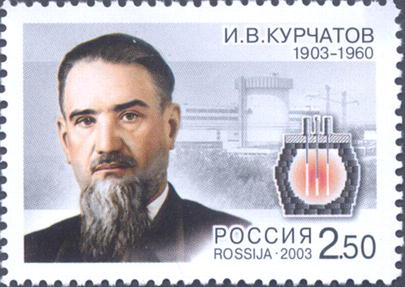
Kurchatov on a 2003 stamp of Russia.

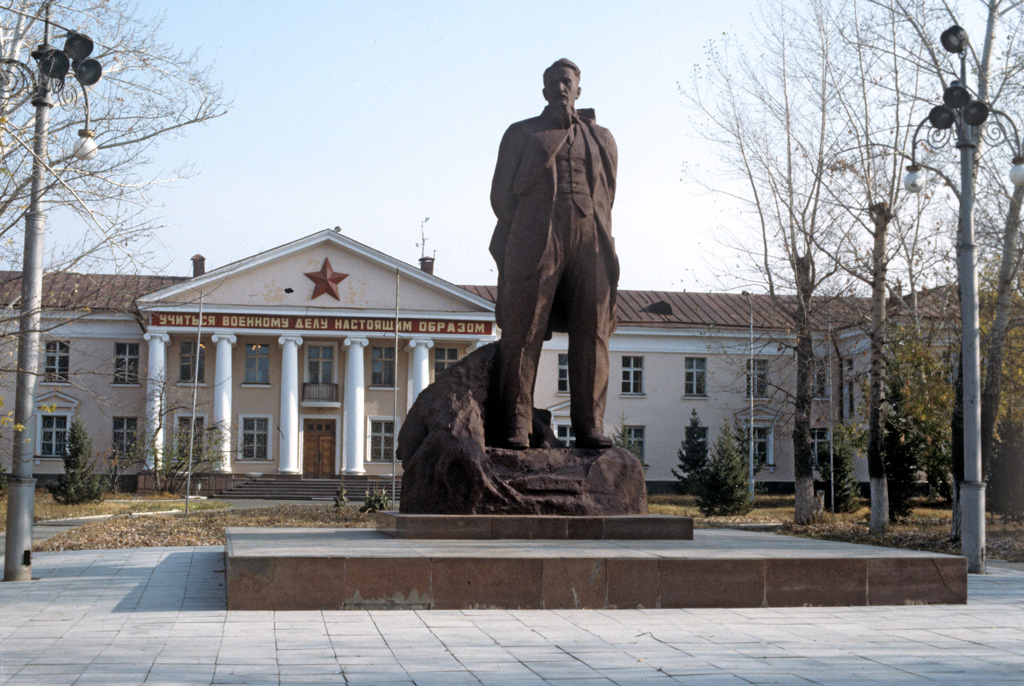
Monument to Kurchatov at the Semipalatinsk nuclear test site's Central Staff office, 1991.

During his time in Soviet nuclear programme, Kurchatov swore he would not cut his beard until the Soviet programme succeeded, and he continued to wear a large beard (often cut into eccentric styles) for the remainder of his life, earning him the nickname "The Beard". Kurchatov was a communist who had a portrait of Stalin by the time he died, and a member of Communist Party of the Soviet Union.

Two towns bear his name: Kurchatov Township in Kazakhstan, and Kurchatov near Kursk (the site of a nuclear power station), the Kurchatov Institute is named in his honour, and bears a large monument dedicated to him at the entrance. The crater Kurchatov on the Moon and the asteroid 2352 Kurchatov are also named after him. Many of his students also enjoyed distinguished careers, among them Andrei Sakharov, Viktor Adamsky, Yuri Babayev, Yuri Trutnev and Yuri Smirnov.

For his part in establishing the Soviet nuclear programme, in accordance with state decree 627-258, Kurchatov was awarded the title of Hero of Socialist Labor, the Stalin Prize First Class, the sum of 500,000 rubles (besides the earlier results of (50%) premium in the amount of 500,000 rubles) and a ZIS-110 car, a private house and cottage furnished by the state, a doubling of his salary and "the right (for life for him and his wife) to free travel by rail, water and air transport in the USSR". In all, he was:

- Member of the Soviet Academy of Sciences (elected in 1943)
- Three times Hero of Socialist Labor (1949, 1951, 1954)
- Awarded five Orders of Lenin
- Awarded two Orders of the Red Banner
- Awarded the following medals: "For Victory over Germany", "For the defense of Sevastopol"
- Four times recipient of the Stalin Prize (1942, 1949, 1951, 1954)
- Recipient of the Lenin Prize (1957).

Kurchatov was buried in the Kremlin Wall in Moscow, a burial place reserved for top Soviet officials. In 1960 his institute was renamed to the I.V. Kurchatov Institute of Atomic Energy, and in 1991 to the Russian Research Centre Kurchatov Institute. The Kurchatov Medal was established by the Academy of Sciences for outstanding work in nuclear physics. In the Transfermium Wars element naming controversy, the USSR's proposed name for element 104 was "kurchatovium", Ku, in honor of Kurchatov. Element 104 is now known as rutherfordium.
