= Yuri A. Barbanel =

Russian chemist

Yuri Barbanel
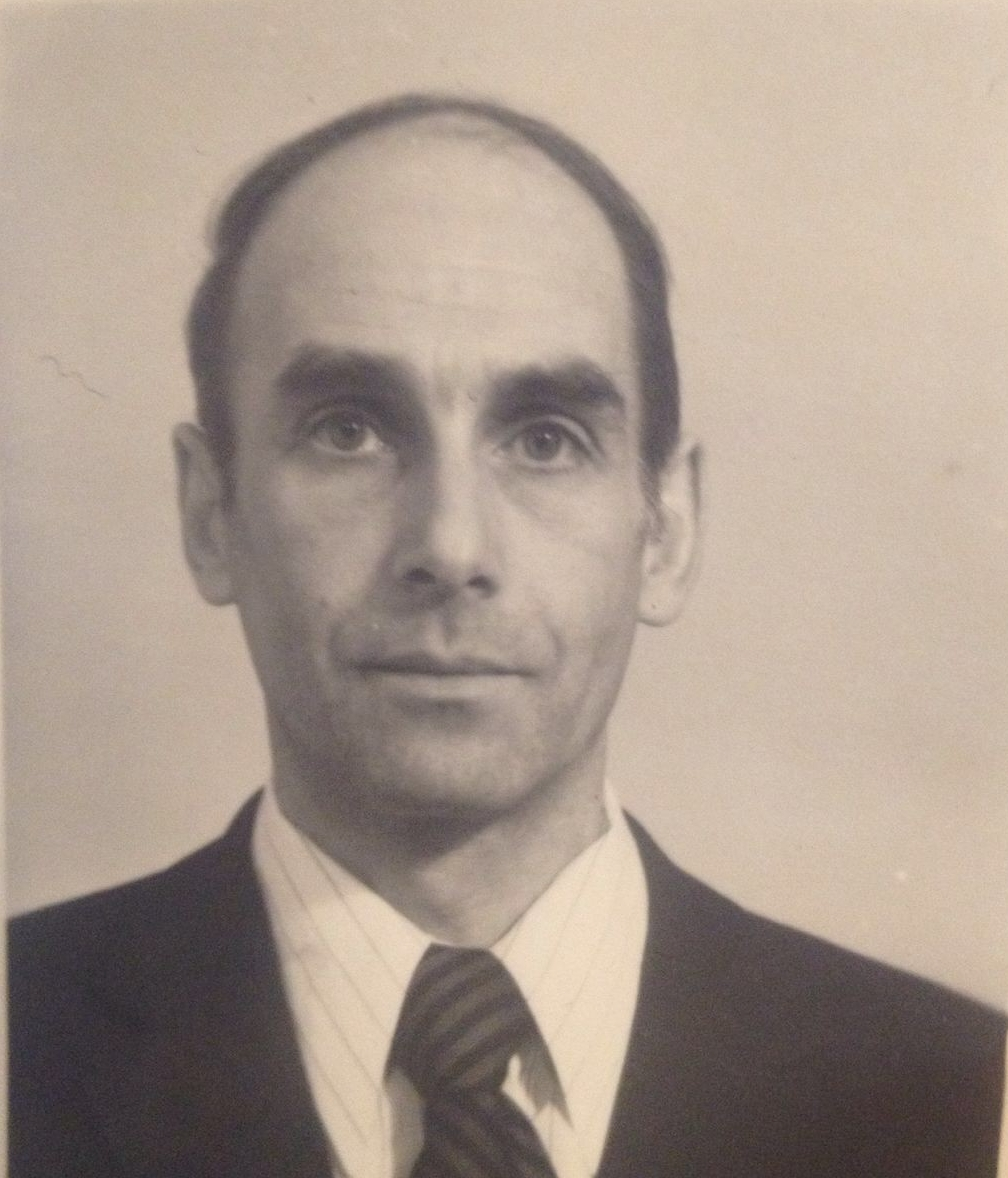
- Born: Yuri Abramovich Barbanel; 8 April 1935; Leningrad, USSR
- Died: 2 August 2016 (aged 81); Saint-Petersburg, Russia
- Citizenship: Soviet Union, Russia
- Education: Leningrad State University
- Scientific career
- Fields: Physical Chemistry
- Workplaces: V. G. Khlopin Radium Institute

Yuri A. Barbanel (also Yuri A. Barbanel’, Yury Abramovich Barbanel) (8 April 1935 – 2 August 2016) was a distinguished Russian chemist born in 1935 in Leningrad (now St. Petersburg). He obtained a Master of Science in chemistry from A. A. Zhdanov Leningrad State University, now Saint Petersburg State University, in 1958 and his Ph.D. in 1964 and his D.Sc. in 1991. Barbanel was a scientist in the fundamental radiochemistry branch of the V. G. Khlopin Radium Institute in St. Petersburg until his retirement in 2011. His research interests included optical spectra induced by radioluminescence and coordination chemistry of the actinides, and absorption spectra of the actinides in molten salts.
