= Cyclotron =

Type of particle accelerator

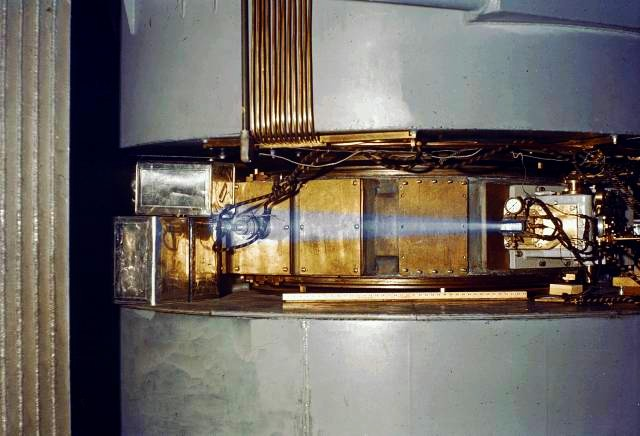
Lawrence's 60-inch (152 cm) cyclotron, c. 1939, showing the beam of accelerated ions (likely protons or deuterons) exiting the machine and ionizing the surrounding air causing a blue glow

A cyclotron is a type of particle accelerator invented by Ernest Lawrence in 1929–1930 at the University of California, Berkeley, and patented in 1932. A cyclotron accelerates charged particles outwards from the center of a flat cylindrical vacuum chamber along a spiral path. The particles are held to a spiral trajectory by a static magnetic field and accelerated by a rapidly varying electric field. Lawrence was awarded the 1939 Nobel Prize in Physics for this invention.

The cyclotron was the first "cyclical" accelerator. The primary accelerators before the development of the cyclotron were electrostatic accelerators, such as the Cockcroft–Walton generator and the Van de Graaff generator. In these accelerators, particles would cross an accelerating electric field only once. Thus, the energy gained by the particles was limited by the maximum electrical potential that could be achieved across the accelerating region. This potential was in turn limited by electrostatic breakdown to a few million volts. In a cyclotron, by contrast, the particles encounter the accelerating region many times by following a spiral path, so the output energy can be many times the energy gained in a single accelerating step.

Cyclotrons were the most powerful particle accelerator technology until the 1950s, when they were surpassed by the synchrotron. Nonetheless, they are still widely used to produce particle beams for nuclear medicine and basic research. As of 2020, close to 1,500 cyclotrons were in use worldwide for the production of radionuclides for nuclear medicine and ultimately, for the production of radiopharmaceuticals. In addition, cyclotrons can be used for particle therapy, where particle beams are directly applied to patients.

== History ==
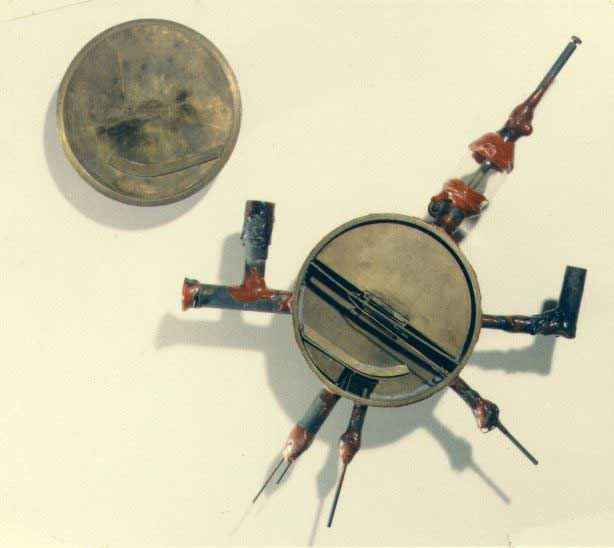
Lawrence's original 4.5-inch (11 cm) cyclotron

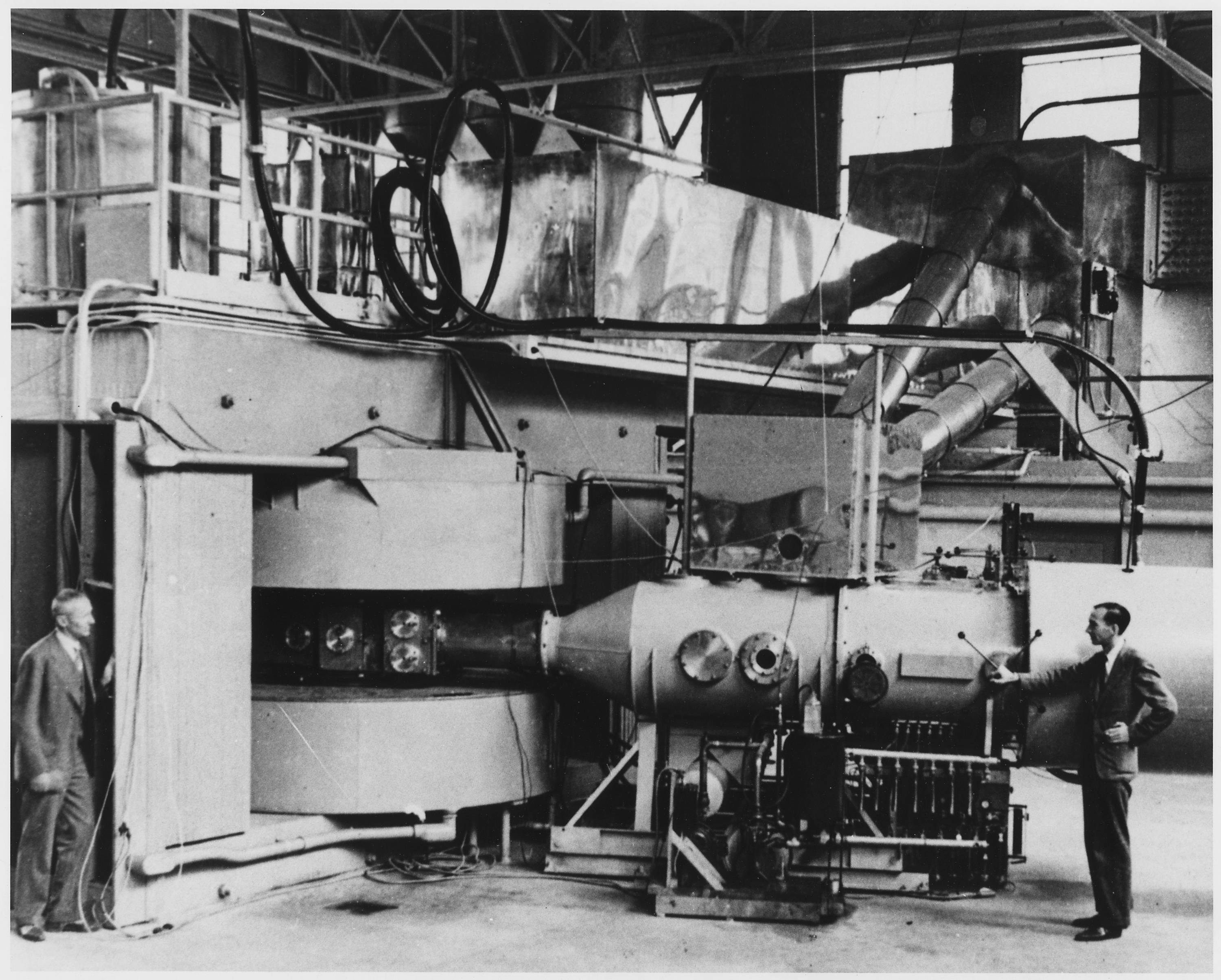
Lawrence's 60-inch (150 cm) cyclotron at Lawrence Radiation Laboratory, University of California, Berkeley, California, constructed in 1939. The magnet is on the left, with the vacuum chamber between its pole pieces, and the beamline which analyzed the particles is on the right.

=== Origins ===
A key limitation of the earliest charged particle accelerators was that increasing the particle energy required extending the length of the acceleration path, which was only feasible and practical up to a certain point. In 1927, while a student at Kiel, German physicist Max Steenbeck was the first to formulate the concept of the cyclotron, but he was discouraged from pursuing the idea further. In late 1928 and early 1929, Hungarian physicist Leo Szilárd filed patent applications in Germany for the linear accelerator, cyclotron, and betatron. In these applications, Szilárd became the first person to discuss the resonance condition for a circular accelerating apparatus. However, neither Steenbeck's ideas nor Szilard's patent applications were ever published and therefore did not contribute to the development of the cyclotron.

Several months later, in the early summer of 1929, Ernest Lawrence independently conceived the cyclotron concept after reading a paper by Rolf Widerøe describing a drift tube accelerator. He published a paper in Science in 1930 (the first published description of the cyclotron concept), after a student of his built a crude model in April of that year. He patented the device in 1932.

To construct the first such device, Lawrence used large electromagnets recycled from obsolete arc converters provided by the Federal Telegraph Company. He was assisted by a graduate student, M. Stanley Livingston. Their first working cyclotron became operational on January 2, 1931. This machine had a diameter of 4.5 inches (11 cm), and accelerated protons to an energy up to 80 keV.

At the Radiation Laboratory on the campus of the University of California, Berkeley (now the Lawrence Berkeley National Laboratory), Lawrence and his collaborators went on to construct a series of cyclotrons which were the most powerful accelerators in the world at the time; a 27 in (69 cm) 4.8 MeV machine (1932), a 37 in (94 cm) 8 MeV machine (1937), and a 60 in (152 cm) 16 MeV machine (1939). Lawrence received the 1939 Nobel Prize in Physics for the invention and development of the cyclotron and for results obtained with it.

The first European cyclotron was constructed in 1934 in the Soviet Union by Mikhail Alekseevich Eremeev, at the Leningrad Physico-Technical Institute. It was a small design based on a prototype by Lawrence, with a 28 cm diameter capable of achieving 530 keV proton energies. Research quickly refocused around the construction of a larger MeV-level cyclotron, in the physics department of the V.G. Khlopin Radium Institute in Leningrad, headed by Vitaly Khlopin. This instrument was first proposed in 1932 by George Gamow and Lev Mysovskii and was installed and became operative in March 1937 at 100 cm (39 in) diameter and 3.2 MeV proton energies.

The first Asian cyclotron was constructed at the Riken laboratory in Tokyo, by a team including Yoshio Nishina, Sukeo Watanabe, Tameichi Yasaki, and Ryokichi Sagane. Yasaki and Sagane had been sent to Berkeley Radiation Laboratory to work with Lawrence. The device had a 26 in diameter and the first beam was produced on April 2, 1937, at 2.9 MeV deuteron energies.

=== During World War II ===
Cyclotrons played a key role in the Manhattan Project. The published 1940 discovery of neptunium and the withheld 1941 discovery of plutonium both used bombardment in the Berkeley Radiation Laboratory's 60-inch cyclotron. Furthermore Lawrence invented the calutron (California University cyclotron), (Note: Note that although the name "calutron" is derived from that of the cyclotron, calutrons are not themselves cyclotrons, as the beam crosses the accelerating gap only once.) which was industrially developed at the Y-12 National Security Complex from 1942. This provided the bulk of the uranium enrichment process, taking low-enriched uranium (<5% uranium-235) from the S-50 and K-25 plants and electromagnetically separating isotopes up to 84.5% highly enriched uranium (HEU). This was the first production of HEU in history, and was shipped to Los Alamos and used in the Little Boy bomb dropped on Hiroshima, and its precursor Water Boiler and Dragon test reactors.

In France, Frédéric Joliot-Curie constructed a large 7 MeV cyclotron at the Collège de France in Paris, achieving the first beam in March 1939. With the Nazi occupation of Paris in June 1940 and an incoming contingent of German scientists, Joliot ceased research into uranium fission, and obtained an understanding with his German former colleague Wolfgang Gentner that no research of military use would be carried out. In 1943 Gentner was recalled for weakness, and a new German contingent attempted to operate the cyclotron. However, it is likely that Joliot, a member of French Communist Party and in fact president of the National Front resistance movement, sabotaged the cyclotron to prevent its use to the Nazi German nuclear program.

In Nazi Germany, one cyclotron was built in Heidelberg, under the supervision of Walther Bothe and Wolfgang Gentner, with support from the Heereswaffenamt. At the end of 1938, Gentner was sent to Berkeley Radiation Laboratory and worked most closely with Emilio Segrè and Donald Cooksey, returning before the start of the war. Construction was slowed by the war and completed in January 1944, but difficulties in testing made it unusable until the war's end.

In Japan, the large Riken cyclotron was used to bombard uranium processed in their Clusius tube gaseous diffusion device. The experiment indicated that no enrichment of the uranium-235 content had occurred. Following the occupation of Japan, American forces, fearing continuation of the Japanese nuclear weapons program, disassembled the Riken laboratory's cyclotron and dumped it in Tokyo Bay. During the disassembly, Yoshio Nishina begged otherwise, saying "This is ten years of my life ... It has nothing to do with bombs." Secretary of War Robert P. Patterson later admitted the decision was a mistake.

=== Post-war ===
By the late 1930s it had become clear that there was a practical limit on the beam energy that could be achieved with the traditional cyclotron design, due to the effects of special relativity. As particles reach relativistic speeds, their effective mass increases, which causes the resonant frequency for a given magnetic field to change. To address this issue and reach higher beam energies using cyclotrons, two primary approaches were taken, synchrocyclotrons (which hold the magnetic field constant, but decrease the accelerating frequency) and isochronous cyclotrons (which hold the accelerating frequency constant, but alter the magnetic field).

Lawrence's team built one of the first synchrocyclotrons in 1946. This 184 in (4.7 m) machine eventually achieved a maximum beam energy of 350 MeV for protons. However, synchrocyclotrons suffer from low beam intensities (< 1 μA), and must be operated in a "pulsed" mode, further decreasing the available total beam. As such, they were quickly overtaken in popularity by isochronous cyclotrons.

The first isochronous cyclotron (other than classified prototypes) was built by F. Heyn and K.T. Khoe in Delft, the Netherlands, in 1956. Early isochronous cyclotrons were limited to energies of ~50 MeV per nucleon, but as manufacturing and design techniques gradually improved, the construction of "spiral-sector" cyclotrons allowed the acceleration and control of more powerful beams. Later developments included the use of more compact and power-efficient superconducting magnets and the separation of the magnets into discrete sectors, as opposed to a single large magnet.

== Principle of operation ==
A cyclotron is essentially a linear particle accelerator wrapped in a circle. A uniform magnetic field perpendicular to the plane of particle motion causes the particles to orbit. During each orbit the particles are accelerated by electric fields.

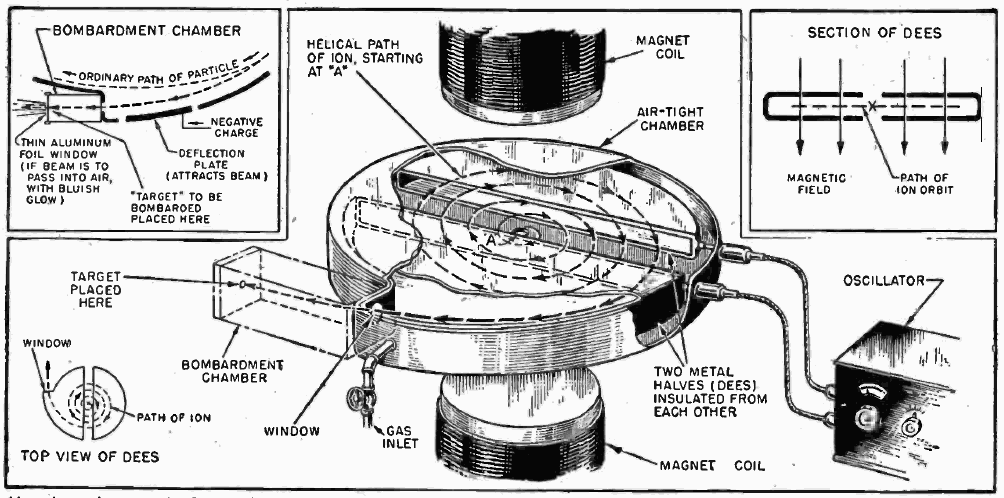
Diagram of a cyclotron. The magnet's pole pieces are shown smaller than in reality; they must actually be at least as wide as the accelerating electrodes ("dees") to create a uniform field.

=== Cyclotron principle ===
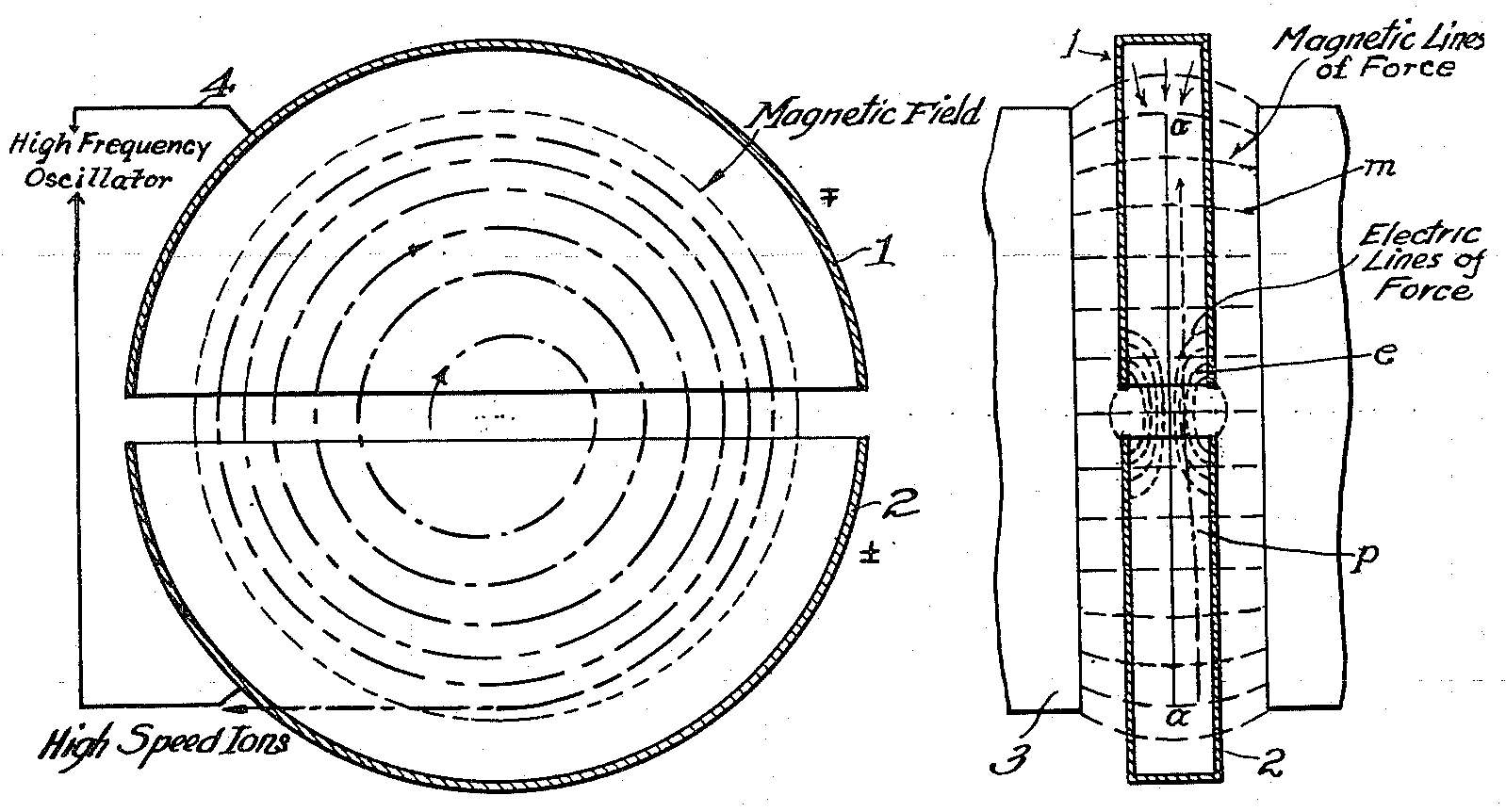
Diagram of cyclotron operation from Lawrence's 1934 patent. The hollow, open-faced D-shaped electrodes (left), known as dees, are enclosed in a flat vacuum chamber which is installed in a narrow gap between the two poles of a large magnet (right).

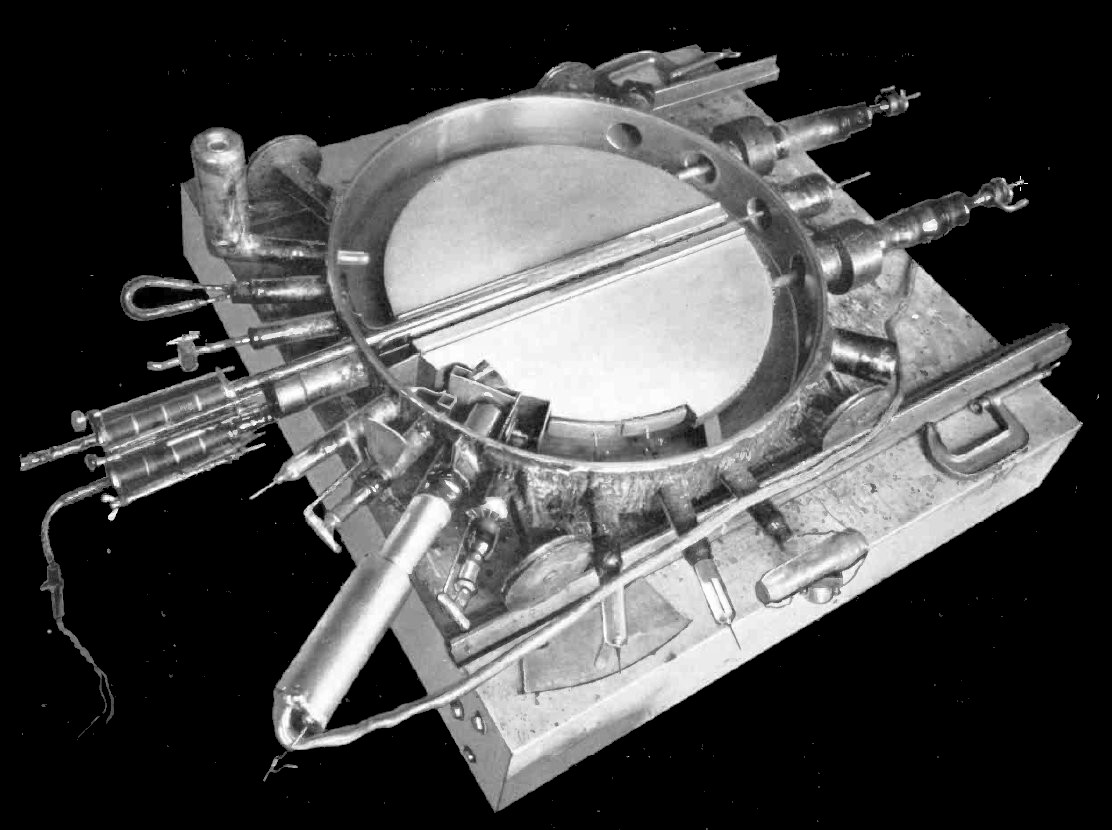
Vacuum chamber of Lawrence 69 cm (27 in) 1932 cyclotron with cover removed, showing the dees. The 13,000 V RF accelerating potential at about 27 MHz is applied to the dees by the two feedlines visible at top right. The beam emerges from the dees and strikes the target in the chamber at bottom.

In a particle accelerator, charged particles are accelerated by applying an electric field across an accelerating gap. The force on a particle crossing this gap is given by the Lorentz force law:

$$\mathbf{F} = q   [\mathbf{E} + (\mathbf{v} \times \mathbf{B})]$$

where q is the charge on the particle, E is the electric field, v is the particle velocity, and B is the magnetic flux density. It is not possible to accelerate particles using only a static magnetic field, as the magnetic force always acts perpendicularly to the direction of motion, and therefore can only change the direction of the particle, not the speed.

In practice, the magnitude of an unchanging electric field which can be applied across a gap is limited by the need to avoid electrostatic breakdown. As such, modern particle accelerators use alternating (radio frequency) electric fields for acceleration. Since an alternating field across a gap only provides an acceleration in the forward direction for a portion of its cycle, particles in RF accelerators travel in bunches, rather than a continuous stream. In a linear particle accelerator, in order for a bunch to "see" a forward voltage every time it crosses a gap, the gaps must be placed further and further apart, in order to compensate for the increasing speed of the particle.

A cyclotron, by contrast, uses a magnetic field to bend the particle trajectories into a spiral, thus allowing the same gap to be used many times to accelerate a single bunch. As the bunch spirals outward, the increasing distance between transits of the gap is exactly balanced by the increase in speed, so a bunch will reach the gap at the same point in the RF cycle every time.

The frequency at which a particle will orbit in a perpendicular magnetic field is known as the cyclotron frequency, and depends, in the non-relativistic case, solely on the charge and mass of the particle, and the magnetic flux density:
$$f = \frac{qB}{2\pi m}$$
where f is the (linear) frequency, q is the charge of the particle, B is the component of the magnetic flux density that is perpendicular to the plane in which the particle is travelling, and m is the particle mass. The property that the frequency is independent of particle velocity is what allows a single, fixed gap to be used to accelerate a particle travelling in a spiral.

=== Particle energy ===
Each time a particle crosses the accelerating gap in a cyclotron, it is given an accelerating force by the electric field across the gap, and the total particle energy gain can be calculated by multiplying the increase per crossing by the number of times the particle crosses the gap.

However, given the typically high number of revolutions, it is usually simpler to estimate the energy by combining the equation for frequency in circular motion:
$$f = \frac{v}{2 \pi r}$$
with the cyclotron frequency equation to yield:
$$v = \frac{q B r}{m}$$

The kinetic energy for particles with speed v is therefore given by:
$$E = \frac{1}{2}m v^2 = \frac{q^2 B^2 r^2}{2 m}$$
where r is the radius at which the energy is to be determined. The limit on the beam energy which can be produced by a given cyclotron thus depends on the maximum radius which can be reached by the magnetic field and the accelerating structures, and on the maximum strength of the magnetic field which can be achieved.

==== K-factor ====
In the nonrelativistic approximation, the maximum kinetic energy per atomic mass for a given cyclotron is given by:
$$\frac{T}{A} = \frac{(e B r_\text{max})^2}{2 m_\text{u}}\left(\frac{Q}{A}\right)^2 = K \left(\frac{Q}{A}\right)^2$$
where $e$ is the elementary charge, $B$ is magnetic flux density, $r_\text{max}$ is the maximum radius of the beam, $m_\text{u}$ is the atomic mass constant, $Q$ is the charge of the beam particles, and $A$ is the atomic mass of the beam particles. The value of K
$$K = \frac{(e B r_\text{max})^2}{2 m_\text{u}}$$
is known as the "K-factor", and is used to characterize the maximum kinetic beam energy of protons (quoted in MeV). It represents the theoretical maximum energy of protons (with Q and A equal to 1) accelerated in a given machine.

=== Particle trajectory ===
The trajectory followed by a particle in the cyclotron approximated with a Fermat's spiral

While the trajectory followed by a particle in the cyclotron is conventionally referred to as a "spiral", it is more accurately described as a series of arcs of constant radius. The particles' speed, and therefore orbital radius, only increases at the accelerating gaps. Away from those regions, the particle will orbit (to a first approximation) at a fixed radius.

Assuming a uniform energy gain per orbit (which is only valid in the non-relativistic case), the average orbit may be approximated by a simple spiral. If the energy gain per turn is given by ΔE, the particle energy after n turns will be:
$$E(n) = n \Delta E$$
Combining this with the non-relativistic equation for the kinetic energy of a particle in a cyclotron gives:
$$r(n) = {\sqrt{2 m \Delta E} \over q B} \sqrt{n}$$
This is the equation of a Fermat spiral.

=== Stability and focusing ===
As a particle bunch travels around a cyclotron, two effects tend to make its particles spread out. The first is simply the particles injected from the ion source having some initial spread of positions and velocities. This spread tends to get amplified over time, making the particles move away from the bunch center. The second is the mutual repulsion of the beam particles due to their electrostatic charges. Keeping the particles focused for acceleration requires confining the particles to the plane of acceleration (in-plane or "vertical" (Note: The terms "horizontal" and "vertical" do not refer to the physical orientation of the cyclotron, but are relative to the plane of acceleration. Vertical is perpendicular to the plane of acceleration, and horizontal is parallel to it.) focusing), preventing them from moving inward or outward from their correct orbit ("horizontal" focusing), and keeping them synchronized with the accelerating RF field cycle (longitudinal focusing).

==== Transverse stability and focusing ====
The in-plane or "vertical" focusing is typically achieved by varying the magnetic field around the orbit, i.e. with azimuth. A cyclotron using this focusing method is thus called an azimuthally-varying field (AVF) cyclotron. The variation in field strength is provided by shaping the steel poles of the magnet into sectors which can have a shape reminiscent of a spiral and also have a larger area towards the outer edge of the cyclotron to improve the vertical focus of the particle beam. This solution for focusing the particle beam was proposed by L. H. Thomas in 1938 and almost all modern cyclotrons use azimuthally-varying fields.

The "horizontal" focusing happens as a natural result of cyclotron motion. Since for identical particles travelling perpendicularly to a constant magnetic field the trajectory curvature radius is only a function of their speed, all particles with the same speed will travel in circular orbits of the same radius, and a particle with a slightly incorrect trajectory will simply travel in a circle with a slightly offset center. Relative to a particle with a centered orbit, such a particle will appear to undergo a horizontal oscillation relative to the centered particle. This oscillation is stable for particles with a small deviation from the reference energy.

==== Longitudinal stability ====
The instantaneous level of synchronization between a particle and the RF field is expressed by phase difference between the RF field and the particle. In the first harmonic mode (i.e. particles make one revolution per RF cycle) it is the difference between the instantaneous phase of the RF field and the instantaneous azimuth of the particle. Fastest acceleration is achieved when the phase difference equals 90° (modulo 360°). Poor synchronization, i.e. phase difference far from this value, leads to the particle being accelerated slowly or even decelerated (outside of the 0–180° range).

As the time taken by a particle to complete an orbit depends only on particle's type, magnetic field (which may vary with the radius), and Lorentz factor (see § Relativistic considerations), cyclotrons have no longitudinal focusing mechanism which would keep the particles synchronized to the RF field. The phase difference, that the particle had at the moment of its injection into the cyclotron, is preserved throughout the acceleration process, but errors from imperfect match between the RF field frequency and the cyclotron frequency at a given radius accumulate on top of it. Failure of the particle to be injected with phase difference within about ±20° from the optimum may make its acceleration too slow and its stay in the cyclotron too long. As a consequence, half-way through the process the phase difference escapes the 0–180° range, the acceleration turns into deceleration, and the particle fails to reach the target energy. Grouping of the particles into correctly synchronized bunches before their injection into the cyclotron thus greatly increases the injection efficiency.

=== Relativistic considerations ===
In the non-relativistic approximation, the cyclotron frequency does not depend upon the particle's speed or the radius of the particle's orbit. As the beam spirals outward, the rotation frequency stays constant, and the beam continues to accelerate as it travels a greater distance in the same time period. In contrast to this approximation, as particles approach the speed of light, the cyclotron frequency decreases due to the change in relativistic mass. This change is proportional to the particle's Lorentz factor.

The relativistic mass can be written as:
$$m = \frac{m_0}{\sqrt{1-\left(\frac{v}{c}\right)^2}} = \frac{m_0}{\sqrt{1-\beta^2}} = \gamma {m_0},$$
where:

- $m_0$ is the particle rest mass,
- $\beta = \frac{v}{c}$ is the relative velocity, and
- $\gamma=\frac{1}{\sqrt{1-\beta^2}}=\frac{1}{\sqrt{1-\left(\frac{v}{c}\right)^2}}$ is the Lorentz factor.

Substituting this into the equations for cyclotron frequency and angular frequency gives:
$$\begin{align}
f & = \frac{q B}{2\pi \gamma m_0} \\[6pt]
\omega & = \frac{q B}{\gamma m_0}
\end{align}$$

The gyroradius for a particle moving in a static magnetic field is then given by:
$$r = \frac{\gamma \beta m_0 c}{q B} = \frac{\gamma m_0 v}{q B} = \frac{m_0}{q B \sqrt{v^{-2} - c^{-2}}}$$

Expressing the speed in this equation in terms of frequency and radius
$$v = 2\pi f r$$
yields the connection between the magnetic field strength, frequency, and radius:
$$\left(\frac{1}{2\pi f}\right)^2 = \left(\frac{m_0}{q B}\right)^2 + \left(\frac{r}{c}\right)^2$$

=== Approaches to relativistic cyclotrons ===
Characteristic properties of cyclotrons and other circular accelerators
	Relativistic	Accelerating field		Bending magnetic field strength		Orbit radius variation
	Relativistic	Origin	Frequency vs time (Note: Only accelerators with time-independent frequency and bending field strength can operate in continuous mode, i.e. output a bunch of particles in each cycle of the accelerating field. If any of these quantities sweeps during the acceleration, the operation mode must be pulsed, i.e. the machine will output a bunch of particles only at the end of each sweep.)	vs time	vs radius	Orbit radius variation
Cyclotrons
Classical cyclotron	No	Electrostatic	Constant	Constant	Constant	Large
Isochronous cyclotron	Yes	Electrostatic	Constant	Constant	Increasing	Large
Synchrocyclotron	Yes	Electrostatic	Decreasing	Constant	Constant (Note: Moderate variation of the field strength with radius does not matter in synchrocyclotrons, because the frequency variation compensates for it automatically.)	Large
Other circular accelerators
FFA	Yes	Electrostatic	DD (Note: Design-dependent)	Constant	DD	Small
Synchrotron	Yes	Electrostatic	Increasing, finite limit	Increasing	N/A (Note: Not applicable, because the particle orbit radius is constant.)	None
Betatron	Yes	Induction	Increasing, finite limit	Increasing	N/A	None

==== Synchrocyclotron ====
Since $\gamma$ increases as the particle reaches relativistic velocities, acceleration of relativistic particles requires modification of the cyclotron to ensure the particle crosses the gap at the same point in each RF cycle. If the frequency of the accelerating electric field is varied while the magnetic field is held constant, this leads to the synchrocyclotron.

In this type of cyclotron, the accelerating frequency is varied as a function of particle orbit radius such that:
$$f(r) = \frac{1}{2\pi \sqrt{\left(\frac{m_0}{q B}\right)^2 + \left(\frac{r}{c}\right)^2}}$$

The decrease in accelerating frequency is tuned to match the increase in gamma for a constant magnetic field.

==== Isochronous cyclotron ====
In isochronous cyclotrons, the magnetic field strength B as a function of the radius r has the same shape as the Lorentz factor γ as a function of the speed v.

If instead the magnetic field is varied with radius while the frequency of the accelerating field is held constant, this leads to the isochronous cyclotron.
$$B(r) = \frac{m_0}{q \sqrt{\left(\frac{1}{2\pi f}\right)^2 - \left(\frac{r}{c}\right)^2}}$$

Keeping the frequency constant allows isochronous cyclotrons to operate in a continuous mode, which makes them capable of producing much greater beam current than synchrocyclotrons. On the other hand, as precise matching of the orbital frequency to the accelerating field frequency is the responsibility of the magnetic field variation with radius, the variation must be precisely tuned.

==== Fixed-field alternating gradient accelerator (FFA) ====
An approach which combines static magnetic fields (as in the synchrocyclotron) and alternating gradient focusing (as in a synchrotron) is the fixed-field alternating gradient accelerator (FFA). In an isochronous cyclotron, the magnetic field is shaped by using precisely machined steel magnet poles. This variation provides a focusing effect as the particles cross the edges of the poles. In an FFA, separate magnets with alternating directions are used to focus the beam using the principle of strong focusing. The field of the focusing and bending magnets in an FFA is not varied over time, so the beam chamber must still be wide enough to accommodate a changing beam radius within the field of the focusing magnets as the beam accelerates.

== Classifications ==
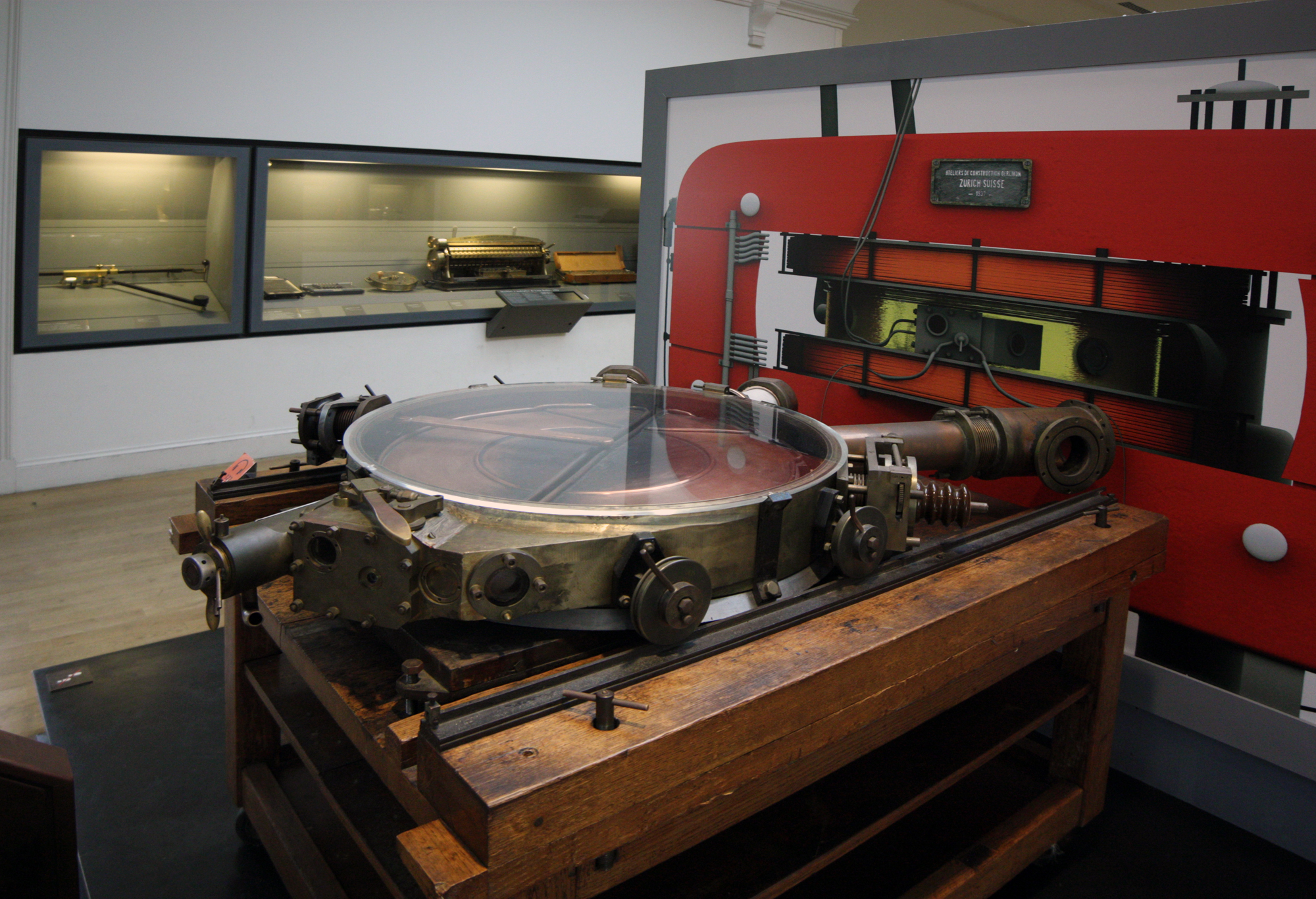
A French cyclotron, produced in Zürich, Switzerland in 1937. The vacuum chamber containing the dees (at left) has been removed from the magnet (red, at right).

=== Cyclotron types ===
There are a number of basic types of cyclotron:

Classical cyclotron
The earliest and simplest cyclotron. Classical cyclotrons have uniform magnetic fields and a constant accelerating frequency. They are limited to nonrelativistic particle velocities (the output energy small compared to the particle's rest energy), and have no active focusing to keep the beam aligned in the plane of acceleration.
Synchrocyclotron
The synchrocyclotron extended the energy of the cyclotron into the relativistic regime by decreasing the frequency of the accelerating field as the orbit of the particles increased to keep it synchronized with the particle revolution frequency. Because this requires pulsed operation, the integrated total beam current was low compared to the classical cyclotron. In terms of beam energy, these were the most powerful accelerators during the 1950s, before the development of the synchrotron.
Isochronous cyclotron (isocyclotron)
These cyclotrons extend output energy into the relativistic regime by altering the magnetic field to compensate for the change in cyclotron frequency as the particles reached relativistic speed. They use specially shaped magnet pole pieces that are wider near the outer diameter of the cyclotron to create a nonuniform magnetic field stronger in peripheral regions. Most modern cyclotrons are of this type. The pole pieces can also be shaped to cause the beam to keep the particles focused in the acceleration plane as they orbit. This is known as "sector focusing" or "azimuthally-varying field focusing", and uses the principle of alternating-gradient focusing.
Separated sector cyclotron
Separated sector cyclotrons are machines in which the magnet is in separate sections, separated by gaps without field.
Superconducting cyclotron
"Superconducting" in the cyclotron context refers to the type of magnet used to bend the particle orbits into a spiral. Superconducting magnets can produce substantially higher fields in the same area than normal conducting magnets, allowing for more compact, powerful machines. The first superconducting cyclotron was the K500 at the Michigan State University, which came online in 1981.

=== Beam types ===
The particles for cyclotron beams are produced in ion sources of various types.

Proton beams
The simplest type of cyclotron beam, proton beams are typically created by ionizing hydrogen gas.
H^{−} beams
Accelerating negative hydrogen ions simplifies extracting the beam from the machine. At the radius corresponding to the desired beam energy, a metal foil is used to strip the electrons from the H^{−} ions, transforming them into positively charged H^{+} ions. The change in polarity causes the beam to be deflected in the opposite direction by the magnetic field, allowing the beam to be transported out of the machine.
Heavy ion beams
Beams of particles heavier than hydrogen are referred to as heavy ion beams, and can range from deuterium nuclei (one proton and one neutron) up to uranium nuclei. The increase in energy required to accelerate heavier particles is balanced by stripping more electrons from the atom to increase the electric charge of the particles, thus increasing acceleration efficiency.

=== Target types ===
To make use of the cyclotron beam, it must be directed to a target.

Internal targets
The simplest way to strike a target with a cyclotron beam is to insert it directly into the path of the beam in the cyclotron. Internal targets have the disadvantage that they must be compact enough to fit within the cyclotron beam chamber, making them impractical for many medical and research uses.
External targets
While extracting a beam from a cyclotron to impinge on an external target is more complicated than using an internal target, it allows for greater control of the placement and focus of the beam, and much more flexibility in the types of targets to which the beam can be directed.

== Usage ==
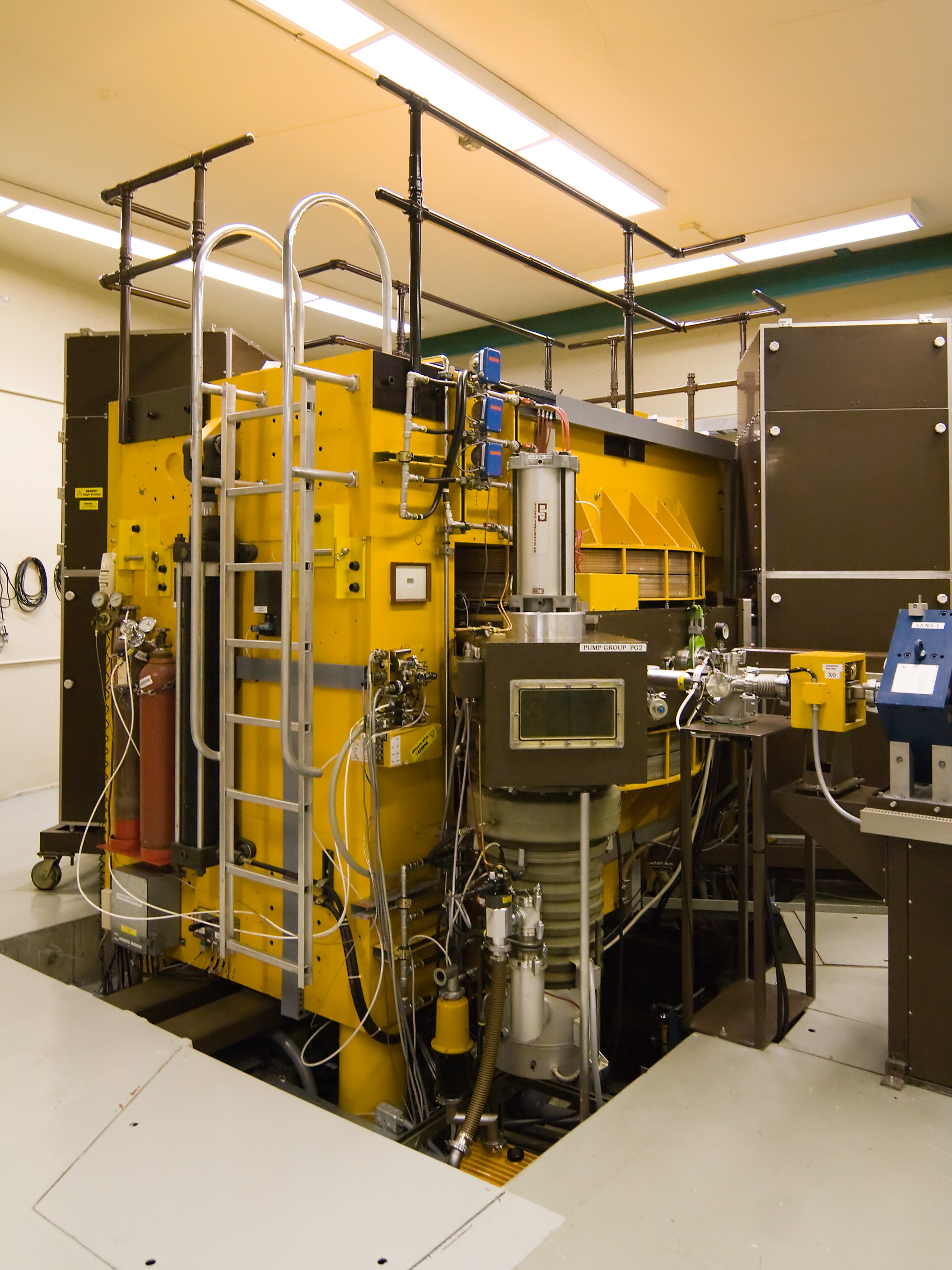
A modern cyclotron used for radiation therapy. The magnet yoke is painted yellow.

=== Basic research ===
For several decades, cyclotrons were the best source of high-energy beams for nuclear physics experiments. With the advent of strong focusing synchrotrons, cyclotrons were supplanted as the accelerators capable of producing the highest energies. However, due to their compactness, and therefore lower expense compared to high-energy synchrotrons, cyclotrons are still used to create beams for research where the primary consideration is not achieving the maximum possible energy. Cyclotron-based nuclear physics experiments are used to measure basic properties of isotopes (particularly short lived radioactive isotopes) including half-life, mass, interaction cross sections, and decay schemes.

=== Medical uses ===
==== Radioisotope production ====
Cyclotron beams can be used to bombard other atoms to produce short-lived isotopes with a variety of medical uses, including medical imaging and radiotherapy. Positron and gamma emitting isotopes, such as fluorine-18, carbon-11, and technetium-99m are used for PET and SPECT imaging. While cyclotron produced radioisotopes are widely used for diagnostic purposes, therapeutic uses are still largely in development. Proposed isotopes include astatine-211, palladium-103, rhenium-186, and bromine-77, among others.

==== Beam therapy ====
The first suggestion that energetic protons could be an effective treatment method was made by Robert R. Wilson in a paper published in 1946 while he was involved in the design of the Harvard Cyclotron Laboratory.

Beams from cyclotrons can be used in particle therapy to treat cancer. Ion beams from cyclotrons can be used, as in proton therapy, to penetrate the body and kill tumors by radiation damage, while minimizing damage to healthy tissue along their path.

As of 2020, there were approximately 80 facilities worldwide for radiotherapy using beams of protons and heavy ions, consisting of a mixture of cyclotrons and synchrotrons. Cyclotrons are primarily used for proton beams, while synchrotrons are used to produce heavier ions.

== Advantages and limitations ==
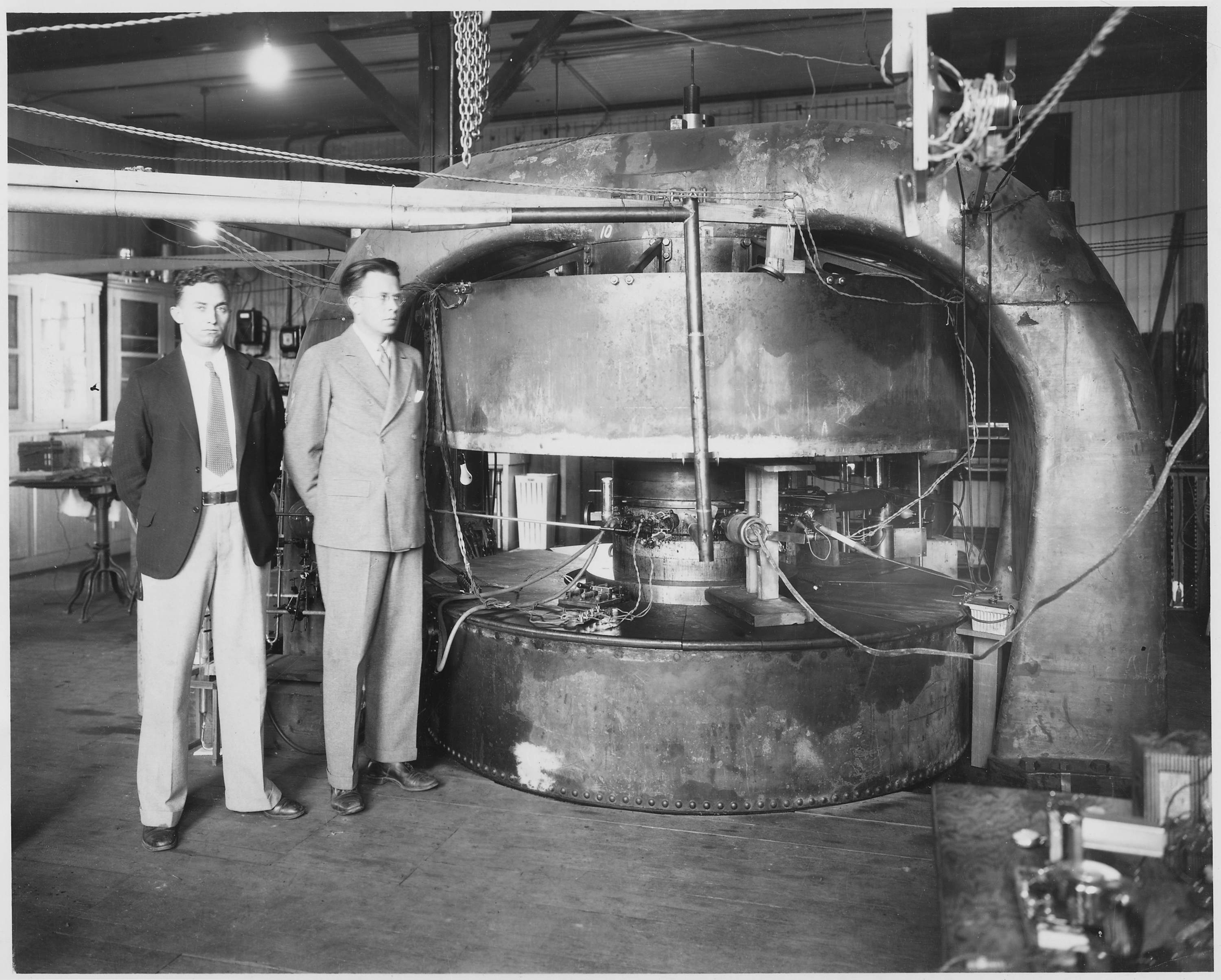
Livingston (left) and Lawrence with the 69 cm (27 in) cyclotron at the Lawrence Radiation Laboratory. The metal arch supports the magnet's core, and the large cylindrical boxes contain the coils of wire that generate the magnetic field. The vacuum chamber containing the "dee" electrodes is in the center between the magnet's poles.

The most obvious advantage of a cyclotron over a linear accelerator is that because the same accelerating gap is used many times, it is both more space efficient and more cost efficient; particles can be brought to higher energies in less space, and with less equipment. The compactness of the cyclotron reduces other costs as well, such as foundations, radiation shielding, and the enclosing building. Cyclotrons have a single electrical driver, which saves both equipment and power costs. Furthermore, cyclotrons are able to produce a continuous beam of particles at the target, so the average power passed from a particle beam into a target is relatively high compared to the pulsed beam of a synchrotron.

However, as discussed above, a constant frequency acceleration method is only possible when the accelerated particles are approximately obeying Newton's laws of motion. If the particles become fast enough that relativistic effects become important, the beam slips out of phase with the oscillating electric field, and cannot receive any additional acceleration. The classical cyclotron (constant field and frequency) is therefore only capable of accelerating particles up to a few percent of the speed of light. Synchro-, isochronous, and other types of cyclotrons can overcome this limitation, with the tradeoff of increased complexity and cost.

An additional limitation of cyclotrons is due to space charge effects – the mutual repulsion of the particles in the beam. As the amount of particles (beam current) in a cyclotron beam is increased, the effects of electrostatic repulsion grow stronger until they disrupt the orbits of neighboring particles. This puts a functional limit on the beam intensity, or the number of particles which can be accelerated at one time, as distinct from their energy.

== Notable examples ==
Name	Country	Date	Energy	Beam	Diameter	In use?	Comments	Ref
Lawrence 4.5-inch Cyclotron	United States	1931	80 keV	Protons	4.5 inches (0.11 m)	No	First working cyclotron	
Leningrad cyclotron	Soviet Union	1934	530 keV	Protons	0.28 m	No	First cyclotron outside Berkeley	
Lawrence 184-inch Cyclotron	United States	1946	380 MeV	Alpha particles, deuterium, protons	184 inches (4.7 m)	No	First synchrocyclotron and largest single-magnet cyclotron ever constructed	
TU Delft Isochronous Cyclotron	Netherlands	1958	12 MeV	Protons	0.36 m	No	First isochronous cyclotron	
Lawrence Berkeley National Laboratory 88-inch Cyclotron	United States	1961	60 MeV	Protons, Alpha Particles, Neutrons, Heavy Ions	88 inches (2.2 m)	Yes	Oldest continuously operated large cyclotron in existence; Lawrence's last cyclotron	
PSI Ring Cyclotron	Switzerland	1974	590 MeV	Protons	15 m	Yes	Highest beam power of any cyclotron	
TRIUMF 520 MeV	Canada	1976	520 MeV	H^{−}	56 feet (17 m)	Yes	Largest normal conducting cyclotron ever constructed	
Michigan State University K500	United States	1982	500 MeV/u	Heavy Ion	52 inches (1.3 m)	Yes	First superconducting cyclotron	
RIKEN Superconducting Ring Cyclotron	Japan	2006	400 MeV/u	Heavy Ion	18.4 m	Yes	K-value of 2600 is highest ever achieved	

== Superconducting cyclotron examples ==
A superconducting cyclotron uses superconducting magnets to achieve high magnetic field in a small diameter and with lower power requirements. These cyclotrons require a cryostat to house the magnet and cool it to superconducting temperatures. Some of these cyclotrons are being built for medical therapy.

Name	Country	Date	Energy	Beam	Diameter	In use?	Ref
Michigan State University K500	United States	1982	500 MeV/u	Heavy Ion	52 inches (130 cm)	Yes	
Texas A&M University Cyclotron Institute K500	United States	1987	70 MeV (protons), 15 MeV/u	Protons, Heavy Ions	1.15 metres (45 in)	Yes	
Laboratori nazionali del Sud K800	Italy	1994	80 MeV	Protons, Heavy ions	0.9 metres (35 in)	Yes	
University Medical Center Groningen AGOR	Netherlands	1996	120-190 MeV (protons), 30-90 MeV/u (Heavy Ions)	Protons, Light ions, Heavy ions	3.2 metres (130 in)	Yes	
Variable Energy Cyclotron Centre K500	India	2009	80 MeV/u (Light Ions), 5-10 MeV/u (Heavy Ions)	Protons, deuterons, Alpha particles, Heavy ions	3 metres (120 in)	Yes	
Ionetix ION-12SC	United States	2016	12.5 MeV	Proton	88 centimetres (35 in)	Yes	

== Related technologies ==
The spiraling of electrons in a cylindrical vacuum chamber within a transverse magnetic field is also employed in the magnetron, a device for producing high frequency radio waves (microwaves). In the magnetron, electrons are bent into a circular path by a magnetic field, and their motion is used to excite resonant cavities, producing electromagnetic radiation.

A betatron uses the change in the magnetic field to accelerate electrons in a circular path. While static magnetic fields cannot provide acceleration, as the force always acts perpendicularly to the direction of particle motion, changing fields can be used to induce an electromotive force in the same manner as in a transformer. The betatron was developed in 1940, although the idea had been proposed substantially earlier.

A synchrotron is another type of particle accelerator that uses magnets to bend particles into a circular trajectory. Unlike in a cyclotron, the particle path in a synchrotron has a fixed radius. Particles in a synchrotron pass accelerating stations at increasing frequency as they get faster. To compensate for this frequency increase, both the frequency of the applied accelerating electric field and the magnetic field must be increased in tandem, leading to the "synchro" portion of the name.

== In fiction ==
The United States Department of War famously asked for dailies of the Superman comic strip to be pulled in April 1945 for having Superman bombarded with the radiation from a cyclotron.

In the 1984 film Ghostbusters, a miniature cyclotron forms part of the proton pack used for catching ghosts.

== See also ==
- Cyclotron radiation – radiation produced by non-relativistic charged particles bent by a magnetic field
- Fast neutron therapy – a type of beam therapy that may use accelerator produced beams
- Microtron – an accelerator concept similar to the cyclotron which uses a linear accelerator type accelerating structure with a constant magnetic field.
- Radiation reaction force – a braking force on beams that are bent in a magnetic field
