= V. G. Khlopin Radium Institute =

Russian research institute

- Founded: 1922
- Type: NGO
- Purpose: nuclear physics, radiochemistry and radioecology
- Location: 2nd Murinsky prospect, 28, Saint Petersburg, Russia
- Region served: Russian Federation
- Key people: Acting CEO: Mr Russkikh Ivan Mikhailovich
- Subsidiaries: Rosatom
- Website: khlopin.ru (in Russian)

The V. G. Khlopin Radium Institute, also known as the First Radium Institute, is a research and production institution located in Saint Petersburg specializing in the fields of nuclear physics, radio- and geochemistry, and on ecological topics, associated with the problems of nuclear power engineering, radioecology, and isotope production. It is a subsidiary company of the Rosatom Russian state corporation.

The institute was founded as State Radium Institute in 1922 under the initiative of V. I. Vernadskiy, integrating all radiological enterprises present in St. Petersburg (then Petrograd) at that time. This also included a factory in Bondyuga (Tatarstan), which was used by Vitaly Khlopin and others to generate Russia's first high-enriched radium compound. The Radium Institute under Abram Ioffe was relocated to Kazan in World War II.

The Radium Institute was renamed to V. G. Khlopin in his honor in 1950.

At the Radium Institute, the first European cyclotron was proposed by George Gamow and Lev Mysovskii in 1932, being constructed with the help of Igor Kurchatov, operational by 1937.

== See also ==
- Yuri A. Barbanel
- Abram Ioffe
- Konstantin Petrzhak
