= Vitaly Khlopin =

Russian chemist (1890–1950)

Vitaly Grigorievich Khlopin
- Born: 26 January [O.S. 14 January] 1890; Perm, Russian Empire
- Died: July 10, 1950 (aged 60); Leningrad, USSR
- Education: Saint Petersburg Imperial University, University of Göttingen
- Awards: Hero of Socialist Labour, Order of Lenin, Medal "For Valiant Labour in the Great Patriotic War 1941–1945", Stalin Prize
- Scientific career
- Fields: Chemistry, Radiochemistry
- Workplaces: Radium Institute
- Doctoral students: Zinaida Yershova, Joseph Starik

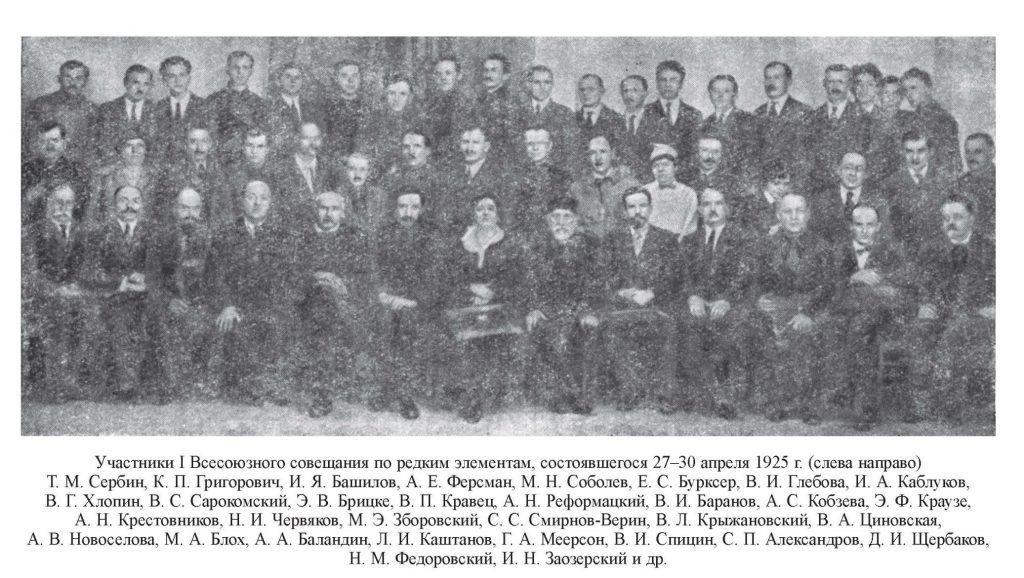
V.G. Khlopin at the 1st All-Union Meeting on Rare Elements, 1925

Vitaly Grigorievich Khlopin (Russian: Вита́лий Григо́рьевич Хло́пин) (January 1890 - 10 July 1950) was a Russian and Soviet radiochemist, professor, academician of the USSR Academy of Sciences (1939), Hero of Socialist Labour (1949), and director of the Radium Institute of the USSR Academy of Sciences (1939-1950). He was one of the founders of Soviet radiochemistry and radium industry, received the first domestic radium preparations (1921), one of the founders of the Radium Institute and leading participants in the atomic project and founder of the school of Soviet radiochemists.

== Biography ==
He was born on January 14 (26), 1890 in Perm, in the family of a doctor Grigory Vitalievich Khlopin (1863-1929). From 1905 the Khlopins lived in St. Petersburg.

Brief chronology of his life path:

- 1897 - began studying at a private men's school in Yuriev;
- 1908 - graduated from the 12th St. Petersburg Gymnasium;
- 1911 - graduated from the chemistry department of the University of Göttingen.
- 1911—1913 - at the St. Petersburg Clinical Institute of the Grand Duchess Helena Pavlovna he taught practical sessions on chemical methods of sanitary analyses;
- 1912 - graduated with a first degree diploma from the Faculty of Physics and Mathematics of St. Petersburg University in chemistry;
- 1912-1917 - remained at the University at the Department of General Chemistry as an assistant, where under the guidance of L. A. Chugaev he was being prepared for teaching (the first work with L. A. Chugaev on the synthesis of complex compounds of platonitrite with dithioethers);
- 1913-1916 - engaged in experimental research in the chemistry of platinum compounds and analysis of rare elements;
- 1914, 1915 - laboratory assistant at the Petrograd Central City Chemical Laboratory;
- 1915 - at the suggestion of Academician V.I. Vernadsky he started working in the Radiological Laboratory of the Academy of Sciences (organized in the autumn of 1911 in the former studio of A.I. Quindzhi on Vasilievsky Island) as a specialist in chemistry (until 1921);
- 1915, 1916 - at the suggestion of the Chemical Committee at the State Academy of Sciences, conducts experimental work on obtaining products of military-chemical importance (some asphyxiants) and on developing methods for obtaining pure platinum from Russian raw materials, and on behalf of the Central Laboratory of the Central Laboratory of the Navy Department participates in the development of a method for obtaining sodium azide;
- Autumn 1916 - the Military Chemical Committee sent as a specialist in chemistry as the head of sanitary and evacuation part in the "Urmiyskaya Expedition for the survey of boron-acid springs of the Kara region and the Urmiysky lake area";
- 1916 - member of the Commission for the Study of the Natural Productive Forces of Russia (CNPF);
- 1917 - until the liquidation of the Committee for Military Labor Assistance - secretary of its Chemical Division and chairman of the Commission on Luminous Compounds; in October participated in the work of the Congress on Technical Defense of the State; assistant at the Department of General Chemistry I of Petrograd University (until 1924);
- 1918-1919 - in summer he was elected Commissioner of the Board formed under the NPFR for the organization of the first Radium Plant in Russia. V. G. Khlopin was entrusted with the general management of issues related to the chemical and administrative side of the case; in December he was elected as a representative of CNPF to the Council of the Radium Association; from January 1919 he was a member of the Council of the Chemical Division of the Russian Technical Society; from July 1918 to September 1919 he was a member of the Council of the Platinum Institute;
- 1918-1934 - member of the editorial board of the Chemical-Technical Publishing House, later transformed into the publishing house Chemteoret;
- 1920 - elected Professor of the Department of General Chemistry at the Ural State University (unable to travel to the Urals, he was forced to give up his position);
- 1921 - on December 1, V. G. Khlopin obtained the first highly active preparations of domestic radium;

1922-1934 - Head of the gas department of NPFR, - Geochemical Institute of the USSR Academy of Sciences (Leningrad);

- 1922 - began research at the Radium Institute in Petrograd (Leningrad);
- 1922-1935 - deputy director and head of the chemical department; from 1924 (simultaneously at the Leningrad University) he headed the gas department of the Geochemical Institute of the USSR Academy of Sciences and the Helium Laboratory of the Soyuzgaz Trust;
- 1924 - V. G. Khlopin suggested the idea that the process of fractional crystallization is caused by the distribution of matter between two immiscible phases (crystals and saturated solution) - the law of microcomponent distribution between liquid and solid phases (Khlopin's law); since summer he has been holding meetings with students of the Physics and Mathematics Faculty of Moscow State University;
- 1924-1930 - associate professor at Leningrad State University;
- 1924-1933 - member of the Scientific and Technical Council on Helium at the Helium Committee of the Supreme Council of National Economy; took an active part in the search and study of helium deposits and the development of analytical methods for determining helium;
- 1925 - at the IV Mendeleev Congress made a report on "Achievements in the field of radioactive substances in the USSR"; scientific trip to Germany;
- 1928-1934 - member of the Committee for the Chemicalization of the National Economy under the Council of People's Commissars of the USSR (hereinafter - under the Presidium of the USSR State Planning Committee);
- 1929, 1930 - Head of hydrochemical works of the Alagez Party of the USSR Academy of Sciences;
- 1930-1936 - permanent consultant on radium industry at the plant "Rare Elements" (existed until 1931, since 1931 Giredmet was established on its basis) of Soyuzredmet (then Glavredmet);
- 1931, 1932 - Scientific Director of the Geochemical Institute of the USSR Academy of Sciences;
- 1933 - Corresponding Member of the USSR Academy of Sciences; member of the Scientific and Technical Council on Helium at the USSR State Planning Committee;
- 1933-1938 - consultant of the laboratory of the Soyuzgaz Trust, later Heliogazrazvedka (Leningrad);
- 1934-1937 - professor at the Leningrad State University;
- 1935 - approved by the Presidium of the USSR Academy of Sciences with the degree of Chemistry Philosophy Doctor;
- 1936-1946 - Director of the Radium Institute of the USSR Academy of Sciences (Leningrad);
- 1937 - pays much attention to the study of the chemical nature of products of artificial decay of uranium and thorium, which became possible due to irradiation of their preparations at the cyclotron launched at the Radium Institute - the first in Europe;
- 1938 - consultant to the State Institute of Rare and Minor Metals of the People's Commissariat for Rare and Minor Metals (Moscow);
- 1939 - full member of the USSR Academy of Sciences;
- 1940 - Chairman of the Committee on Uranium Problem at the Presidium of the USSR Academy of Sciences;
- 1941, 1942 - in evacuation in Kazan, directed the activities of the Radium Institute; Deputy Chairman of the USSR Academy of Sciences Commission for Mobilization of Volga Region Resources; Deputy Academician-Secretary of the Chemical Department of the USSR Academy of Sciences;
- 1943 - Stalin Prize of the third degree for the development of a method of industrial production of radium;
- 1945 - in Leningrad University V. G. Khlopin headed the first in the USSR chair of radiochemistry, where he gave the first in the Soviet Union course of lectures on radioactivity - the training of a new generation of radiochemists for research organizations and nuclear industry began;
- 1947 - V. G. Khlopin and E. K. Gerling developed a new method for determining geologic age by xenon accumulated during spontaneous uranium fission.

He died on July 10, 1950, and was buried in Leningrad, at the Tikhvin Cemetery in the Alexander Nevsky Lavra.

== Family ==
- Father - Grigory Vitalievich Khlopin (1863-1929).
- Mother - Ekaterina Alexandrovna, née Kavaderova (1865-1945) - a graduate of the Higher Women's Courses in St. Petersburg (verbal-historical and physical-mathematical faculties), was engaged in journalism. (at the time of G. V. Khlopin's exile to the Urals in 1886), from 1905, when the Khlopins lived already in St. Petersburg, Ekaterina Alexandrovna was engaged in charity work. She died on the road during the re-evacuation of the State Radium University from Kazan to Leningrad.
  - Brother - Nikolai Grigorievich Khlopin, a histologist.

Khlopin was first married to Nadezhda Pavlovna Annenkova (daughter of the Narodovtsy P. S. Annenkov[clarification]).

- A daughter (born 1913), whom they baptized in a church in Kuokkala.
- In 1920 he married Maria Alexandrovna Pasvik.

== Scientific works ==
V. G. Khlopin began his independent scientific activity as a student in 1911 - in his father's laboratory at the Clinical Institute he carried out work, the results of which were published in the article "On the formation of oxidants in the air under the action of ultraviolet rays".

In these studies V. G. Khlopin first proved the formation in atmospheric air under the action of ultraviolet rays not only hydrogen peroxide and ozone, but also nitrogen oxides, the latter statement began a long discussion that lasted until 1931, when D. Vorländer (German: D. Vorländer) proved the correctness of the observations of V. G. Khlopin.

The circle of V. G. Khlopin's interests is not strictly confined to any one area. It is determined by the school, which he passed under the guidance of L. A. Chugaev and V. I. Vernadsky, respectively - in general chemistry and geochemistry, which, in turn, allowed V. G. Khlopin to develop his own scientific direction - to create the first domestic school of radiochemists.

=== Working with L. A. Chugaev ===
At the initial stage of his research activity (1911-1917), V. G. Khlopin was mainly concerned with problems related to inorganic and analytical chemistry. In 1913, together with L. A. Chugaev, he worked on the synthesis of complex compounds of platonitrite with dithioethers. Of his further works, especially important are those aimed at the development of a new method for the preparation of various derivatives of univalent nickel, and the creation of a device for determining the solubility of compounds at different temperatures.

To the most interesting works of this period belongs the discovery of hydroxopentamine series of complex compounds of platinum made in 1915 by L. A. Chugaev and V. G. Khlopin; curiously, but methodologically, from the point of view of the theory of cognition, it is quite natural that historically it was made somewhat earlier than the discovery by L. A. Chugaev and N. A. Vladimirov of the pentamine series, later called Chugaev's salts.

Two works hold a special place in this period of V. G. Khlopin's scientific work: 1. The action of hydrosulfur sodium salt on metallic selenium and tellurium, leading to the development of a convenient method of obtaining sodium telluride and selenide and a convenient synthesis of organic compounds of tellurium and selenium (1914), 2. On the action of hydrosulfurosodium salt on nickel salts in the presence of nitrous sodium salt. The work led to the synthesis of univalent nickel derivatives (1915), which were much later (in 1925) obtained in Germany by S. Mansho and co-workers by the action of carbon monoxide and nitric oxide on nickel salts.

Here, at the same department, already in the First World War, on the assignment of the Chemical Committee of the Main Artillery Department, V.G. Khlopin performed his first technological work - he developed a method of obtaining pure platinum from Russian raw materials. The importance of this work was due to the sharp reduction of imports. His participation in several expeditions aimed at identifying Russia's natural resources was subordinated to the solution of the same problems. He wrote reviews on rare elements: boron, lithium, rubidium, cesium and zirconium.

=== At V. I. Vernadsky’s laboratory ===
All of V.G. Khlopin's further scientific activity was predetermined by this meeting. In the laboratory founded by Vladimir Ivanovich Vernadsky, a systematic study of radioactive minerals and rocks was carried out, the search for which in Russia was carried out by expeditions, also organized on his initiative. V. I. Vernadsky was the first Russian scientist who realized the importance of the discovery of radioactivity: "...For us it is not completely indifferent at all how radioactive minerals of Russia will be studied... Now, when mankind is entering a new age of radiant - atomic energy, we, and not others, should know, should find out what the soil of our native country holds in this respect".

In 1909 V. I. Vernadsky headed the research of radioactivity phenomena in Russia, under his chairmanship the Radium Commission was organized - all the works were united under the auspices of the Academy of Sciences, the Radiological Laboratory was founded, since 1914 the publication of the "Proceedings of the Radium Expedition of the Academy of Sciences" was started. In the mentioned speech V. I. Vernadsky notes the specific features of the new direction of scientific research: "This discovery has produced a huge revolution in the scientific outlook, caused the creation of a new science, different from physics and chemistry - the doctrine of radioactivity, put before life and technology practical tasks of a completely new kind...".

In 1915, V. I. Vernadsky attracted V. G. Khlopin to work in the Radiological Laboratory. V. G. Khlopin was destined to become the first, and for many years - the leading specialist in the new discipline. But research in the field of radioactivity, study of new radioactive elements already discovered in Russia at that time was still in the state of initial organizational period - there were no domestic radium preparations for laboratory experiments; however, deposits of minerals and ores - raw materials for consistent development of scientific work in this direction, systematic study of radioactive minerals - were already known. The leading experts of the profile - Professors K. A. Nenadkevich and A. E. Fersman - were invited to participate in the present work.

In the context of mastering the fundamental areas of activity, which for V.G. Khlopin became his life's work, he develops research of scientific and applied aspects, including methods of geochemistry of radioactive elements and noble gases, analytical chemistry and thermodynamics; at the same time, the scientist develops an independent direction, which gave the preconditions for the formation of a scientific school. By the early 1920s, four main lines had emerged, which in turn led to the establishment of an independent school: 1. radium technology; 2. chemistry of radioelements and applied radiochemistry; 3. geochemistry of radioelements and noble gases; 4.analytical chemistry.

=== First trial radium plant ===
In 1917, the purely scientific interest in the study of radium was replaced by the practical need to use it for military purposes - the military department and defense organizations received information that radium was used for the production of light compounds. The necessity of radium extraction from domestic raw materials became urgent. A large batch of radium-containing ore from the Tyuya-Muyun deposit was stored in the warehouse of a private commercial firm "Fergana Society for Rare Metals Mining". This organization, due to the lack of specialists-radiochemists in Russia, was preparing the raw material for shipment to Germany for technological extraction of the final product from it, but the war and then the February Revolution of 1917 prevented this.

The Congress for the Technical Defense of the State in October 1917 decided to organize a special radium plant under the direct control of the Academy of Sciences, but the October Socialist Revolution again removed this issue from the queue. In January 1918 V. G. Khlopin published an article "A Few Words on the Application of Radioactive Elements in Military Technology and on the Possible Future of the Radium Industry in Russia", in which he characterized the importance and prospective use of radium for military-strategic purposes. In the spring of the same year, the Presidium of the All-Russian Council of National Economy (RCNE) decided to sequester radioactive raw materials belonging to the "Fergana Society"; in April, the Chemical Department of the RCNE, headed by Prof. L. Ya. Karpov, entrusted the Academy of Sciences with the mission of organizing a plant for radium extraction from domestic uranium-vanadium ores and ensuring scientific control over production; at a meeting of specialists convened on 12 April by the Commission for the Study of the Natural Productive Forces of Russia (NPFR), headed by N. S. Kovalev. С. Kurnakov, V. G. Khlopin and L. I. Bogoyavlensky it was reported on the results of the work undertaken to obtain radium from the available raw materials; in July 1918 a special Commission, the Technical Council or later the Board for the organization of a radium plant at the Academy of Sciences was elected, which decided to organize a research laboratory, a special Radium Department (under the Commission) headed by V. I. Vernadsky was established under the chairmanship of A. E. Fersman, senior mineralogist of the Academy of Sciences, professor of the Higher Women's Courses. The secretary of the department, a specialist of the Radium Laboratory of the Academy, an assistant of the Department of General Chemistry of the Petrograd University, 28-year-old V. G. Khlopin, was appointed its commissioner for the organization of the radium plant. His thorough theoretical training and mastery of the methods of fine chemical analysis, his ability to solve practical problems effectively, and his experience in expeditions fully justified his involvement in such a responsible business. L. N. Bogoyavlensky, a specialist on this subject, was invited as the head of the plant.

"October 28, 1918.Uralsovnarkhoz (Perm), Usolsk executive committee, Management of Berezniki soda plant. «I order the Berezniki plant to immediately begin work on the organization of a radium plant according to the resolution of the Vysovnarkhoz. The necessary funds have been allocated by the Council of People's Commissars. The work should be carried out under the direction and responsibility of chemical engineer Bogoyavlensky, to whom I propose to render full assistance. Chairman of the Council of People 's Commissars Lenin»".

Lenin V. I. Complete Collected Works, vol. 50, p. 375.[24]

In 1918, all radioactive residues that were in Petrograd were evacuated inland - first to the Berezniki soda plant in Perm province, and in May 1920, already by the new plant manager I. Ya. Bashilov, - to the Bondyuzhsky chemical plant of Khimosnov (now Khimzavod named after L. Y. Karpov in Mendeleevsk), where only in the fall of 1920 it became possible to put into operation a temporary pilot plant for radium extraction.

== Radioactive substances technology ==
V. G. Khlopin developed a method of mechanical enrichment to improve the quality of raw barium-radium sulfates rich in silica (together with engineer S. P. Alexandrov). Later, the scientist transformed the Curie-Debierne method of conversion of sulfates into carbonates under the condition of saturation of sulfates with silica - through the combination of soda with caustic soda (together with P. A. Volkov).

On the basis of theoretical assumptions, V. G. Khlopin proposed several methods of fractional crystallization of barium-radium salts, excluding evaporation of solutions - by increasing the concentration of the same ion in the cold: fractional precipitation of chlorides with hydrochloric acid (1921), fractional precipitation of bromides (together with M. A. Pasvik, 1923), fractional precipitation of nitrates (with P. I. Tolmachev, with A. P. Ratner, 1924-1930). A. Pasvik, 1923), fractional precipitation of nitrates (with P. I. Tolmachev, with A. P. Ratner, 1924-1930), fractional precipitation of chromates (M. S. Merkulova), fractional precipitation of chlorides with zinc chloride (I. Y. Bashilov and Y. S. Vilnyansky, 1926).

In 1924, V. G. Khlopin created a general theory of the fractional crystallization process, which greatly facilitated the calculation of the technological process in general and the development of the required apparatus for its implementation in particular. A number of versions of the conventional crystallization scheme were hereby based on calculations used in plant practice. Later this theory was applied and developed in the All-Russian Research Institute of Chemical Reagents and Particularly Pure Chemicals for obtaining chemically pure substances by recrystallization.

== Chemistry of radio elements and applied radiochemistry ==
In this field, V. G. Khlopin and his colleagues and students (M. S. Merkulova, V. I. Grebenshchikov and others) developed a methodology for studying the process of isomorphous coprecipitation of microcomponents and ways to achieve equilibrium in the solid phase-solution system, - the influence of many factors on this process was established and the hypothesis of V. G. Khlopin (1924) about the subordination of the process of fractional crystallization to the law of substance distribution between two immiscible phases was proved (Khlopin's law). The possibility of using the method of isomorphic co-crystallization not only for the isolation of radioactive elements, but also for the study of their state in liquid and solid phases - for determining their valence was shown. V. G. Khlopin and A. G. Samartseva established the existence of compounds of divalent and hexavalent polonium by this method. The process of adsorption of crystalline precipitates by the surface was also studied, - the distribution between the gas phase and crystalline precipitate, as well as between the salt melt and the solid phase.

Thus, in this section, V. G. Khlopin's studies address the following key issues:
1. conditions for achieving true (thermodynamic) microcomponent equilibrium between the crystalline solid phase and solution;
2. the use of radioelements as indicators in determining the mechanism of isomorphic substitution of dissociated ions;
3. application of general laws of isomorphous substitution for development of a method for fixation of chemical compounds present in extremely small proportions and unstable in the solid phase, establishment of their valence and chemical type, - for revealing new chemical equilibria both in the solid phase and in solution;
4. conditions of adsorption equilibrium between solid crystalline phase and solution.

=== Thermodynamic equilibrium of microcomponent ===
It has been rigorously experimentally established that:
a) When a true (thermodynamic) equilibrium is reached between a crystalline solid phase (electrolyte) and a solution, the microcomponent present in the solution and isomorphic with the solid phase is distributed between the two immiscible solvents according to the Berthelot-Nernst law and at that in all known cases in its simple form: Ск/Ср=К or

$\frac{x}{a-x} = D \frac{y}{b-y}$

where x is the amount of microcomponent transferred into crystals, a is the total amount of microcomponent, y and b are the corresponding values for macrocomponent.
b) The mechanism responsible for achieving true equilibrium between the crystalline phase and the solution is reduced to the process of multiple recrystallization of the solid phase, that replaces in the considered case practically absent under ordinary conditions the diffusion process in the solid state. Recrystallization at submicroscopic sizes of crystals proceeds extremely fast, thus in crystallization from supersaturated solutions recrystallization and establishment of equilibrium are finished at the stage when crystallites are small enough.

c) In the case of slow crystallization not from supersaturated solutions, but from saturated ones, in particular, due to slow evaporation, the true equilibrium between crystals and solution is not observed, and the distribution of the microcomponent between the solid phase and solution proceeds in this case according to the logarithmic law of Goskins and Derner, developed on the basis of the idea of continuous ion exchange between the faces of the growing crystal and the solution

$\ln\frac{a}{a-x} = \lambda \ln\frac{b}{b-y}$

Here, as above: a is the total amount of microcomponent, x is the amount of microcomponent transferred to the solid phase, b is the total amount of macrocomponent, y is the amount of macrocomponent transferred to the solid phase.
d) An abrupt change in the value of D with a change in temperature or in the composition of the liquid phase is an indicator of the occurrence of a new chemical equilibrium in solution or in the solid phase. The case of distribution of the microcomponent between the crystalline solid phase and the solution (according to the Berthelot-Nernst or Goskins and Derner law) can serve as evidence for the formation between the microcomponent and the anion or cation of the solid phase of compounds crystallizing isomorphically with the solid phase.

=== Radioactive elements as indicators ===
Radioactive elements (Ra and RaD) were used by V. G. Khlopin and B. A. Nikitin as indicators in determining the nature of a new kind of mixed Gramm crystals. These studies showed a fundamental difference between true mixed crystals in the spirit of Eilhard Mitscherlich, when the substitution of one component for another is expressed in the form of ion for ion, or atom for atom, molecule for molecule, and mixed crystals of a new kind, in which such a simple substitution is impossible, and proceeds by means of very small sizes of the ready sections of the crystal lattice of each component. Scientists have shown that mixed crystals of a new kind fundamentally differ from true mixed crystals by the presence of a low miscibility limit - they are not formed at low concentration of one of the components at all. In this case, they are similar to anomalous mixed crystals (as shown experimentally by V. G. Khlopin and M. A. Tolstaya), and relate to the latter approximately as a colloidal solution with suspension. These works (on the structure and properties of mixed crystals of a new kind and anomalous mixed crystals) led V. G. Khlopin to the idea of the need to classify isomorphic bodies not by considering the structure of isomorphic mixtures in static equilibrium (as it was done, for example, by V. G. Goldschmidt and his school), but according to the methods of substitution of components - taking into account the dynamics of the formation of an isomorphic mixture. In this case, all isomorphic bodies are strictly divided into two groups according to the method of substitution:

(a) Isomorphic compounds in the spirit of E. Mitscherlich, truly isomorphic. Substitution in the formation of mixed crystals by such compounds occurs according to the first principle: ion on ion, etc. The above distribution laws apply to such crystals. Such compounds have similar chemical composition and molecular structure.

(b) All other isomorphic compounds, when the formation of mixed crystals is conditioned by the second principle: substitution of sites from the unit cell or close to them (mixed crystals of a new kind or isomorphic of the 2nd kind according to W.G. Goldschmidt), up to microscopic - anomalous mixed crystals such as FeCl_{2} — NH_{4}Cl, Ba(NO_{3})_{2}, Pb(NO_{2})_{2}, methylene blue K_{2}SO_{4} - Ponsorot, etc., showing heterogeneity).

3.Thanks to the works discussed in the previous two paragraphs, V. G. Khlopin was able to present in a new form the law of E. Mitscherlich, which makes it possible to judge the composition and molecular structure of unknown compounds on the basis of their formation of isomorphous mixtures with compounds whose composition and molecular structure are known. V.G. Khlopin proposed the method of isomorphous co-crystallization from solutions for fixation of weightless and unstable chemical compounds and determination of their composition. The method made it possible to discover and determine the composition of individual compounds of divalent and hexavalent polonium (V. G. Khlopin and A. G. Samartseva).

4. Studying adsorption of isomorphous ions on the surface of crystalline precipitates, V. G. Khlopin showed that adsorption equilibrium is established in 20–30 minutes; adsorption of isomorphous ions does not depend on the charge of the adsorber surface when its solubility does not change. Correctly reproducible results of adsorption study and full reversibility of this process are achieved only if the adsorber surface remains unchanged throughout the experiment - if the adsorber solubility remains unchanged; in case of changes in the liquid phase composition or under other additional conditions, when the adsorber solubility changes, adsorption acquires a more complex character, which is accompanied by co-crystallization distorting the results. Studying the adsorption kinetics, a similar phenomenon was encountered by L. Imre. V. G. Khlopin gave a formula for determining the surface of crystalline precipitates by adsorption of an isomorphic ion on them and experimentally confirmed its applicability (V. G. Khlopin, M. S. Merkulova).

== Geochemistry of radioelements and noble gases ==
In this field, the following directions were developed in V. G. Khlopin's works: 1. radioelements migration, in particular - relatively short-lived in the Earth's crust; 2. study of radium-mesothorium containing waters; 3. Determination of geologic age on the basis of radioactive data; 4. distribution of helium and argon in natural gases of the country; 5. effects of natural waters in geochemistry of noble gases; 6. distribution of boron in natural waters.

=== Radioelements migration ===
The scientist was the first to draw attention to the special importance of studying the migration of relatively short-lived radioelements in the Earth's crust for solving general geological and geochemical problems (1926). V. G. Khlopin pointed out a number of questions of these disciplines, which imply solution by the proposed methods: determination of sequence in geological and geochemical processes, determination of absolute age of relatively young and very young geological formations, and a number of other thematic areas. Migrations of uranium and radium were subjected to experimental study.

=== Radioactive water studies ===
Extensive studies relating to the establishment of the presence of radium, uranium, and decay products of the thorium series in natural brines of the Soviet Union were carried out under the direction of V. G. Khlopin; numerous expeditions revealed a new form of accumulation in nature of radium and its isotopes in brine waters of the Na, Ca, and Cl types. The following of his students and colleagues participated in these studies: V. I. Baranov, L. V. Komlev, M. S. Merkulov, B. A. Nikitin, V. P. Savchenko, A. G. Samartseva, N. V. Tageev, and others.

=== Determination of geologic age by radiometric method ===
These works concern, on the one hand, consideration of the basics of the method and analysis of the nature of errors, and, on the other hand, experimental determination of the age of uranites from different pegmatite veins both by the uranium/lead ratio and by Lan's oxygen method, which was developed and refined in the works of V.G. Khlopin. The scientist supervised research in this direction in the Radium Institute - on helium and lead methods, which gave the determination of the geologic age of some formations. The work (with E. K. Gerling and E. M. Ioffe) on helium migration from minerals and rocks and the influence of the gas phase on this process should be attributed to this cycle.

=== Helium and argon distribution in natural gases of the USSR ===
V. G. Khlopin began to study the distribution of helium in freely emitting gases of the country in 1922-1923. In 1924, he and A. I. Lakashuk discovered helium in the gases of the Novouzensky district of Saratov province; and in the period from 1924 to 1936, V. G. Khlopin and his students (E. K. Gerling, G. M. Ermolina, B. A. Nikitin, I. E. Starik, P. I. Tolmachev, and others) analyzed many samples of natural gases and created a distribution map based on the data. For the first time a new type of gas jets in the Kokand area, called "air jets" and characteristic of wide mountain basins (1936), was identified.

=== Natural waters and geochemistry of noble gases ===
The works of the present direction were a direct consequence of the previous section, on the basis of which V.G. Khlopin came to the concept of continuous gas exchange between inner and outer gas atmospheres, about the role of natural waters, in a particular case - in the exchange of noble gases (excluding helium) between outer air and underground atmospheres. In accordance with these ideas in underground gas atmospheres there is a gradual enrichment of argon, krypton and xenon, - depletion of neon in relation to their content in the air. Relation

$\frac{Ar}{N_2}, \frac{Kr}{Ar}, \frac{Xe}{Kr}$

in underground atmospheres is greater than in air. It has been found that gases dissolved in the lower layers of deep natural reservoirs are sharply enriched with heavy noble gases.

=== Boron in natural waters ===
The beginning of this direction of geochemistry was the work on boron-acid springs in northwestern Persia and Transcaucasia; later these studies were extended to other areas of the USSR. It was found that boron is a typical element in the waters of oil-bearing areas, enriched in them. V.G. Khlopin also for the first time noted the need for prospecting boron-acid compounds in the Embinsky and Gurievsky counties of the Ural region, where much later the Inderskoye field was discovered.

== Analytical chemistry ==
V. G. Khlopin’s work in this area concerns gas, volumetric, gravimetric and colorimetric analysis.

Gas analysis. V. G. Khlopin developed instruments for rapid assessment of the amount of helium and neon in gas mixtures (V. G. Khlopin, E. K. Gerling, 1932). These devices have simplified the analysis of noble gases so much that they have made it possible to include it in the general method of gas analysis.

Volumetric analysis. For the first time in the USSR, V. G. Khlopin introduced the method of differential reduction and differential oxidation with the simultaneous determination of several cations in a mixture (1922) and experimentally mastered the simultaneous determination of vanadium, iron and uranium - volumetric methods for the determination of vanadium and uranium were proposed.

Gravimetric analysis. V. G. Khlopin developed a quantitative method for separating tetravalent uranium in the form UF_{4}NH_{4}F^{1}/_{2}H_{2}O from hexavalent uranium and trivalent and divalent iron.

Colorimetric analysis. Scientists have proposed a method for determining small amounts of iridium in the presence of platinum.

Under the leadership of V.G. Khlopin, several methods of analysis were also developed: a volumetric method for determining small amounts of boron, a volumetric method for determining $\ce{SO4^2-}$ and $\ce{Mg^2+}$, gravimetric methods for determining uranium, a colorimetric method for determining fluorine, and others.

== The Uranium Problem and the Atomic Project ==
In the process of studying natural radioactivity - studying the radiation of radioactive elements and radioactive transformations, new natural radioactive elements were discovered, systematized in radioactive groups - uranium and thorium, which include the third, so-called actinium family - actinides (this name was proposed by S. A. Shchukarev). F.Soddy's discovery of the law of radioactive displacements made it possible to assume that the final stable decay products of elements of all three families are three isotopes of the same element - lead.

The Bohr model of the atom is based on the study of natural radioactivity, which showed the complexity of the structure of the atom, the decay of which produces atoms of other elements, which is accompanied by three types of radiation: α, β и γ. The neutron-proton theory of the structure of the atomic nucleus owes its origin to the discovery of new elementary particles that make up the nucleus: the neutron (^{1}_{0}n) and the proton (^{1}_{1}p), which became possible by the artificial splitting of the atom under the influence of α-particles (1919): ^{14}_{7}N+^{4}_{2}He→^{17}_{8}O+^{1}_{1}H, accompanied by the release of a proton (soon experiments were carried out with a number of other light elements).

Further fundamental research in this area showed that in light elements the number of neutrons in the nucleus is equal to the number of protons; and as we move to heavy elements, neutrons begin to dominate over protons, and the nuclei become unstable - they become radioactive.

As part of the atomic project, he was a member of the technical council and was responsible for the activities of the radium institute. Through the efforts of V.G. Khlopin and the First Secretary of the Leningrad Regional Committee and City Committee of the All-Union Communist Party of Bolsheviks, Alexey Kuznetsov, the Radium Institute received additional premises. The decision to allocate space was made by the Special Committee in November 1945, carried out by the chairmen of the Operations Bureau of the Council of People's Commissars of the RSFSR A. N. Kosygin and the representative of the State Planning Committee in the Special Committee N. A. Borisov.

== Pedagogical, administrative, social and editorial activities ==
After graduating from St. Petersburg University, V. G. Khlopin was left at the department of Professor L. A. Chugaev, but while still a student, in 1911 he conducted a workshop on the chemical methods of sanitary analyzes with doctors at the St. Petersburg Clinical Institute, and continued this course of practical training in 1912 and 1913.

From 1917 to 1924, V. G. Khlopin served as an assistant in the department of general chemistry at the university, and from 1924, as an assistant professor, he began teaching a special course on radioactivity and the chemistry of radioelements - the first in the USSR; since brief and incomplete data and summaries existed only in foreign literature, this course was completely developed by V. G. Khlopin, who taught it until 1930, and resumed in 1934 as a professor, teaching it until 1935. In the spring of 1945, the scientist organized and headed the department of radiochemistry at Leningrad University.

Developed by V. G. Khlopin in collaboration with B. A. Nikitin and A. P. Ratner, a course of lectures on radiochemistry formed the basis of an extensive monograph on the chemistry of radioactive substances.

V. G. Khlopin took an active part in the work of the Russian Physical-Chemical Society, and after the latter was transformed into the All-Union Chemical Society, he was a member of the Council of the Leningrad branch of the organization, and later was its chairman.

At the Academy of Sciences, V. G. Khlopin was a member of the Analytical Commission, the Commission on Isotopes, and the Commission for the Development of the Scientific Heritage of D. I. Mendeleev. From 1941 to 1945, V. G. Khlopin, as Deputy Academician-Secretary, did a lot of work in the Department of Chemical Sciences of the USSR Academy of Sciences. During the Eastern Front (World War II), V. G. Khlopin served as deputy chairman of the Commission for the Mobilization of Resources of the Volga and Kama Region and chairman of its chemical section.

For many years he was a member of the Editorial Council of the Chemical-Technical Publishing House (Khimteoret). The scientist was the executive editor of the journal Uspekhi Khimii and was on the editorial boards of the journals: “Reports of the USSR Academy of Sciences”, “Izvestia of the USSR Academy of Sciences (Department of Chemical Sciences)”, “Journal of General Chemistry” and “Journal of Physical Chemistry”.

Vitaly Grigorievich Khlopin trained students in all the most important areas of scientific activity, many of whom became not only independent scientific researchers, but also the creators of their own scientific directions and schools.

== Awards and scientific recognition ==
- Hero of Socialist Labor (10/29/1949);
- three Orders of Lenin (10.6.1945; 21.3.1947; 29.10.1949);
- Stalin Prize of the third degree (1943) - for the development of a method for the industrial production of radiothorium
- Stalin Prize of the first degree (1946) - for scientific research in the field of chemistry of radioactive substances, the results of which are presented in the articles: “Radioactive methods for determining the absolute surface of crystalline suspensions”, “Adsorption of radium on lead sulfate”, “Transformation of elements and the periodic law” (1939 —1944)
- Stalin Prize, first degree (10/29/1949) - scientific director of the development of the technological process for separating plutonium from uranium metal at plant "B"
- Small Prize of D. I. Mendeleev for work on radium (1924);
- Honored Scientist of the RSFSR (1940);
- The first Mendeleev's reader (1941).

== Addresses in St. Petersburg ==
- 1922-1941, 1945-1950 - Roentgen street, 3;
- 1922-1941, 1945-1950 - Kamennoostrovsky Avenue, 23;
- 1908-1941, 1945-1949 - Universitetskaya embankment, 7;
- 1913-1941 - Bolshaya Zelenina street, 13;
- 1945-1950 - Lesnoy Avenue, 61 (House of Specialists).

== Memory ==
The following were named after V. G. Khlopin:

- By resolution of the Presidium of the USSR Academy of Sciences, the Radium Institute was named after V. G. Khlopin (1950).
- The V. G. Khlopin Prize was established for the best work in the field of radiochemistry (1950).
- Since 1970, the Radium Institute has held Khlopin readings on radiochemistry and the chemistry of rare elements.
- Khlopin Street - in the Kalininsky district since 1972, from Polytechnicheskaya to Gzhatskaya streets.
- Radium Institute named after. V. G. Khlopin - 2nd Murinsky Avenue, building 28;
- Radium Institute named after. V. G. Khlopin (historical building) - Roentgen Street, building 1 (for more information about this building, see the article Roentgen Street).

=== Memorial plaques ===
- Memorial plaque on the building of the Radium Institute
- A memorial plaque was installed on the building at 3 Roentgen Street in 1952 (architect Z. M. Vilensky).
- A memorial plaque was installed on the building at 23 Kamennoostrovsky Prospekt in 1990 (sculptor E. N. Rotanov, architect S. L. Mikhailov).
- In 1996, a memorial plaque was installed on the building at 7 Universitetskaya embankment with erroneous dates in the text: “In this building, from 1908 to 1949, the outstanding scientist, organizer of the nuclear industry, founder of the Department of Radiochemistry V. G. Khlopin studied and worked.” (In 1941-1945 he was evacuated to Kazan.)

In the 1950s, a memorial plaque was installed on the house at 61 Lesnoy Avenue with the text: “The outstanding Russian chemist Vitaly Grigorievich Khlopin lived in this house from 1945 to 1950.”
