= Rozetta Zhilina =

Soviet mathematician and computer scientist

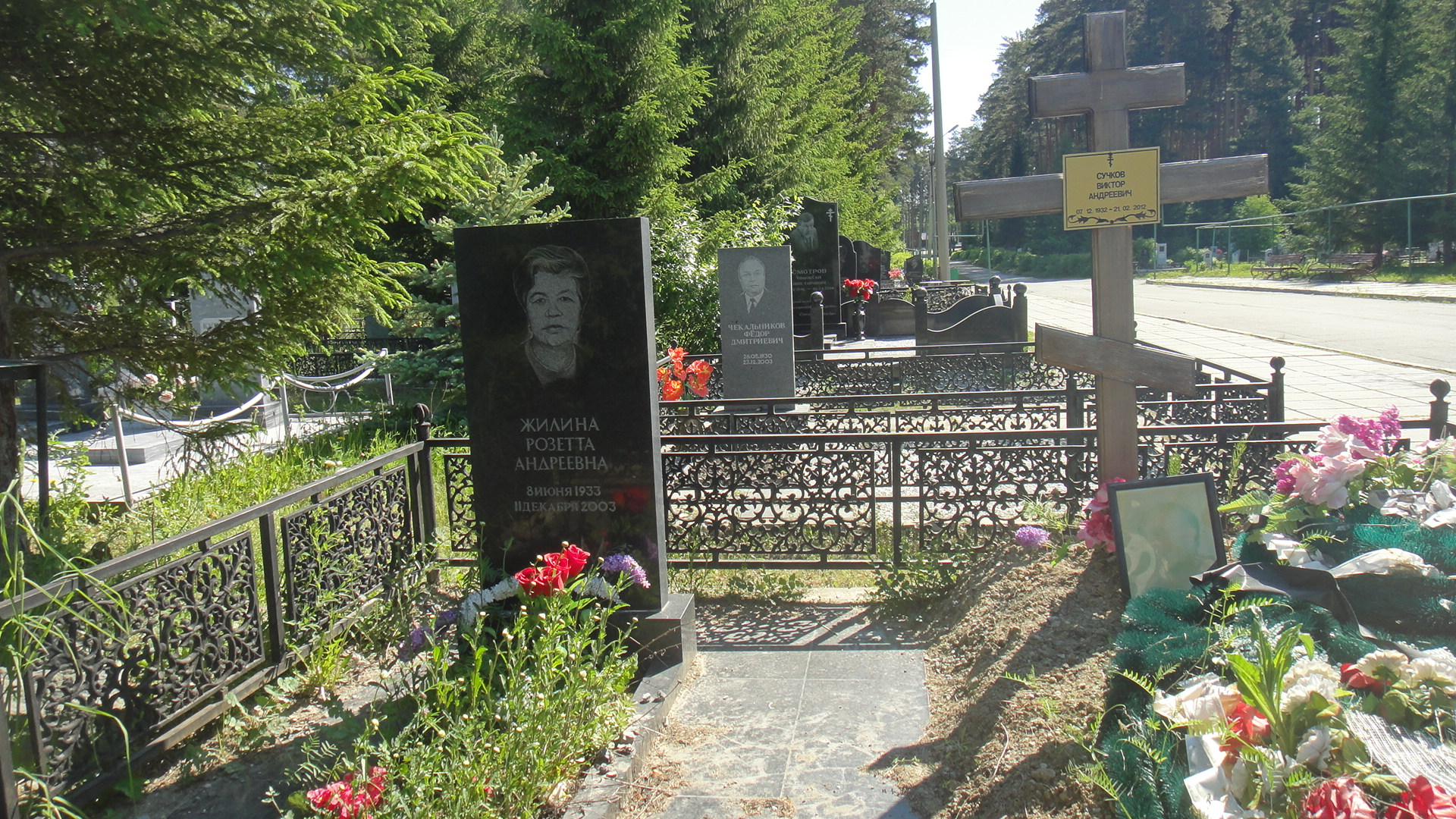
- Born: Rozetta Andreyevna Zhilina; 8 June 1933; Leningrad, Soviet Union
- Died: 11 December 2003 (aged 70); Snezhinsk, Russia
- Citizenship: Soviet
- Education: Leningrad State University
- Spouse: Viktor Suchkov
- Awards: USSR State Prize (1988)
- Scientific career
- Fields: Algorithms in ballistics

Rozetta Andreyevna Zhilina (Russian: Розе́тта Андре́евна Жи́лина; 8 June 1933, Leningrad – 11 December 2003, Snezhinsk) was a Soviet and Russian mathematician and computer scientist.

== Education ==
She graduated from the Mathematics and Mechanics department of the Leningrad State University in 1956, where one of her classmates was Anatoly Vershik.

== Career ==
She worked at the All-Russian Scientific Research Institute Of Technical Physics in the mathematical section.

After World War II, the Soviet Union began an ambitious program to develop their own computing technology, creating systems to rival those in the United States. Computer science research was often kept secret during the ongoing Cold War, but was seen as an important field nonetheless. From the 1960s to the 1980s, women represented half of the students in this area in Soviet universities and they later went on to work in the field, either as programmers or system designers.

Zhilina developed algorithms and computer programs for solving problems in physics, mechanics and the non-stationary thermal conductivity of complex nuclear weapons. Under her leadership, computer programs were developed to solve problems in the field of optimal trajectories of nuclear weapons, including their ballistics.

== Awards and honours ==
She was a laureate of the USSR State Prize (1988), the Medal "For Labour Valour" (1962) and the Order of the Red Banner of Labour (1975).

== Death ==
Zhilina died in Snezhinsk in 2003, and is interred in the town cemetery.
