= Alisa Aksyonova =

Soviet and Russian museum director (1931–2026)

- Алиса Аксёнова
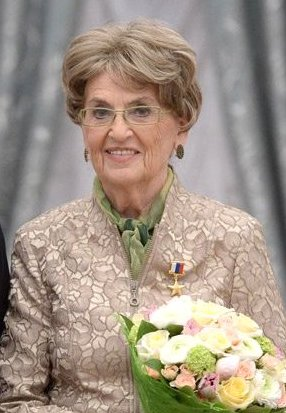
- Aksyonova in 2014
- Born: Alisa Ivanovna Kurnayeva; 13 March 1931; Savino, Shuysky District, Ivanovo Industrial Region, Russian SFSR, USSR
- Died: 1 October 2026 (aged 95); Vladimir, Russia
- Education: Moscow State Art and Cultural University
- Occupation: Museum director
- Years active: 1954–2018
- Children: 1
- Awards: Order of the Badge of Honour; Order of the Red Banner of Labour; Order of Friendship of Peoples; Order "For Merit to the Fatherland"; State Prize of the Russian Federation; Russian Federation Presidential Certificate of Honour; Hero of Labour of the Russian Federation; Order of Alexander Nevsky

Alisa Ivanovna Aksyonova (Russian: Алиса Ивановна Аксёнова; née Kurnayeva; 13 March 1931 – 1 October 2026) was a Soviet and Russian museum director who was the permanent director of the Vladimir-Suzdal Museum-Reserve between 1960 and 2010 and served as its director-general (2010 to 2013). She was vice-president of the Committee of Regional Museums between 1980 and 1988 and was the vice-president of the Russian Committee of the International Council of Museums from 1988 to 1996. Aksyonova served as a full-time Staff Cultural Advisor to Svetlana Orlova, the Governor of Vladimir Oblast, in January 2014. She has received multiple awards for her work such as the Order of the Badge of Honour; the Order of the Red Banner of Labour; the Order of Friendship of Peoples; the Order "For Merit to the Fatherland"; the State Prize of the Russian Federation; the Russian Federation Presidential Certificate of Honour; the Hero of Labour of the Russian Federation and the Order of Alexander Nevsky.

== Early life ==
On 13 March 1931, Aksyonova was born the daughter of Kupriyanov Ivan Timofeevich and his wife in Savino, Shuysky District, Ivanovo Industrial Region (today the regional centre of the Savinsky District in the Ivanovo Oblast). When she was seven years old, she and her family relocated to the city of Vladimir in 1938, studying at school in the city. Aksyonova passed her university entry examination in 1949, and graduated from the library department of the Moscow State Library Institute named after V.M. Molotov (today the Moscow State Art and Cultural University) with a diploma with honours five years later.

== Career ==
Aksyonova returned to Vladimir and she was assigned employment at the local library before she was elected to the role of assistant secretary of the local Komsomol branch. In 1959, Aksyonova worked in the local Vladimir history museum for one year. She was permanent director of the Vladimir-Suzdal Museum-Reserve between 4 January 1960 and 16 June 2010 and served as its director-general from 18 June 2010 to 26 July 2013, surviving five attempts to remove her from the post. Aksyonova served as vice-president of the Committee of Regional Museums between 1980 and 1988 and was the vice-president of the Russian Committee of the International Council of Museums from 1988 to 1996. She was a member of the Presidium of the Russian Committee of the International Council of Museums. In January 2014, Aksyonova was appointed to serve as a full-time Staff Cultural Advisor to Svetlana Orlova, the Governor of Vladimir Oblast.

She worked to construct a boiler house and "propaganda of the achievements of Soviet culture, science and technology" on the request of the regional committee of the Communist Party of the Soviet Union to the museum. The museum collected extra funds multiple times when abandoned churches, estates and villages were examined under Aksyonova's leadership. Her guidance saw the museum create expositions such as the Museum of Amateur Creativity of the Peoples of the RSFSR, "Golden Pantry", "Book Treasures of Six Centuries", "Prisoners of the Monastery Prison", "D.M. Pozharsky is a national hero of Russia" and others in the restored monuments of the ensemble of the Monastery of Saint Euthymius in Suzdal. The museum transferred 17 religious buildings to various confessions to preserve their condition and restored to their original states and Aksyonova agreed to a compromise in the church and museum's best interests. She sacked half of the museum's employees and replaced them with young specialists and did not permit the privatisation of one single architectural structure during the era of Perestroika.

From 1998, Aksyonova secured stable funding as a result of the inclusion of the museum in the Particularly Valuable Objects of the Cultural Heritage of the Peoples of Russia that saw large-scale restoration work and the carrying out of several museum projects such as the Suzdal branch having an apothecary garden recreated to revive the traditions of monastic gardening. The Bishop's Chambers in the Suzdal branch saw an overhaul of its primary historical exposition and the first exposition of ancient Russian art was opened. Aksyonova saw the museum include architectural monuments which include 55 architectural monuments of Vladimir, Suzdal and Gus-Khrustalny as well as two ensembles and eight white-stone monuments on the UNESCO World Heritage List. She was the author of the books such as History. Fate. Museum in 2001, Suzdal. XX century in 2002 and Suzdal. XX century. From the history of the city-museum and the museum-reserve. Monograph in 2004. Aksyonova received a Candidate of Sciences degree in 2003.

== Personal life and death ==
Aksyonova was married, and had one child. She was fluent in French and enjoyed classical music, gardening and travelling.

Aksyonova died on 1 October 2026, at the age of 95.

== Awards ==
Aksyonova was decorated 33 times throughout her career. In 1962, Aksyonova received the VDNKh Silver Medal, the Order of the Badge of Honour in 1971 and the Order of the Red Banner of Labour in 1976. She was decorated with the State Prize of the RSFSR in the field of architecture "for the restoration of historical and cultural monuments of the cities of Vladimir and Suzdal, the creation of museum expositions and their widespread use for cultural, educational and tourist purposes" in 1977. Aksyonova was made a Honoured Cultural Worker of the RSFSR on 26 May 1980 "for services in the field of Soviet culture", and the Order of Friendship of Peoples in 1986.

She got the Order "For Merit to the Fatherland", Fourth Class from Boris Yeltsin, the President of Russia, "for services to the state and a great contribution to the development of domestic museum business" on 17 March 1997. New President Vladimir Putin conferred on Aksyonova the State Prize of the Russian Federation "for the preservation and revival of cultural heritage, the creative development of museum work" on 9 June 2000. That 30 September, she received the Russian President's Prize in the field of education "for the creation of the children's museum center of the State Vladimir-Suzdal Historical, Architectural and Art Museum-Reserve for institutions of additional education."

On 18 January 2007, Akysonova was upgraded to the Order "For Merit to the Fatherland", Third Class "for her great contribution to the development of museum work and the preservation of the national historical and cultural heritage." She was conferred the Russian Federation Presidential Certificate of Honour "for merits in the field of culture and many years of fruitful work" on 2 June 2010. Aksyonova was made a Hero of Labour of the Russian Federation by Putin on 20 April 2014 "for special labor services to the state and people." She was given the Medal "For Services to the Vladimir Region" in 2017 "for a great contribution to the socio-economic development of the region", and the Order of Alexander Nevsky on 3 October 2021 "for labor achievements and many years of conscientious work."

Aksyonova was made an Honorary citizen of Vladimir by the executive committee of the Vladimir City Council of People's Deputies on 11 March 1996 "for her great contribution to the development of the city's culture, to the restoration, museumification and promotion of architectural monuments." She was made an Honorary Citizen of the Vladimir Oblast on 25 August 2004 and Suzdal on 21 February 2006. Aksyonova has also received medals from Bulgaria and Czechoslovakia.
