= Vladimir Neuvazhaev =

Soviet physicist

- Владимир Емельянович Неуважаев
- Born: Vladimir Emelyanovich Neuvazhaev; June 30, 1935 (age 91); Novodzherelievskaya, Bryukhovetsky District, Krasnodar Krai, Russian Soviet Federative Socialist Republic, Soviet Union
- Education: Rostov State University (1956)
- Awards: Order of Friendship of Peoples, USSR State Prize, Honored Scientist of the Russian Federation

Vladimir Emelyanovich Neuvazhaev was born in 1935. He is a Soviet and Russian specialist in the field of computational mathematics, Doctor of Physics and Mathematics (1972), professor (1989), USSR State Prize Laureate (1972), and Honored Scientist of the Russian Federation (2006).

== Biography ==
Neuvazhaev was born on June 30, 1935, in the village of Novodzherelievskaya, Bryukhovetsky District, of Krasnodar territory.

In 1956, after graduating from the Faculty of Physics and Mathematics at Rostov State University, he worked in the system of the USSR MSM. In 1956, he was sent to the closed city Chelyabinsk-70 to the All-Russian Scientific Research Institute Of Technical Physics with the appointment of engineer. In 1959, he became senior engineer and group leader, since 1965 - head of department. In 1971, he became Deputy Head of the Mathematical Department for Science at VNIITF.

In 1963, he defended his academic degree Candidate of Physical and Mathematical Sciences; in 1986 - Doctor of Physics and Mathematics. In 1996, Chief Researcher of VNIITF, Neuvazhaev's main scientific interests were related to the development of new numerical methods for solving complex problems in continuum mechanics, mathematical modeling processes of occurrence and development of hydrodynamic stability and turbulence in flows of stratified gases and liquids.

In 1993, he was a professor at the Department of Computational Mathematics at Chelyabinsk State University and at the Snezhinsk Academy of Physics and Technology. In 1995, he became Academician of the International Informatization Academy. In 1979, he became a member of the editorial board of the Scientific and Technical Collection "Problems of Atomic Science and Technology" (VANT) from the series "Mathematical Modeling of Physical Processes."

== Publications ==
- V. E. Neuvazhaev, Gas vacuum exhaustion under power supply law, Academy of Sciences, USSR, 141:5 (1961), 1058–1060
- V. E. Neuvazhaev, On the theory of turbulent mixing, Academy of Sciences, USSR, 222:5 (1975), 1053–1056
- V. E. Neuvazhaev, V. G. Yakovlev, “Turbulent mixing of the interface in the numerical gas-dynamic calculation,” 440–450 mathnet zmath; U.S.S.R. Comput. Math. Math. Phys., 16:2 (1976), 154–165
- V. E. Neuvazhaev, Features of a turbulent mixing model based on the two-component model with different velocities of each component. Separation addition to diffusion models, 7:7 (1995), 3–18

== Awards ==
- Order of Friendship of Peoples (1985)
- USSR State Prize (1972)
- Honored Scientist of the Russian Federation (2006)
