= Kobzon =

Kobzon may refer to:

- Joseph Kobzon (1937-2018), Soviet and Russian singer.
- (3399 Kobzon), a minor planet named after the singer.
