= Mikhail Bibikin =

Soviet design engineer

- Born: Mikhail Aleksandrovich Bibikin; January 12, 1914; Burtsevo, Bogorodsky District, Nizhny Novgorod Oblast, Nizhny Novgorod Governorate, Russian Empire
- Died: March 7, 1980 (aged 66)
- Citizenship: Russia; Soviet Union
- Education: Nizhny Novgorod State Technical University
- Awards: Order of Lenin, Order of the Red Banner of Labour, Order of the Red Star, Medal "For Valiant Labour in the Great Patriotic War 1941–1945", USSR State Prize
- Scientific career
- Workplaces: All-Russian Scientific Research Institute of Experimental Physics, All-Russian Scientific Research Institute Of Technical Physics

Mikhail Aleksandrovich Bibikin (1914 – 1980) was a Soviet design engineer, a specialist in the development of nuclear weapons, and a USSR State Prize Laureate (1971).

== Biography ==
Bibikin was born on 12 January 1914 in the village of Burtsevo, Bogorodsky District, Nizhny Novgorod Oblast, Nizhny Novgorod Governorate to a peasant family.

In 1937, after graduating from Gorky Industrial Institute, he worked as an engineer at Kolomna Machine Building Plant. He served in the Red Army from 1937 to 1939. In 1939, he became a design engineer at Plant No. 92 and at the NKV USSR. In 1944, he was design engineer and leading designer at Leningrad plant "Bolshevik". In 1944, he was awarded the Order of the Red Star for his merits in the development of new types of artillery weapons.

In 1949, after graduating from the Leningrad School of Management Training of the USSR Ministry of State Security, he was appointed deputy head of the Poltava Oblast with the USSR Ministry of State Security. In 1952, he worked in the First Main Directorate under the USSR Council of Ministers. In 1952, he was sent to the closed city Arzamas-16, where he worked as a senior engineer, head of the design group and deputy head of the sector at VNIIEF.

In 1956, he was sent to the closed city Chelyabinsk-70 to the All-Union Scientific Research Institute of Technical Physics. From 1956 to 1960 he was head of the design department of operational equipment (Department-92) and at the same time he was deputy head of Sector-9 (NIO-9 - operation and control systems for nuclear weapons and ammunitions development, flight and ground tests). In 1961, he was head of Department-72 (nuclear weapons and nuclear ammunition development for the Soviet Navy and the USSR Strategic Missile Forces). From 1965 to 1979, Bibikin was the head of Sector-7 (NKO-7 - "development of structures and circuitry of nuclear warheads and nuclear ammunition, operational equipment and accessories") and the deputy chief designer of VNIITF. Under the leadership of M.A. Bibikin and with his direct participation, a number of special new military equipment products were developed, tested and transferred into mass production.

Bibikin died on 7 March 1980 in the city Chelyabinsk-70.

== Awards ==
=== Orders ===
- Order of Lenin (1975)
- Order of the Red Banner of Labour (1969)
- Order of the Red Star (1944)

=== Medals ===
- Medal "For Valiant Labour in the Great Patriotic War 1941–1945" (1945)

=== Prizes ===
- USSR State Prize (1971)
