= Danylenko =

Danylenko or Danilenko (Ukrainian: Даниленко, Russian: Даниле́нко) is a Ukrainian-language surname. Notable people with this surname include:

- Anatoliy Danylenko (1953–2021), Ukrainian politician
- Artyom Danilenko (born 1990), Russian footballer
- Dana Danilenko (born 2001), Israeli badminton player
- Danylo Danylenko (born 1994), Ukrainian athlete
- Dmitriy Danilenko (born 1995), Russian fencer
- Dmytro Danylenko (born 1999), Ukrainian sprint canoeist
- Tetyana Danylenko (born 1983), Ukrainian journalist
- Viktoriia Danilenko (born 1994), Russian gymnast
- Vladimir Danilenko (born 1999), Russian Paralympic swimmer
- Vyacheslav Danilenko (born 1935), Soviet scientist
