= Zhilin =

Zhilin (Russian: Жилин), feminine: Zhilina is a Russian patronymic surname derived from the nickname Zhila. Its Ukrainian counterpart is Zhylin (Жилін). It is associated with Russian noble Zhilin families. Notable people with the surname include:

- Aleksey Zhilin (c. 1766–1848), Russian composer
- Gennady Zhilin
- Ilya Zhilin (born 1985), Russian volleyball player
- Nikolai Zhilin (born 1992), Russian ice hockey player
- Rozetta Zhilina
- Vasily Zhilin (1915–1947), Soviet and Russian soldier
- Veronika Zhilina
