= Vyacheslav Danilenko =

Russian-born, former Soviet scientist

- Born: 1935 (age 90–91); Soviet Union
- Citizenship: Ukraine
- Education: Leningrad Polytechnic Institute
- Known for: Detonation nanodiamond Soviet atomic bomb project Nuclear program of Iran
- Scientific career
- Fields: Physics
- Workplaces: VNIITF

V'yacheslav Vasilovich Danilenko (Ukrainian: Выячеслав Васильович Даниленко; born January 10, 1935) is a Ukrainian physicist who specializes in the nanodiamonds, which he gained expertise during his time in the former Soviet program of nuclear weapons.

In 2011, the IAEA investigators and the investigative report by the Washington Post leveled serious allegations on him as a "foreign expert" and accused him of being a central figure in the nuclear program of Iran after the Soviet collapse in 1991.

== Soviet Union ==
From 1955 until 1991, Danilenko worked as a physicist in the former Soviet program of nuclear weapons, where he was based in the NII-1011 facility which is located in the closed city of Chelyabinsk-70. His initial work was focused on Nanodiamond that were produced from detonation of former Soviet nuclear devices in the Semipalatinsk Test Site in Kazakhstan. He later gained expertise in the Detonation nanodiamond–a technology developed from the former Soviet program that improved the detonation process.

== Post-Soviet years ==
=== Ukraine ===
After the Soviet dissolution, he moved to Kyiv in Ukraine, where he ran a private company called ALIT, which was known for producing diamonds. In 2004, he authored a paper on nanodiamonds.

=== Iran ===
In 2011 the Washington Post released an article alleging that he provided expertise in the development of nuclear detonators for the country at their Physics Research Centre between 1996 and 2002, and cited a report published by the International Atomic Energy Agency.
