= Georgy Lominsky =

Soviet general and nuclear weapons researcher (1918-1988)

- Born: Georgy Pavlovich Lominsky; April 23, 1918; Koziatyn, Ukraine
- Died: June 17, 1988 (aged 70) Moscow, Soviet Union
- Buried: Kuntsevo Cemetery
- Allegiance: Soviet Union
- Branch: Soviet Air Forces
- Service years: 1938—1988
- Rank: Lieutenant General
- Commands: Director of All-Russian Scientific Research Institute Of Technical Physics

Georgy Pavlovich Lominsky (Russian: Георгий Павлович Ломинский; April 23, 1918 – June 17, 1988) was a Soviet organizer, and a leader of research and development work in the field of nuclear weapons in Snezhinsk. He was a lieutenant general and a Lenin Prize Laureate (1962).

== Biography ==
He was born into the family of a railroad worker - his father, Pavel Vasilyevich, worked as a conductor. His mother, Varvara Mironovna, was a housewife. In addition to Georgy, the family had three daughters Yelena, Leonida, and Maria. His mother died early from tuberculosis in 1931.

In 1935, he graduated from high school in the city of Koziatyn. From 1935 to 1938 he was a mechanical engineering student at Kyiv Industrial Institute.

Lominsky served in the military since October 15, 1938. From 1938 to May 1941, he was a student at Peter the Great Military Academy of the Strategic Missile Forces. He graduated with honors from the Academy in May 1941 with the qualification: military mechanical engineer.

As an excellent student, he attended a government reception, where Joseph Stalin gave his May 5, 1941 speech.

From May 1941 to January 1948 he served at the scientific research testing range of small arms and mortar weapons of the GAU VS (Shchurovo, Moscow Region, and from October 1941 to May 1942 during the evacuation of the Chebarkul District of the Chelyabinsk Region) as engineer, head of department, and head of the grenade and mortar department. Lominsky participated in the testing and development of military weapons, and developed the RPG-1. He served as an expert in small arms. He partially lost his hearing. He was wounded as a result of explosions of ammunition, which left fragments of a grenade in his legs for the rest of his life.

From February 1, 1948 to April 1955 at the KB-11, Lominsky was senior engineer, researcher, head of the test department, deputy head of the sector, and assistant director for technical safety. He participated in the tests of the first Russian atomic bomb on August 29, 1949. He served as supervisor of the design compliance team for structures and equipment at the test site, as well as for the delivery of a nuclear charge from the assembly shop to the test site. He participated in the test of the first thermonuclear bomb on August 12, 1953.

From April 1955 to June 1988 he worked at RFNC-VNIITF. He was Chief Engineer, Deputy Chief Designer, and then First Deputy Director. From November 20, 1964 to June 17, 1988 he was Director of the institute. At this time, VNIITF had an unofficial name - "Lominsky's economy": he took an active part in the development and testing of the institute's products, in the organization and development of the production base, and in the construction of housing and social facilities. He personally participated in all important events of the institute.

He died after a heart attack and was buried in Moscow at Kuntsevo Cemetery.

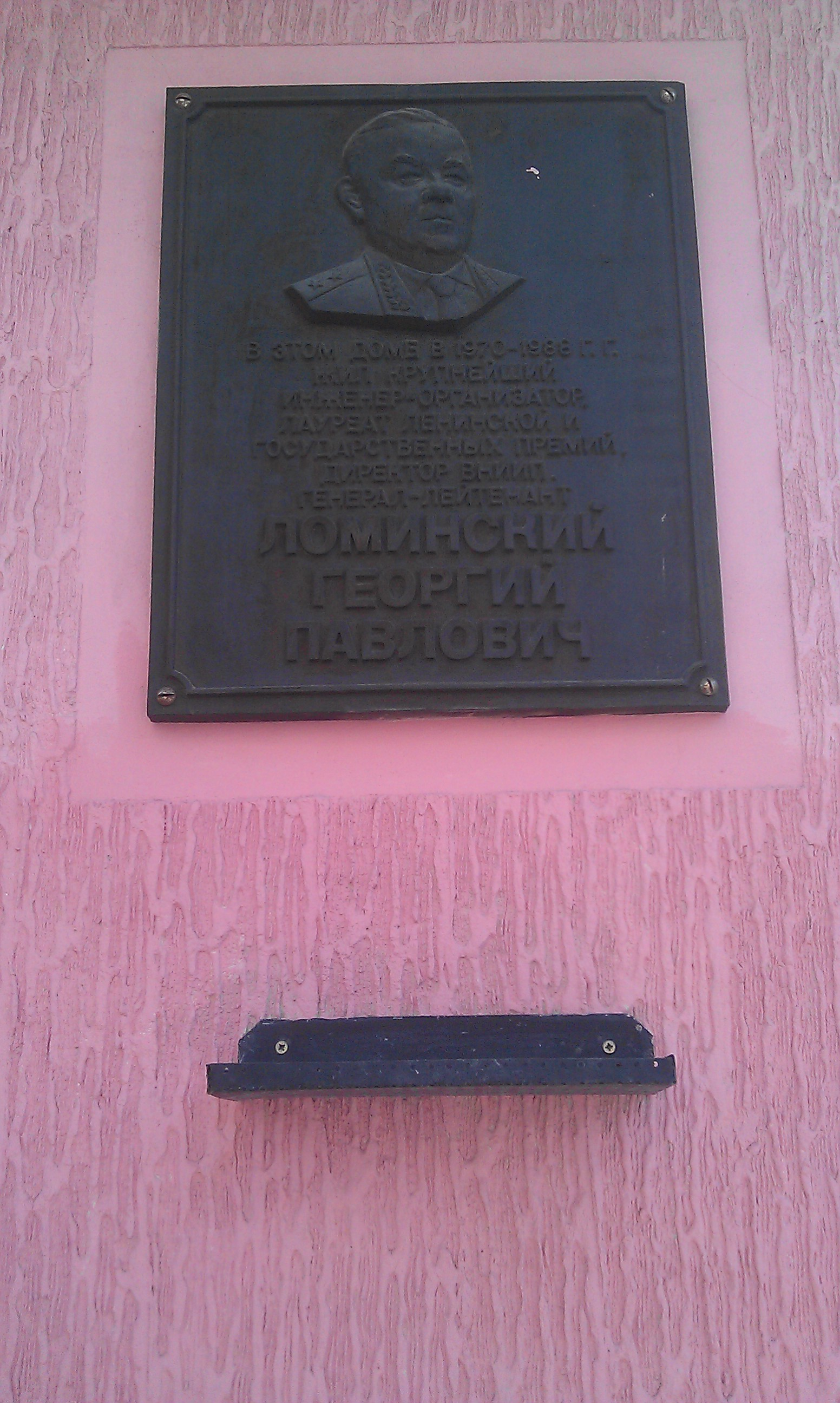
Memorial plaque to Lominsky in Snezhinsk

== Quote ==
"Рыба ищет где глубже, а человек — где рыба.
Если не наказан — значит поощрён."

"The fish is looking for where it is deeper, and the person - where it is better.
If it is not punished - it is forgiven."

== Incident ==
In the 1970s, an explosion occurred in one of the carriages at the freight station of Sverdlovsk, present-day Yekaterinburg, as a result of which several buildings were destroyed. Legend has it that, having received a message about the incident, the secretary of the Sverdlovsk regional committee of the CPSU called G.P. Lominsky and asked if he was the owner of the product that destroyed the freight station in Sverdlovsk. Georgy Pavlovich asked where the caller was speaking from, and when he received the answer: “from the regional committee,” he answered not without dark humor: “No, this is not our product. If ours worked, there would be no regional committee or Sverdlovsk."

== Awards ==
=== Prizes ===
- Lenin Prize (1962)
- Stalin Prize (1951)
- USSR State Prize (1978)

=== Orders ===
- Order of Lenin (1950, 1966)
- Order of the October Revolution (1971)
- Order of the Red Banner of Labour (1951, 1953, 1961)
- Order of the Red Star (1944, 1978)
