= Georgy Rykovanov =

Soviet physicist

- Георгий Рыкованов
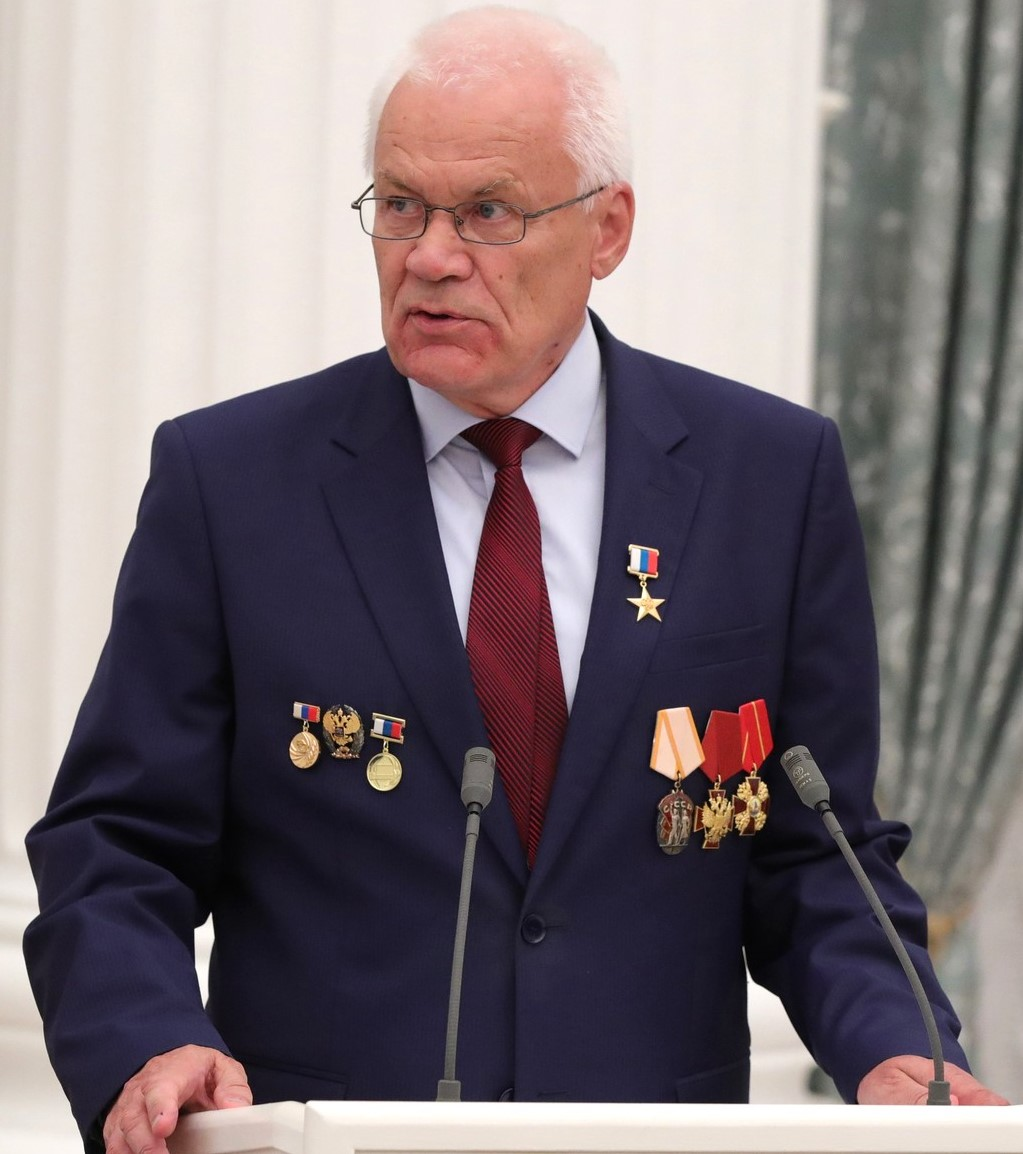
- Rykovanov in 2020
- Born: February 9, 1954 (age 72); Vologda
- Education: MEPhI
- Awards: Hero of Labour of the Russian Federation, Order "For Merit to the Fatherland", Order of Alexander Nevsky, Order of the Badge of Honour, State Prize of the Russian Federation, State Prize of the Russian Federation, Government awards of the Russian Federation

Georgy Nikolaevich Rykovanov (born February 9, 1954) – is a Soviet and Russian nuclear physicist, an organizer of science, a Doctor of Physics and Mathematics (1998), an Academician of the Russian Academy of Sciences (2011), and a Hero of Labor of the Russian Federation (2020).

== Biography ==
In 1969, Rykovanov entered the specialized boarding school # 45 at Leningrad State University, and in 1971 he graduated. In 1977 he graduated from Moscow Engineering Physics Institute.

In 1977, he began working at the All-Union Scientific Research Institute of Technical Physics (now RFNC-VNIITF named after Academician E. I. Zababakhin). In 1995, he became the head of the theoretical department; in 1996 – deputy scientific advisor and head of the theoretical department; in 1998 – first deputy director, first deputy scientific supervisor and head of the theoretical department. From 1998 to 2012 he was Director of RFNC-VNIITF (dismissed at his own request.) Beginning May 31, 2012, his title was Scientific Director of RFNC-VNIITF.

He is the author of over 350 scientific papers. His scientific interests are in the field of nuclear energy and the development of nuclear weapons, proceedings on hydrodynamics, turbulence, detonation, physics of thermonuclear fusion, physics of high energy densities, extreme states of matter, and the development of laser and optoelectronic systems. He proposed an empirical model of the kinetics of detonation of low-sensitivity explosives. He is a participant in the development of nuclear production prototypes in service with the Russian Armed Forces.

In 2003, he was elected a corresponding member of the Russian Academy of Sciences in the Department of Energy, Mechanical Engineering, Mechanics and Control Processes of RAS. In 2011, he was elected a full member of the Russian Academy of Sciences.

== Awards ==
- 2020 – Hero of Labour of the Russian Federation
- 2005 – Order "For Merit to the Fatherland" IV class
- 2015 – Order of Alexander Nevsky
- 1985 – Order of the Badge of Honour
- 2002, 2009 – State Prize of the Russian Federation
- 2018 – Honorary Citizen of the Chelyabinsk Region
