= President of Russia =

Head of state

President of the Russian Federation
- Президент Российской Федерации
- Presidential emblem

- Presidential standard

- Incumbent; Vladimir Putin since 7 May 2012
- Presidential Administration of Russia
- Style: Mr President (informal); Comrade Supreme Commander (military); His Excellency (diplomatic)
- Type: Head of state Supreme commander-in-chief
- Member of: State Council; Security Council; Supreme Eurasian Economic Council
- Residence: Moscow Kremlin (official); Novo-Ogaryovo (residential)
- Seat: Kremlin Senate
- Appointer: Direct popular vote
- Term length: Six years, renewable once
- Constituting instrument: Constitution of Russia (1993)
- Precursor: Chairman of the Supreme Soviet of the Russian SFSR
- Formation: Passage of presidency law: 24 April 1991; 35 years ago; Constitutional amendments: 24 May 1991; 35 years ago; First inauguration: 10 July 1991; 35 years ago; Modern status defined: 12 December 1993; 32 years ago
- First holder: Boris Yeltsin
- Deputy: Prime Minister
- Salary: 8,900,000₽ or US$100,000 per annum est.
- Website: президент.рф (in Russian) eng.kremlin.ru (in English)

The president of Russia, (Note: Russian: Президент России, romanized: Prezident Rossii) officially the president of the Russian Federation, (Note: Russian: Президент Российской Федерации, romanized: Prezident Rossiyskoy Federatsii) is the head of state of Russia. The president is the chair of the Federal State Council and the supreme commander-in-chief of the Russian Armed Forces. The current president is Vladimir Putin, who has been the de facto leader of the federation since 1999.

The modern incarnation of the office emerged from the president of the Russian Soviet Federative Socialist Republic (RSFSR). In 1991, Boris Yeltsin was elected president of the RSFSR, becoming the first non-Communist Party member to be elected into a major Soviet political role. He played a crucial role in the dissolution of the Soviet Union which saw the transformation of the RSFSR into the Russian Federation. Following a series of scandals and doubts about his leadership, violence erupted across Moscow in the 1993 Russian constitutional crisis. As a result, a new constitution was implemented and the 1993 Russian Constitution remains in force today.

The constitution establishes Russia as a semi-presidential system which separates the president of Russia from the government of Russia which exercises executive power. The powers of the presidency include: execution of federal law, appointing federal ministers, and members of the judiciary, and negotiating treaties with foreign powers. The president also has the power to grant federal pardons and reprieves, and to convene and adjourn the Federal Assembly under extraordinary circumstances. The president also appoints the prime minister, who directs domestic policy of the Russian Federation alongside the president. In all cases where the president of the Russian Federation is unable to fulfill their duties, those duties shall be temporarily delegated to the prime minister of Russia, who becomes acting president of Russia.

The president is elected directly through a popular vote to a six-year term. Previously, the Constitution established a term limit for the presidency restricting the officeholder to serve no more than two consecutive terms. However, this limitation has since been overhauled in large part due to the constitutional amendments that were ratified in 2020. One of the amendments passed reset the terms of both Vladimir Putin and Dmitry Medvedev, allowing either to serve as president for a full two terms regardless of their previous terms. In all, three individuals have served four presidencies spanning six full terms. In May 2012, Vladimir Putin became the fourth president; he was re-elected in March 2018 and in March 2024 for two consecutive six-year terms.

== History ==
After the fall of monarchy in 1917, the All-Russian Constituent Assembly, elected later that year, planned on establishing a democratic presidential or semi-presidential federal republic, proclaiming the Russian Democratic Federal Republic (RDFR) in January 1918. The president of the RDFR would have been the head of state, elected for a one-year term by a majority vote in parliament involving the deputies of both chambers. Due to the dissolution of the assembly by the Bolsheviks and establishment of their one-party dictatorship, no person was ever elected to this office.

Boris Yeltsin came to power with a wave of high expectations not long before the Soviet Union's collapse. In May 1990, he was elected as chairman of the Supreme Soviet (parliament) of the Russian Soviet Federative Socialist Republic (SFSR) – the highest state office – and thus became the head of state. As a result of the creation of the post of President of the Soviet Union, the Union republics also began to introduce the post of President. To do this, a referendum was held in the Russian SFSR, in which 71% of voters voted for the creation of the post of President, elected in direct elections. On 12 June 1991 Yeltsin was elected president of the Russian SFSR with 57% of the vote, becoming the first popularly elected president. However, Yeltsin never recovered his popularity after a series of economic and political crises in Russia in the 1990s. The Yeltsin era was marked by widespread corruption, economic collapse, and enormous political and social problems. By the time he left office, Yeltsin had an approval rating of two percent by some estimates.

Throughout his presidential terms and into his second term as the prime minister, Vladimir Putin has enjoyed high approval ratings amongst the Russian public. During his eight years in office, the Russian economy bounced back from crisis, seeing the country's GDP increase sixfold (72% in PPP), poverty cut more than half and average monthly salaries increase from $80 to $640, or by 150% in real rates. At the same time, his conduct in office has been questioned by domestic dissenters, as well as foreign governments and human rights organizations, for his handling of internal conflicts in Chechnya and Dagestan, his record on internal human rights and freedoms, his relations with former Soviet republics, and his relations with the so-called oligarchs: Russian businessmen with a high degree of power and influence within both the Russian government and economy. This was seen by the Kremlin as a series of anti-Russian propaganda attacks orchestrated by western opponents and exiled oligarchs.

Medvedev was appointed as first deputy prime minister on 14 November 2005. Formerly Vladimir Putin's chief of staff, he was also the chairman of Gazprom's board of directors, a post he had held, for the second time, since 2000. On 10 December 2007, he was informally endorsed as a candidate for the forthcoming presidential elections by the most prominent Russian political party, United Russia, and officially endorsed on 17 December 2007. Medvedev's candidacy was supported by outgoing president Vladimir Putin and pro-presidential parties. As technocrat and political appointee, Medvedev – Putin's former chief of staff and one-time rival to Sergey Ivanov – had never held elective office before 2009. Medvedev chose Putin as his prime minister; in 2012, Putin ran for the presidency, won, and appointed Medvedev as prime minister.

== Selection process ==
=== Eligibility ===
A presidential candidate must be a citizen of the Russian Federation who is at least 35 years old, has permanently resided in Russia for at least 25 years and does not have and has never previously had foreign citizenship or a foreign residence permit. Following constitutional amendments in 2020, the requirement of permanent residence in Russia increased from 10 years to 25 years and a new requirement preventing a presidential candidate from ever having foreign citizenship or a foreign residence permit was introduced.

The Russian constitution limits the number of terms a president can serve to two terms. Previously, the constitution only limited the president to two consecutive terms, allowing a former president to seek re-election after sitting out one complete term. However, following constitutional changes in 2020, this was changed to two terms overall, allowing the incumbent president and former presidents to serve two more terms.

=== Election ===
The election of the president is mainly regulated by the Presidential Election Law (PEL) and the Basic Guarantees of Electoral Rights (BGL). The Federation Council calls the presidential elections. If it does not call a presidential election that is due, the Central Election Commission will call the presidential election. The election day is the second Sunday of the month and the presidential electoral constituency is the territory of the Russian Federation as a whole. Each faction in the State Duma, the lower house of the Russian parliament has the right to nominate a candidate for the presidential elections. The minimum number of signatures for a presidential candidate fielded by a political party with no parliamentary representation is 100,000, down from 2 million before amendments to the law.

Terms were extended from four to six years in 2008, during Dmitry Medvedev's administration. The president is elected in a two-round system every six years, with a two consecutive term limitation. If no candidate wins by an absolute majority in the first round, a second election round is held between two candidates with the most votes. The last presidential election was in 2024, and the next is in 2030.

=== Inauguration ===
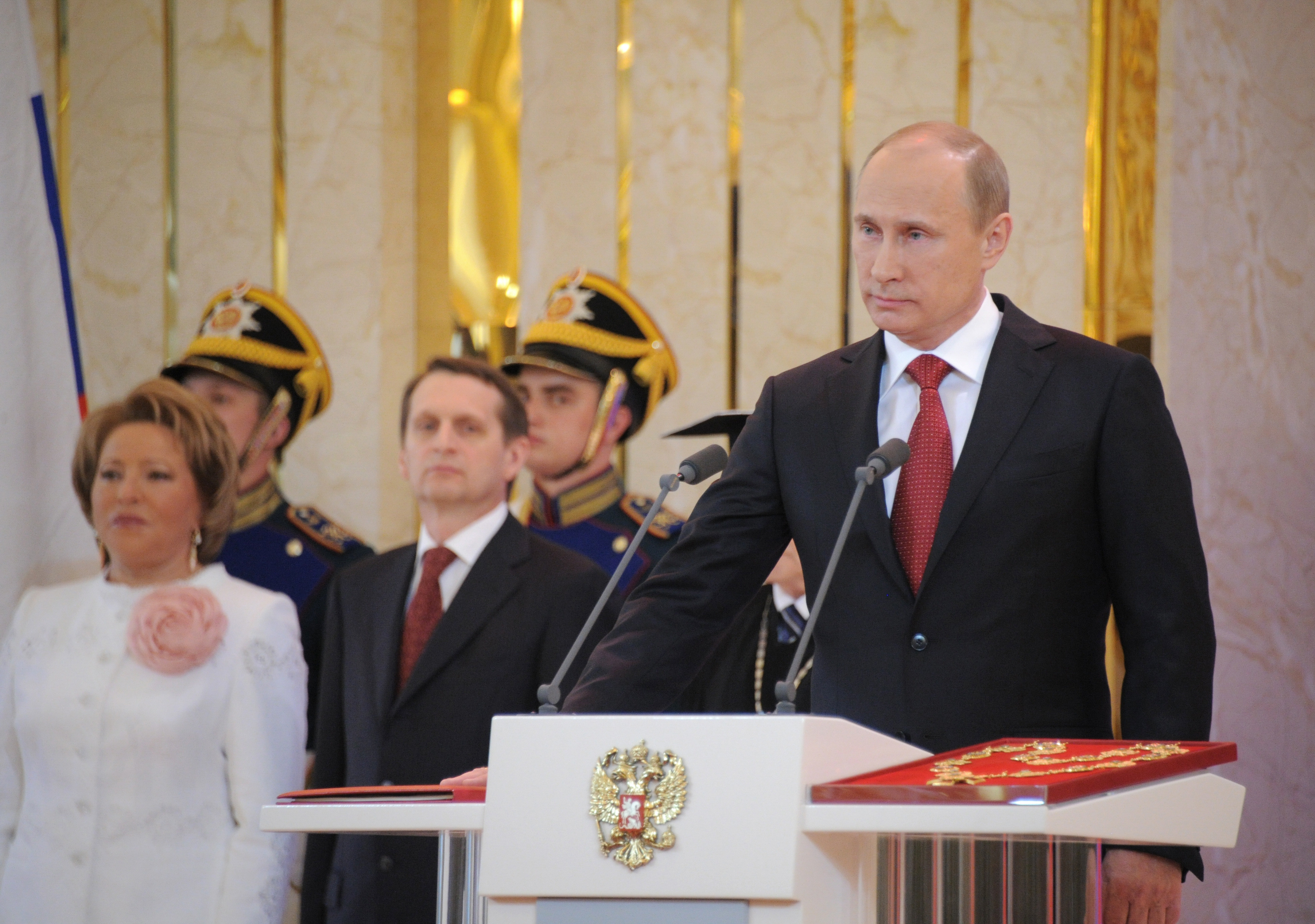
Vladimir Putin takes the presidential oath in 2012.

The inauguration of the president of Russia is conducted six years after the previous inauguration (since 2000, on 7 May). If the president is chosen in an early election, they are scheduled to take the oath thirty days after the announcement of the results.

Before executing the powers of the office, a president is constitutionally required to take the presidential oath:

I swear in exercising the powers of the President of the Russian Federation to respect and safeguard the rights and freedoms of man and citizen, to observe and protect the Constitution of the Russian Federation, to protect the sovereignty and independence, security and integrity of the State, to faithfully serve the people.

=== Vacancy or disability ===
Vacancies in the office of president may arise under several possible circumstances: death, resignation and removal from office. In all cases when the president is unable to perform their duties, their powers are temporarily transferred to the prime minister until the new president takes office.

== Insignia ==
After the oath of office has been taken by the elected president, these following insignia are handed over to the president. These devices are used to display the rank of their office and are used on special occasions.

=== Chain of office ===
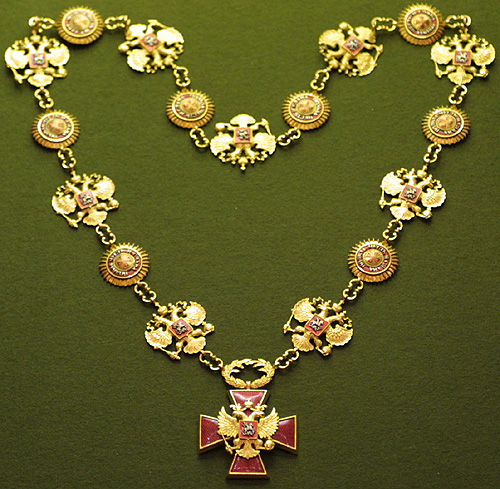
Chain of office

The first insignia that is issued is the chain of office with an emblem. The central emblem is the red cross of the Order "For Merit to the Fatherland", with arms in equal size, charged with the Russian coat of arms. On the reverse of the cross, the words "Benefit, Honor and Glory" appear in the form of a circle. A golden wreath is used to connect the cross with the rest of the chain. There are 17 "links" in the emblem, with nine consisting of the Russian coat of arms. The other eight consist of a rosette, also bearing the motto "Benefit, Honor and Glory." At the inauguration of Vladimir Putin, the emblem was placed on a red pillow, positioned on the left side of the podium. According to the Presidential website, the emblem is placed inside the Kremlin and is used only on certain occasions.

=== Standard (flag) ===
The standard is a square version of the Russian flag, charged in the center with the Russian coat of arms. Golden fringe is added to the standard. Copies of the standard are used inside their office, at the Kremlin, other state agencies, and while the president is traveling in a vehicle inside Russia. A 2:3 ratio version of the flag is used when the President is at sea. This is the most used symbol to denote the presence of the Russian President.

=== Special copy of the Constitution ===
The President also has a special copy of the Russian Constitution that is used during the inauguration. This copy has a hard, red cover with gold lettering. An image of the Russian coat of arms appears in silver. The special copy is kept in the Presidential Library.

=== Legal basis of the insignia ===
These insignia and the procedure were established by the presidential decree 1138 from 5 August 1996, and modified by decree 832 from 6 May 2000. In the new decree the special copy of the Constitution was removed as the third symbol of the Russian Presidency; the other two symbols remained intact because they were and are regulated by separate decrees. Nonetheless, the special copy of the Constitution still exists and serves for inauguration purposes only without being officially presented as a symbol of the Russian Presidency.

=== Presidential Fanfare ===
The Presidential Fanfare

The Presidential Fanfare is a composition played exclusively for the President of Russia, when they enter a place or an event.

== Powers and duties ==
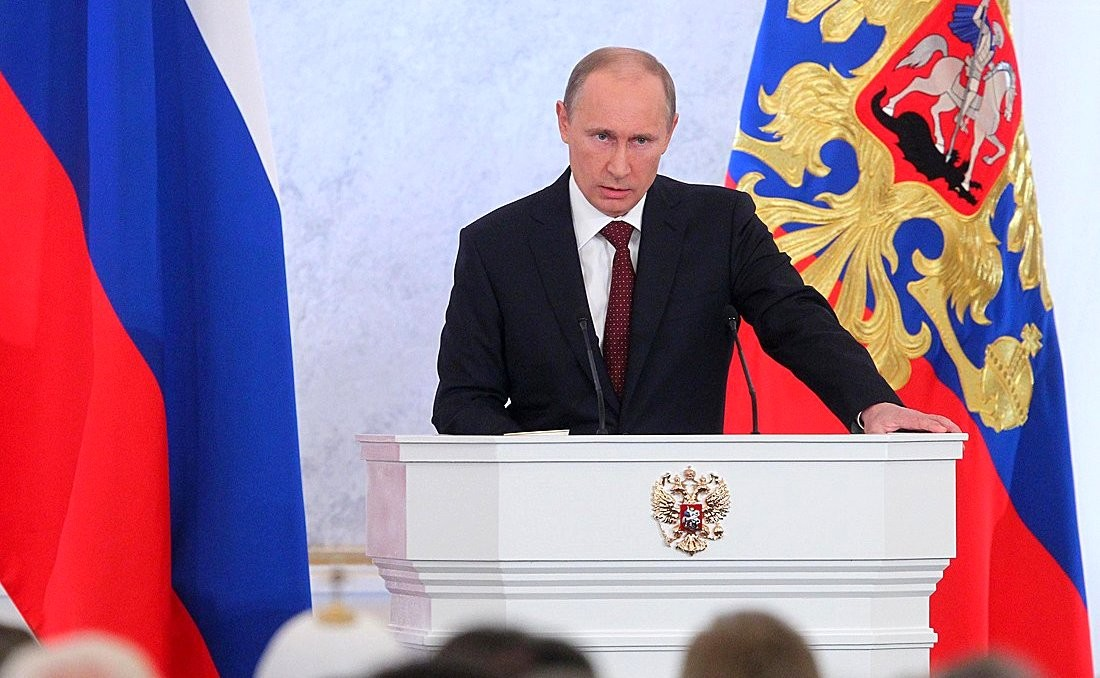
President Vladimir Putin delivering the 2012 Address to the Federal Assembly

=== Guarantor of the Constitution ===
As the guarantor of the Constitution and the entire system of constitutional law, the president ensures that the constitutions, laws and regulations of the constituent territories of the Russian Federation be in full compliance with the country's Constitution and federal laws.

=== Nominations ===
The president is highly active in appointing top officials in the country. They nominate candidates for official state positions, who must ultimately be appointed based on parliamentary vote. The president submits nominations to the Federation Council, the upper house of the parliament, for judges of the Constitutional Court and the Supreme Court, as well as for prosecutor general of Russia. A proposal to relieve the prosecutor general of their duties must also be submitted to the Federation Council. The president submits to the State Duma, the lower house of parliament, nominations for appointment to the office of the chairperson of the Central Bank, and likewise submits to the State Duma any proposal to relieve the chairperson of the Central Bank of their duties.

=== Legislation ===
Under the procedure stipulated by the Constitution, the president exercises their right to submit draft legislation, as well as the right to sign bills into law or to veto them.

The president has the right to suspend laws and regulations issued by executive bodies of Russia's constituent territories if such laws and regulations contravene the Constitution, federal laws or international obligations of the Russian Federation, or violate human and civil rights and liberties, pending the resolution of the issue in an appropriate court.

The president can issue by-laws by decree, so long as such decrees are not in contradiction with existing laws (both local and federal), Russia's international agreements or the Russian Constitution.

The president is further empowered to grant federal pardons and reprieves, and to convene and adjourn either or both houses of the Federal Assembly under extraordinary circumstances.

Other powers of the president in the sphere of legal activities and in their interaction with the parliament include calling elections to the State Duma, dissolving the State Duma in certain cases, and calling a referendum.

=== Domestic policy ===
Under the Constitution, the president is not empowered to determine the full range of short-, middle-, and long-term objectives and targets of domestic policy, but only its basic guidelines. In practice, they determine it with the prime minister and the government of the federation. They are to be implemented both by the president themself and by the government of Russia within the bounds of their authority. The president's fundamental positions on domestic policy issues are expressed in their written decisions regarding draft federal constitutional laws and draft federal laws, as well as their letters explaining the reasons for rejecting draft federal laws.

Within the bounds of the authority granted to the head of state by the Constitution and other laws, the president also shapes the basic domestic policy guidelines by issuing legal regulations and through organizational and regulatory activity, such as issuing decrees and executive orders. Each year the president is required to make an Address to the Federal Assembly regarding the situation in the country and the internal and foreign policy of the state.

=== Foreign policy ===
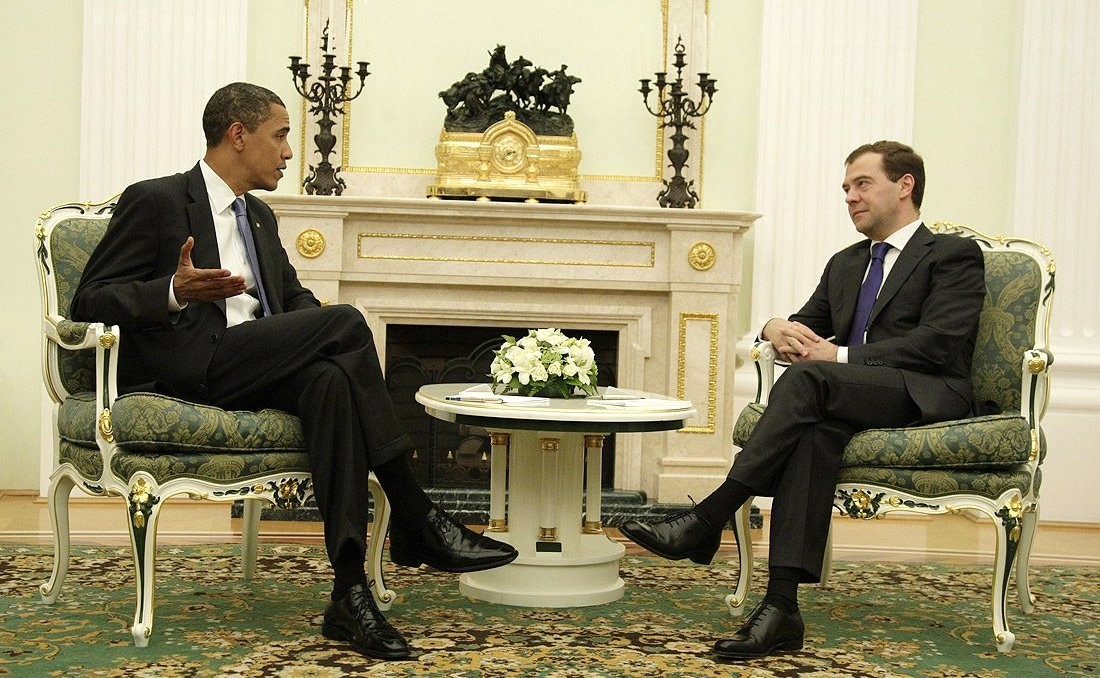
President Dmitry Medvedev with US president Barack Obama in 2009

The president is invested with extensive rights to implement the state's foreign policy. The president determines Russia's position in international affairs, along with the prime minister and the government of the federation, and represents the state in international relations, conducts negotiations and signs ratification documents. The president appoints and recalls diplomatic representatives of Russia to foreign states and international organizations. These appointments are preceded by consultations with the respective committees or commissions of the two houses of the Federal Assembly. The president signs international treaties.

=== Commander-in-chief ===
Insignia of the Supreme Commander-in-Chief

The president of Russia bears ultimate authority over the Russian Armed Forces as "Supreme Commander-in-Chief", a role established by Article 87 of the Constitution. In this capacity, the president issues military directives, makes defence policy and appoints the High Command of the Armed Forces.

Furthermore, several articles of the Defence Statute enable the president to order a general or partial mobilization of the military, announce martial law, oversee the war industry and make regulations.

A 2020 military doctrine governs the use of Russian nuclear arms; it allows the president to launch atomic weapons in response to WMD or ballistic missile strikes, attacks that threaten the integrity of the nuclear arsenal, and attacks that may jeopardise the country as a whole.

=== Ceremonial duties ===
An important ceremonial role of the president is awarding state awards. State Awards of the Russian Federation are the highest form of official recognition given to individuals for service to the nation in the fields of defense, state-building, economics, science, culture, art, education, health care, public safety, rights advocacy and charity. The state awards of the Russian Federation include the title of Hero of the Russian Federation, Hero of Labour of the Russian Federation as well as orders, medals, emblems and honorary titles. New state honors and awards can be established by the president, who also presents these honors to the recipients in an official ceremony. A Commission for State Honors, which works on a voluntary basis, helps the president to objectively assess potential recipients.

== Residences ==
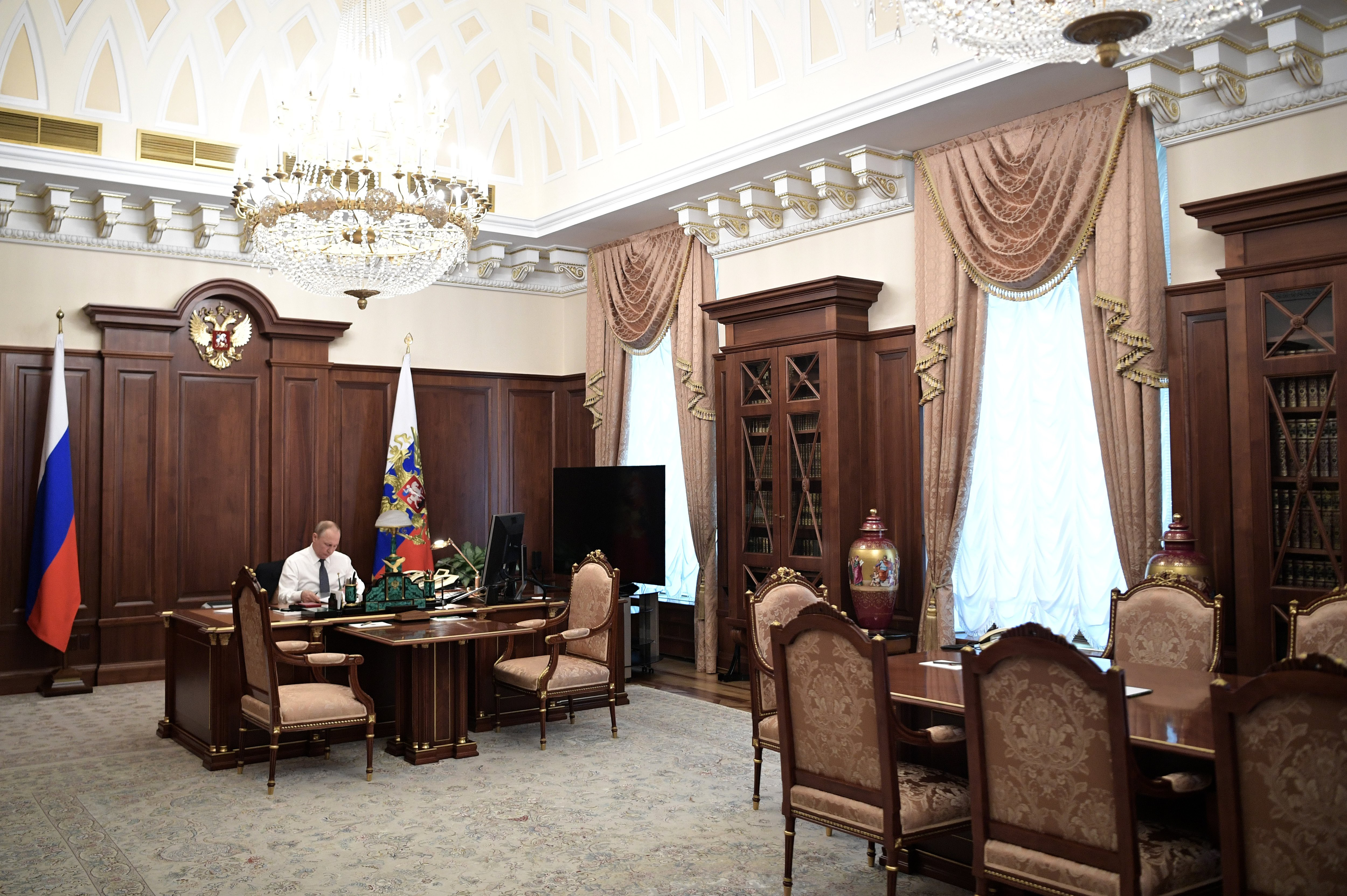
Vladimir Putin in the presidential cabinet

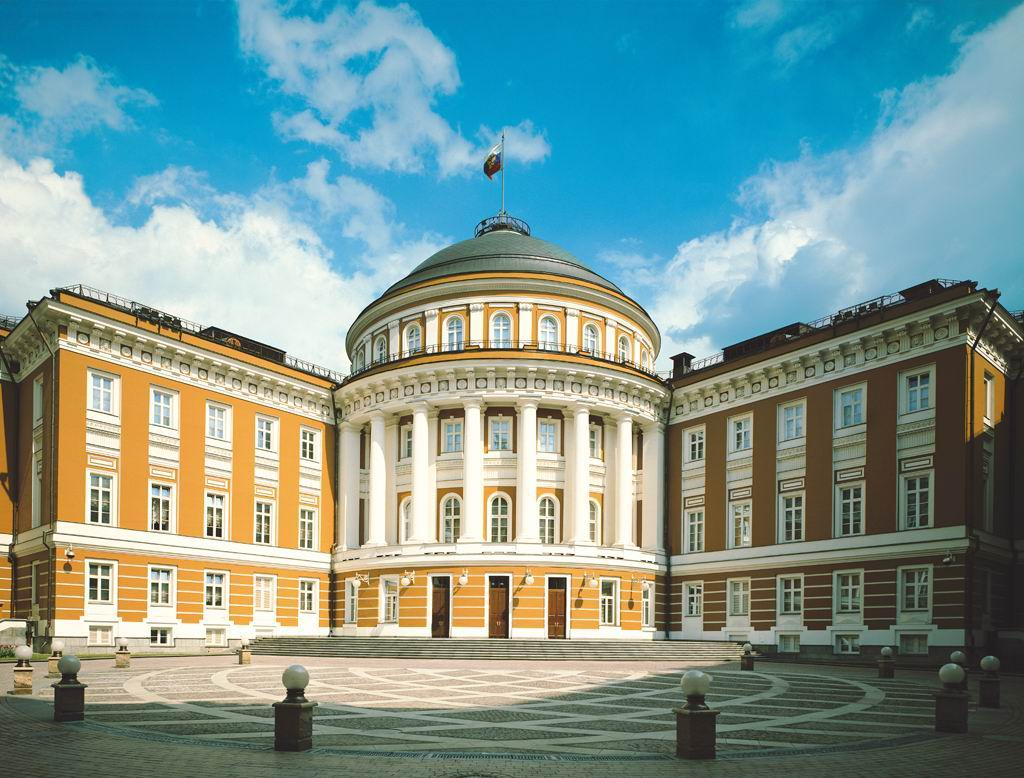
The Kremlin Senate is the working residence of the President of Russia.

The primary working president's residence is the Senate building (also known as 1st building) in the Moscow Kremlin complex. Also the president can use the Grand Kremlin Palace (used for official ceremonies and meetings). Previously, the president also could use the so-called 14th Administrative Corpus Building (the reserve residence), but in 2016, it was demolished.

Since 2000, the current home residence of the president is Novo-Ogaryovo (Russian: Ново-Огарёво). It was planned that it would remain at the disposal of Vladimir Putin after his term ended, as Gorki-9 (Russian: Горки-9) (also called Barvikha (Russian: Барвиха), but actually near it) had remained at the disposal of Boris Yeltsin after his retirement.

Also, the president has several vacation residences outside of Moscow.

- Rus' State Residence (Zavidovo), Tver Oblast
- Congress Palace or Constantine Palace complex (Russian: Дворец конгрессов, Константиновский дворец), Strelna, Saint Petersburg, reconstructed for 300th Saint Petersburg anniversary
- Bocharov Ruchey (Russian: Боча́ров Руче́й, lit. Bocharov creek), Sochi
- Shuyskaya Chupa (Russian: Шу́йская Чупа́) at a distance of 25 km from Petrozavodsk, Karelia
- Dolgiye Borody (Russian: Долгие Бороды) (also known as Uzhin Russian: Ужи́н) at a distance of 20 km from Valday, Novgorod Oblast
- Volzhskiy Utyos sanatorium (Russian: Во́лжский утёс, lit. Cliff-upon-Volga) on Kuybyshev Reservoir shore
- Tantal tourist centre (Russian: Танта́л, lit. Tantalum) on Volga bank, at a distance of 25 km from Saratov
- Sosny (Russian: Со́сны, lit. pines) on Yenisei bank, near Krasnoyarsk.
- Angarskie hutora (Russian: Анга́рские хутора́, lit. Steadings of Angarsk) at a distance of 47 km from Irkutsk
- Maly istok (Russian: Ма́лый исто́к, lit. The small headspring) inside Ekaterineburg forestry

== Political affiliation ==
None of the Russian presidents to date have ever been a member of a political party while in office. In 2012, commenting on stepping down from the post of United Russia party leader, Vladimir Putin said "The constitution doesn't forbid the president to be a member of any party, but in the spirit of how our political life has evolved, a president is first and foremost a consolidating figure for all the political forces of the country, for all citizens".

== Transport ==
National transport services for the Russian president and the presidential state car are provided by the Special Purpose Garage (SPG). The SPG is a unit within the Federal Protective Service.

- Limousines
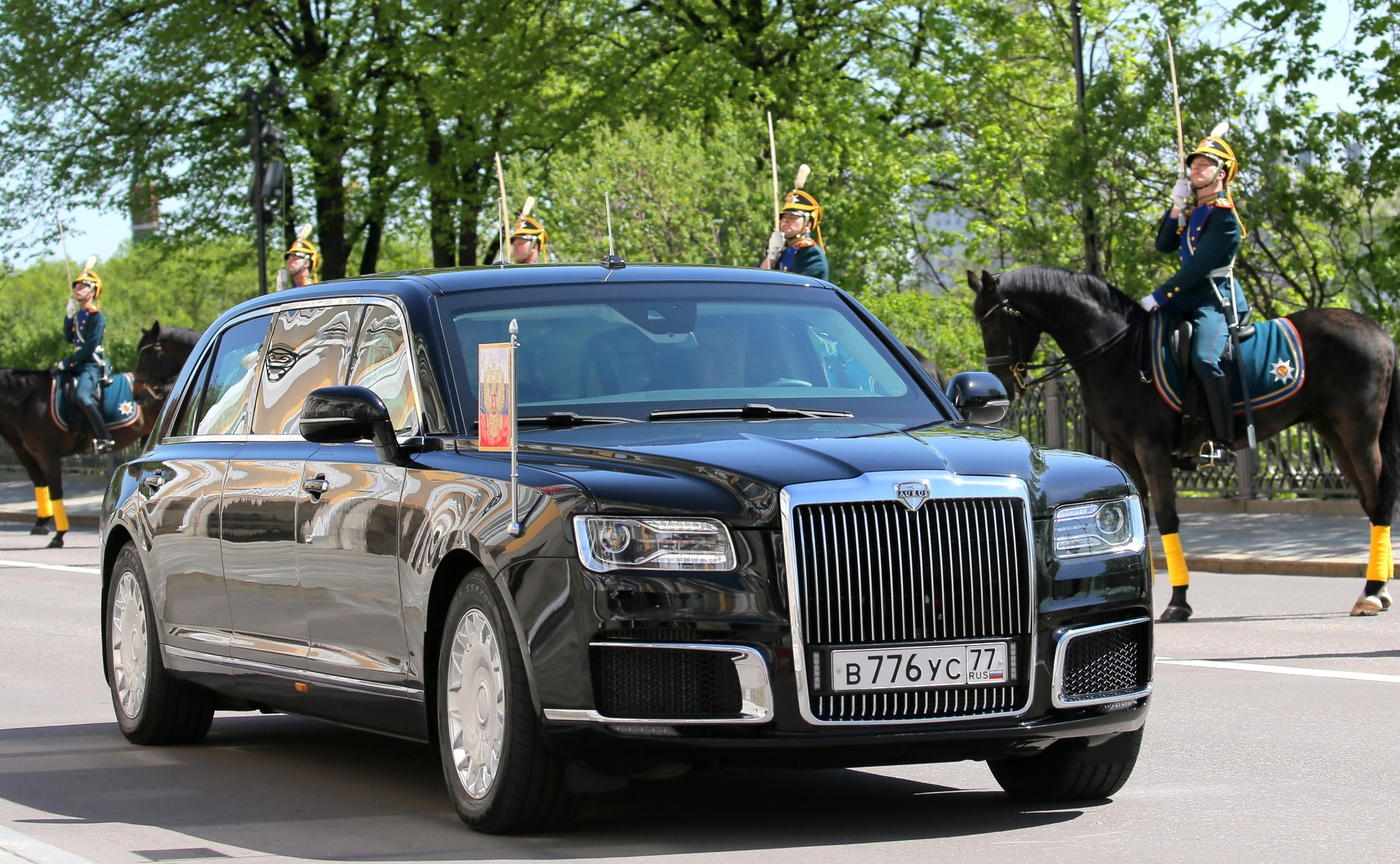
  Aurus Senat – the official Russian presidential executive car
  - Aurus Senat – main car
  - Mercedes-Benz S600 Pullman Guard
- Escort cars
  - Mercedes-Benz (including G-Class)
  - Chevrolet
- Honorary escort (motorcycles)
  - BMW Motorrad

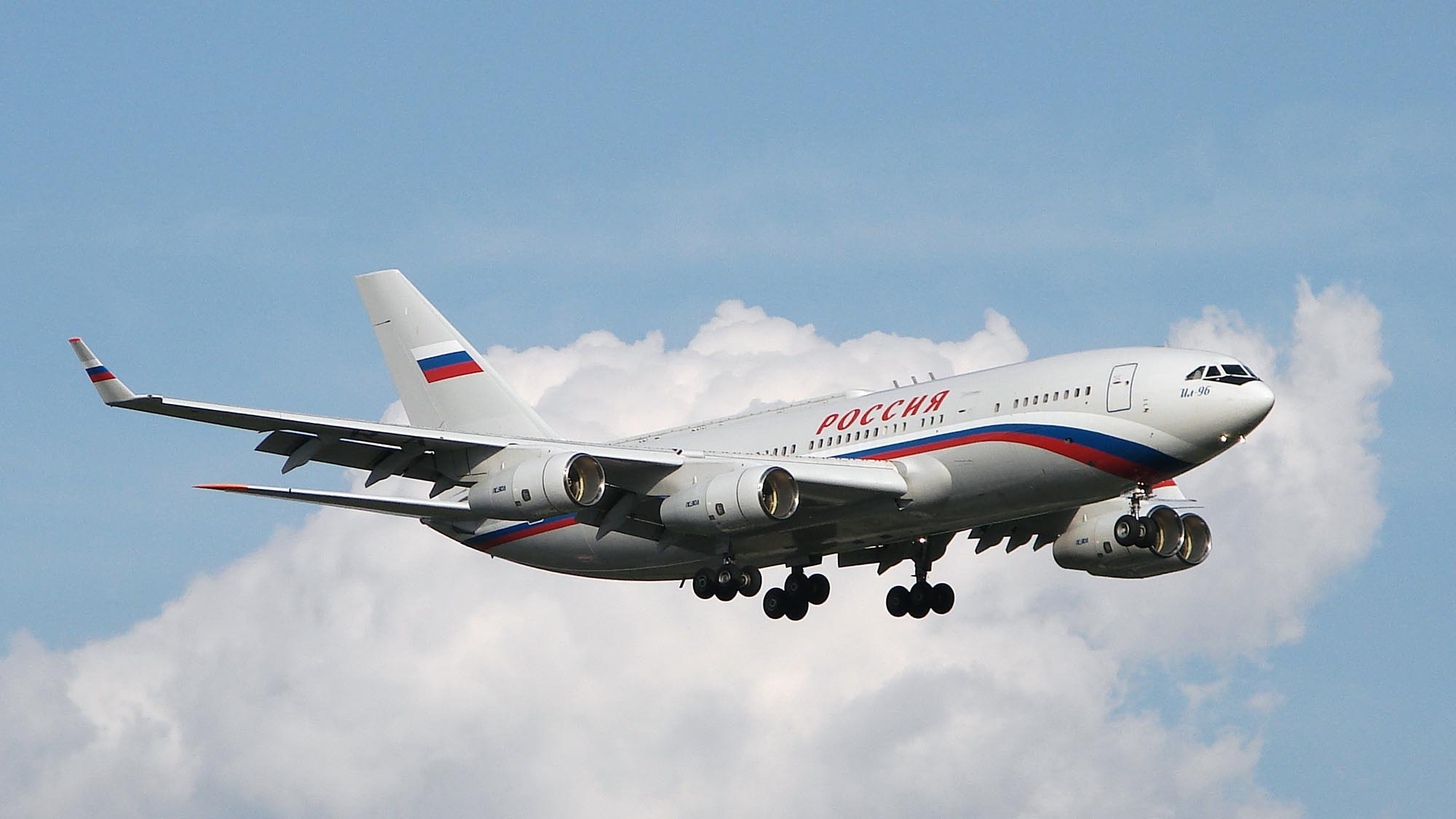
Ilyushin Il-96-300PU – the official Russian presidential aircraft

Air transport services for the president are provided by the airline company Rossiya Airlines.

- Airplanes for long-distance travel
  - Ilyushin Il-96-300PU (long-range) – main aircraft
  - Ilyushin Il-62M (long-range)
  - Dassault Falcon 900 (long-range)
  - Tupolev Tu-154 (medium-range)
  - Yakovlev Yak-40 (short-range)
  - Tupolev Tu-214PU
- Helicopters
  - Mil Mi-8

The presidential aircraft uses the same colour scheme as standard Rossiya aircraft, except for the use of the Russian coat of arms or the presidential standard on the empennage instead of the flag of Russia.

In the spring of 2013 a helipad was constructed in the Moscow Kremlin. According to the chief of the Kremlin Property Agency construction of a helicopter pad for the president cost 200 million rubles (about $6.4 mln). The helipad is located in the Kremlin's Tainitsky Garden close to exterior walls.

== Post-presidency ==
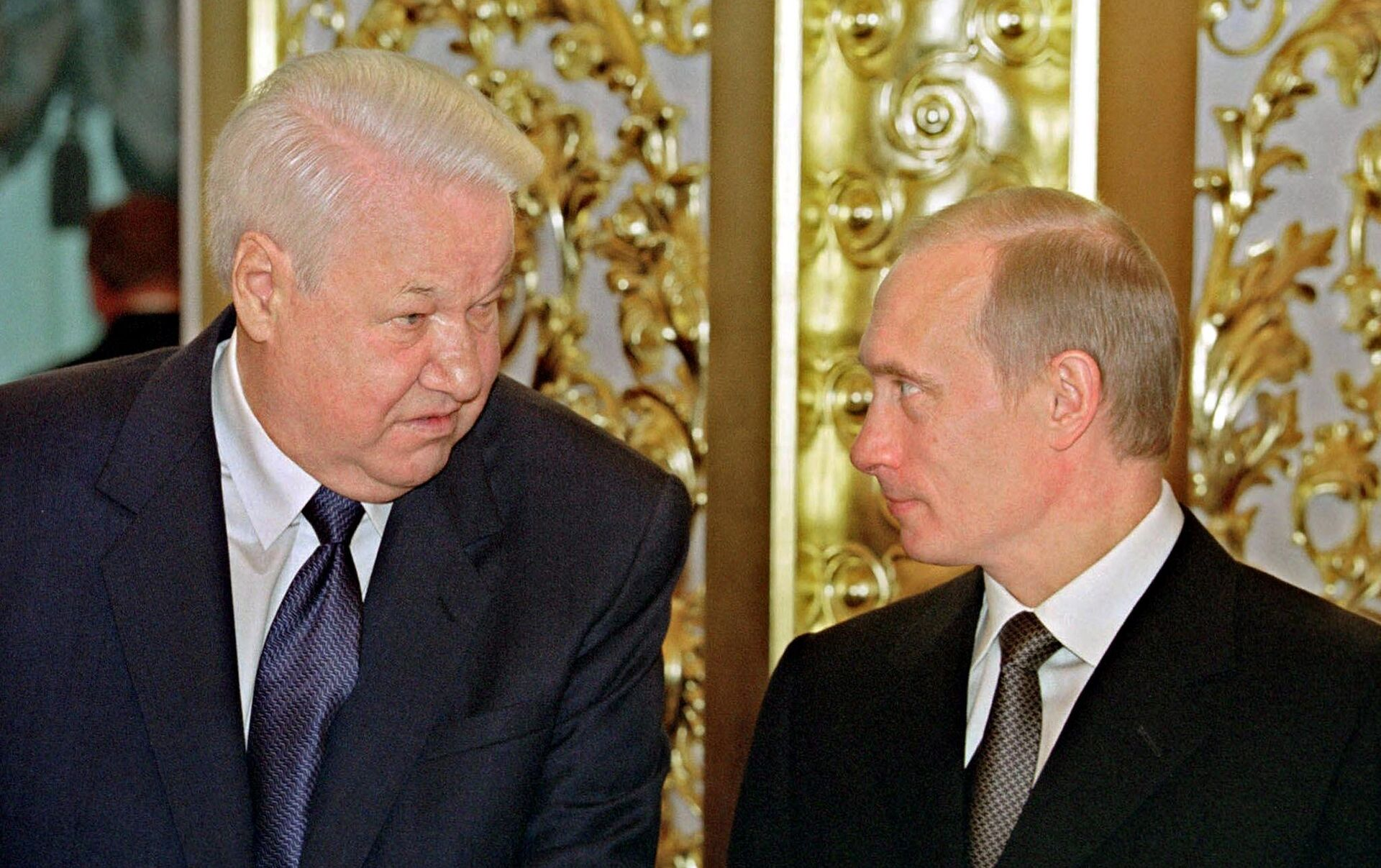
President Vladimir Putin with former president Boris Yeltsin on 12 June 2001

On 16 August 1995, President Boris Yeltsin signed a decree "On some social guarantees of persons holding public positions of the Russian Federation and the position of federal public servants." 15 June 1999 went to President Yeltsin's decree on amendments and additions to the previous decree. On 11 November 1999 Prime Minister Vladimir Putin signed a decree on the implementation of the amended decree of 15 June 1999.

On 31 December 1999, the day of the resignation of Boris Yeltsin, the president issued a decree "On guarantees of the Russian Federation President, stop exercising their powers, and their family," and the eponymous federal law was adopted by 25 January 2001.

This law establishes the legal, social and other guarantees of the Russian Federation's president, stops the execution of its powers in connection with the expiration of their term of office or in advance in the event of their resignation or permanent incapacity for health reasons to exercise the powers belonging to them and their family:

- President of Russia, ceased to carry out its mandate, regardless of age, is entitled to a monthly lifetime pay of 75% of the monthly remuneration of the President of Russia.
- In the case of the President's death their family members are entitled to a monthly allowance in the amount equal to six times the minimum old-age pension, established by the federal law on the day of their death.
- President of Russia, ceased to carry out its mandate, has immunity. They can not be held criminally or administratively liable for acts committed by them during the execution of the President's powers, as well as arrested, detained, interrogated and subjected to a personal search, if these actions are carried out in the course of proceedings relating to the execution of their powers as president.

Beginning in 1999, all living former presidents were granted a pension, an office, and a staff. The pension has increased numerous times. Retired presidents receive a pension based on the salary of the government. All former presidents, their spouses, and their children until age 16 are protected by the Federal Protective Service until the president's death. A spouse who remarries or divorced from president is no longer eligible for Federal Protective Service protection.

In 2020, the Constitution was amended to grant the former president immunity (except if they were removed from office by impeachment). This immunity may be lifted in the same manner as the impeachment procedure. Also, in accordance with the amendments, former presidents (except if they were removed from office by impeachment) were granted the right to become senators for life.

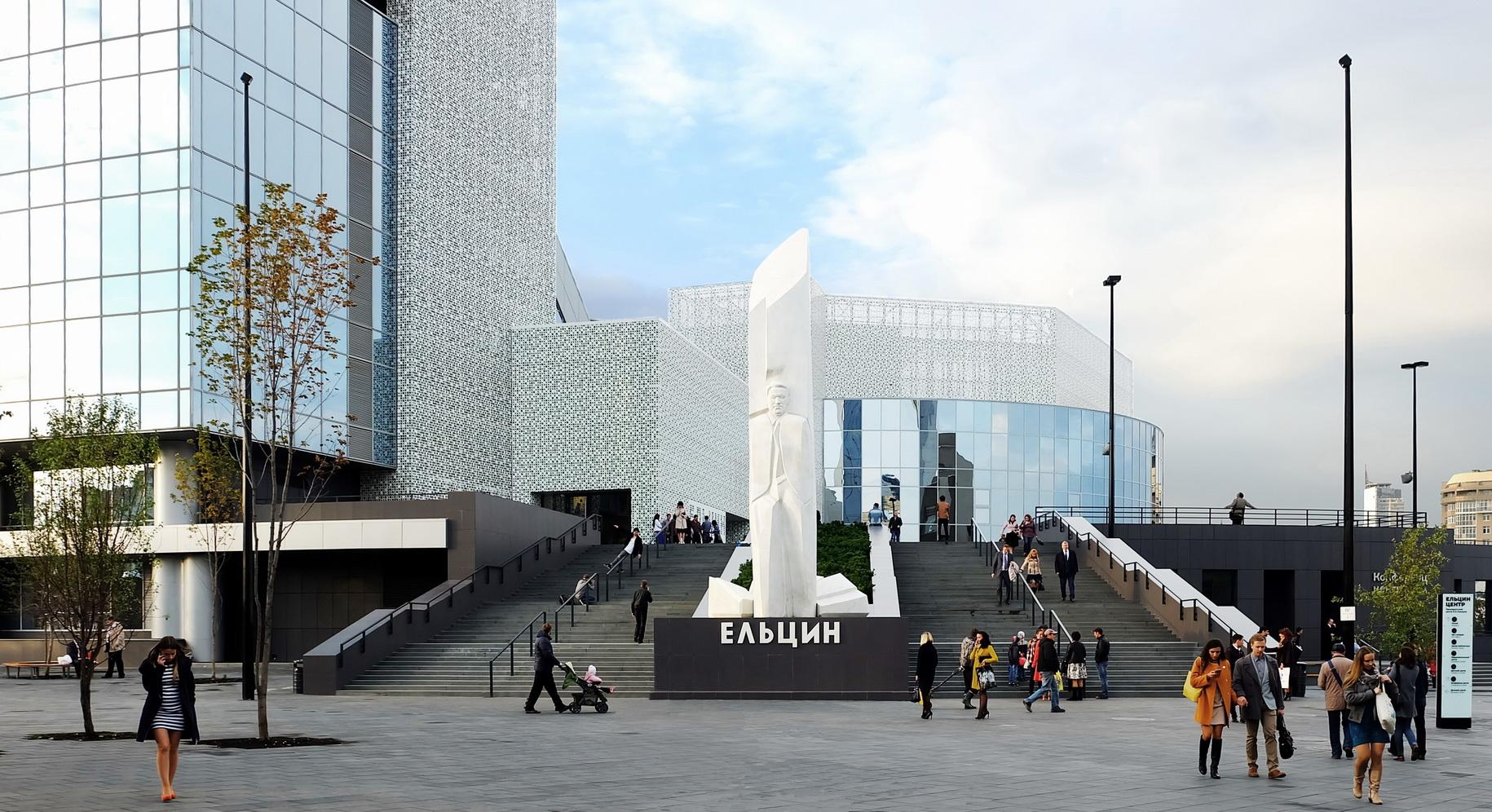
Boris Yeltsin Presidential Center, Yekaterinburg

In May 2008, the Federal law №68, "On centers of historical heritage of presidents of the Russian Federation ceased to carry out its powers", was adopted. According to this law, the objectives of the centers are the study and public presentation of historical heritage of presidents of Russia as an integral part of the modern history of Russia, the development of democratic institutions and the rule of law. The centers will be built for each former president of Russia. The first such center dedicated to Boris Yeltsin was opened in 2015 in Yekaterinburg. In the future the creation of presidential centers for Vladimir Putin and Dmitry Medvedev is also planned.

== List of presidents ==
No.	Portrait	Name (Birth–Death)	Term			Political party	Election
No.	Portrait	Name (Birth–Death)	Took office	Left office	Duration	Political party	Election
1	Boris Yeltsin	Boris Yeltsin (1931–2007)	10 July 1991	31 December 1999	8 years, 174 days	Independent	1991; 1996
–	Vladimir Putin	Vladimir Putin (born 1952); Acting	31 December 1999	7 May 2000	128 days	Unity	–
2	Vladimir Putin	Vladimir Putin (born 1952)	7 May 2000	7 May 2008	8 years, 0 days	Independent	2000; 2004
3	Dmitry Medvedev	Dmitry Medvedev (born 1965)	7 May 2008	7 May 2012	4 years, 0 days	United Russia	2008
(2)	Vladimir Putin	Vladimir Putin (born 1952)	7 May 2012	Incumbent	14 years, 189 days	Independent	2012; 2018; 2024

=== Acting ===
No.	Portrait	Name (Birth–Death)	Term			Political party	Election
No.	Portrait	Name (Birth–Death)	Took office	Left office	Duration	Political party	Election
—	Alexander Rutskoydisputed	Alexander Rutskoy disputed (born 1947)	22 September 1993	4 October 1993	12 days	NPSR	—
—	Viktor Chernomyrdin	Viktor Chernomyrdin (1938–2010)	5 November 1996	6 November 1996	1 day	NDR	—

== List of presidential administrations ==
- Presidency of Boris Yeltsin
- Presidency of Vladimir Putin
- Presidency of Dmitry Medvedev

== See also ==
- List of presidents of Russia
- List of Russian presidential candidates
- List of heads of state of Russia
- Lifespan timeline of presidents of Russia
- First Lady of Russia
- Prime Minister of Russia
- President of the Soviet Union
- General Secretary of the Communist Party of the Soviet Union
- Russian presidential administration
