= Zhylin =

Zhylin (Ukrainian: Жилін), feminine: Zhylina is a Ukrainian patronymic surname derived from the nickname Zhyla. Its Russian counterpart is Zhilin (Жилин). Notable people with the surname include:

- Heorhiy Zhylin (1925–1997), Soviet and Ukrainian rower
- Viktor Zhylin (1923–2009), Soviet and Ukrainian football player and manager
- Volodymyr Zhylin
- Yevhen Zhylin
