= Rus' State Residence =

- Государственная резиденция «Русь»
- Interactive map of the Rus' State Residence area
- Alternative names: Zavidovo

General information
- Type: State residence
- Location: Tver Oblast, Kozlovo, Russia
- Coordinates: 56.5108997°N 36.2460552°E
- Client: President of Russia
- Owner: Government of Russia

Rus' State Residence (Russian: Государственная резиденция «Русь») (also known as Zavidovo (Russian: Завидово) after the nearby settlement) is a state residence of the president of the Russian Federation, located near the village of Kozlovo in the Konakovsky District of Tver Oblast, on the territory of the Zavidovo National Park.

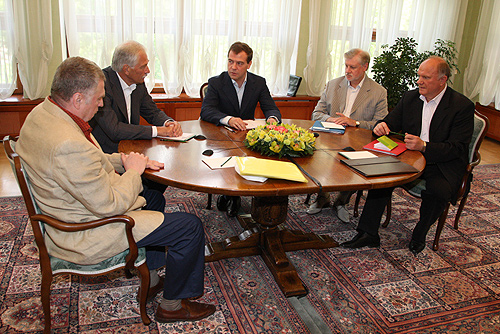
President Medvedev with factions' leaders of the State Duma

The Rus' residence is included in the Zavidovo State Complex of the Federal Security Service. The complex includes both the residence itself and the national park in which it is located - all 125 thousand hectares. The main building (two floors, with a fireplace and oak furniture) is located on the outskirts of the village of Kozlovo. Nearby there is a guest house, a hunting ground, and two lakes for fishing.

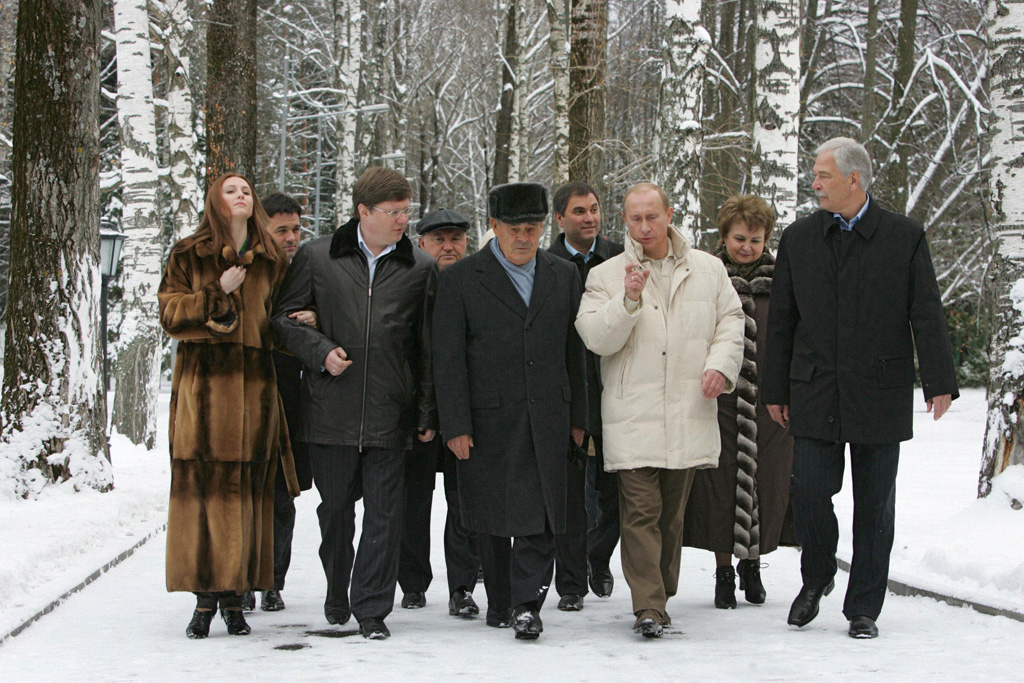
President Putin with the representatives of United Russia

During the Soviet era it was described as the "Politburo hunting preserve" and the "Soviet equivalent of Camp David". Henry Kissinger visited in May 1973 and was informed that it was a great honour to be invited there, being only the third foreigner (after President Tito of Yugoslavia and President Urho Kekkonen of Finland) to be invited. It was extensively used by Leonid Brezhnev, who loved to come hunting In February 1992, Russian president Boris Yeltsin ordered the creation of the Zavidovo State Complex, which includes the Zavidovo National Park and the official country residence of the president, Rus. By the same order, the complex was subordinated to the Federal Security Service of the Russian Federation. On August 18, 1996, by decree signed by President Boris Yeltsin, the Zavidovo State Complex was approved as one of the residences of the president of the Russian Federation. In the 2000s, the residence was occasionally used by president Putin and Medvedev for various public events such as meeting with the State Duma factions' leaders and meetings of the State Council as well as with foreign leaders.
