= Hero of Labour of the Russian Federation =

Russian state award

Honorary Title Hero of Labour of the Russian Federation
- Obverse of the Gold Star of Hero of Labour of the Russian Federation
- Type: Honorary title
- Presented by: Russian Federation
- Eligibility: Citizens of the Russian Federation
- Status: Active
- Established: March 29, 2013
- First award: May 1, 2013

Highlights
- Total: 65
- Related: Hero of Socialist Labour; Hero of The Russian Federation

Hero of Labour of the Russian Federation (Russian: Герой Труда Российской Федерации) is a state award of Russia. The title is awarded to citizens of Russia for special services in labour to the state and its people associated with the achievement of outstanding results in public, social and economic activities aimed at ensuring the welfare and prosperity of Russia.

The award was established by Russian President Vladimir Putin by Presidential Decree No.294 of March 29, 2013, "On establishing the Hero of Labour of the Russian Federation". This award is seen as the successor of Soviet Union's Hero of Socialist Labour.

== Heroes of Labour of the Russian Federation ==
=== Politicians ===
Mintimer Shaimiev, Sergey Lavrov, Nikolay Kharitonov, Valentina Matviyenko, Gennady Zyuganov, Vladimir Resin

=== Artists ===
Valery Gergiev, Joseph Kobzon, Nikita Mikhalkov, Galina Volchek, Mark Zakharov, Yury Solomin, Eduard Artemyev, Yuri Bashmet, Alexandr Shilov, Aleksandra Pakhmutova, Vasily Lanovoy, Iskhak Mashbash, Vladimir Spivakov, Galina Volchek, Aleksandr Zatsepin, Alexander Prokhanov

=== Scientists ===
Herbert Yefremov, Evgeny Velikhov, Georgy Rykovanov, Yury Osipov, Viktor Sadovnichiy, Gennady Krasnikov

=== Others ===
Irina Viner-Usmanova, Vladimir Bogdanov, Arkady Rotenberg, Leonid Roshal, Alexey Miller, Alisa Aksyonova, Igor Kirillov

== See also ==
- Honorary titles of Russia
