= Zavidovo National Park =

National park of Russia

- (Russian: Завидово)
- IUCN category II (national park)
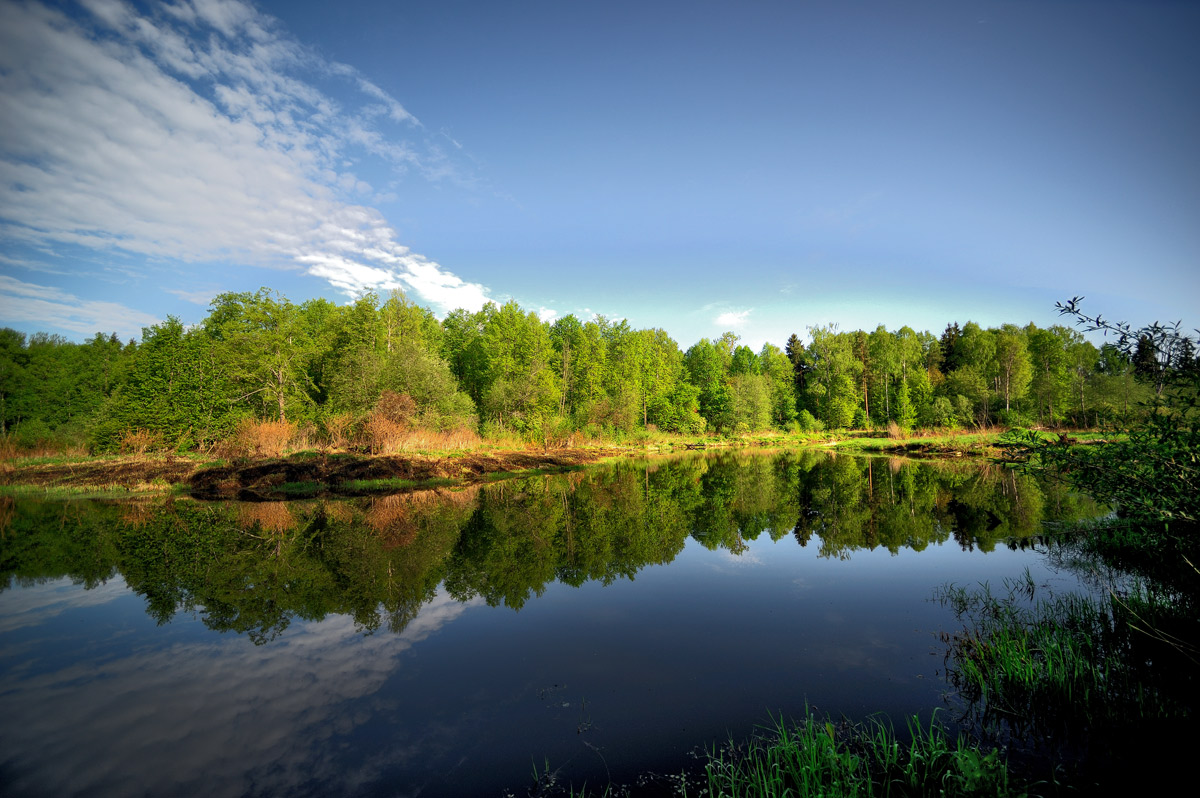
- Lama River

- Location within Russia
- Location: Tver Oblast, Moscow Oblast (Russia
- Nearest city: Moscow
- Coordinates: 56°25′N 36°07′E
- Area: 132,858 hectares (328,299 acres; 1,329 km^{2}; 513 sq mi)
- Established: February 8, 2015

Zavidovo National Park (Russian: Национальный парк «Завидово») is a complex of forests and wetlands located in Tver Oblast and Moscow Oblast, Russia. The area is abundant in game animals and has been a notable hunting reserve for government officials. Since 1994, the area has come under stricter environmental protections, with national park status conferred in 2019. But the area is still heavily used for recreation and there are many private settlements and vacation plots interspersed among protected zones. One activity of the complex is to conduct research into methods for productive hunting. The park is located 50 km south of the city of Tver, and 100 km northwest of Moscow.

== Topography ==
The park is located on the East European Plain in the Upper Volga Lowlands. The Volga River itself passes within 10 km of the park's northeast corner. The park's boundaries encompass a patchwork of special zones: protected natural areas, agricultural sectors, recreational and hunting areas, and villages and hamlets. The landscape is one of flat moraine terrain of mixed forests, swamps, peat bogs, lakes and small rivers. Two main rivers through the park, the Shosha River and the Lama River, have created wide floodplains. The minimum elevation of 119 meters and the maximum is 183 meters. The distance from the southeast to northeast ends of the park is 60 km.

== Ecoregion and climate ==
The park is in the Sarmatic mixed forests ecoregion. The climate is Humid continental climate, warm summer (Köppen climate classification (Dfb)). This climate is characterized by large seasonal temperature differentials and a warm summer (at least four months averaging over 10 °C (50 °F), but no month averaging over 22 °C (72 °F). Average rainfall is 577 mm/year. The growing season is 140–150 days (May–September).

Tver, Russia

Climate chart (precipitation, max. and min. temperature)
J	F	M	A	M	J	J	A	S	O	N	D
0.2 23 13	0.2 25 13	0.4 35 21	1.1 50 33	2.1 63 44	2.8 70 52	2.8 74 56	2.5 69 52	2.2 58 43	1.8 45 35	0.8 33 25	0.3 26 17
- █ Average max. and min. temperatures in °F
- █ Precipitation totals in inches
- Source: Weatherspark.com
Metric conversion
J	F	M	A	M	J	J	A	S	O	N	D
5.1 −5 −11	5.1 −4 −11	10 2 −6	28 10 1	53 17 7	71 21 11	71 23 13	64 21 11	56 14 6	46 7 2	20 1 −4	7.6 −3 −8
- █ Average max. and min. temperatures in °C
- █ Precipitation totals in mm

== Plants and animals ==
While 80% of the ground is tree-covered, the forested are fragmented by meadows, wetlands, and settlements. Of the remaining land, 12% is used for agricultural cropland, 4% is water bodies or wetlands, 2% is grassland, and 2% is built up with human settlement. The dominant forest character is young to middle-aged birch trees, with stands of old spruce, pine and aspen.

The park supports large populations of game animals and birds: elk, wild boar, hare, wolf, fox, roe deer, moose, black grouse, hazel grouse, and gray partridge. There are an additional 36 species of mammals, 196 species of birds, and 33 species of fish recorded in the park.

== History and tourism ==
Vladimir Lenin used the area for hunting in the 1920s, and a military hunting reservation operated on the grounds for much of the 20th century. The transition to a national park has increased the protections for wild species.

Because the park is easily accessible from Moscow by highway and train, it sees heavy recreational load. The permanent population within the park's settlements is 16,700; this doubles in the summer. Local authorities have allocated gardening plots and small dachas to over 14,000 people. Access to the park by non-residents requires a permit, and some areas are closed to the public.

== See also ==
- Protected areas of Russia
- Rus' State Residence
