= Valday (inhabited locality) =

Valday (Russian: Валдай) is the name of several inhabited localities in Russia.

Urban localities

- Valday, Novgorod Oblast, a town in Valdaysky District of Novgorod Oblast; administratively incorporated as a town of district significance

Rural localities

- Valday, Republic of Karelia, a settlement in Segezhsky District of the Republic of Karelia
