= Joseph Kobzon =

Russian singer of Ukrainian Jewish descent (1937–2018)

- Иосиф Кобзон
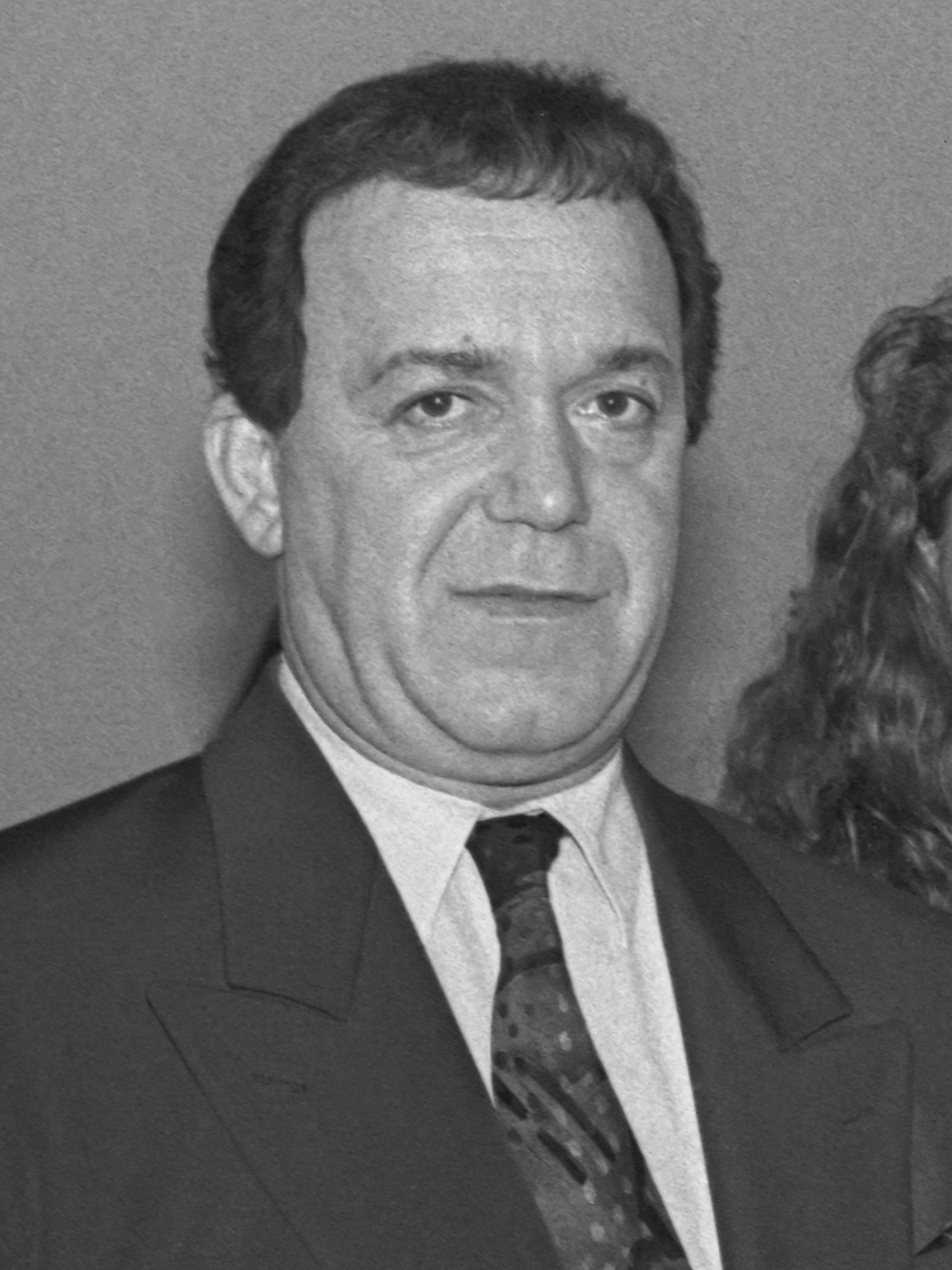
- Kobzon in 1993
- Born: Iosif Davidovich Kobzon; 11 September 1937; Chasov Yar, Ukrainian SSR, Soviet Union
- Died: 30 August 2018 (aged 80); Moscow, Russia
- Occupations: Singer, deputy of the Russian State Duma
- Title: Hero of Labour of the Russian Federation (2016): People's Artist of the USSR (1987); People's Artist of Ukraine (1991)
- Political party: United Russia (until 2018)
- Awards: Order "For Merit to the Fatherland" (Russia,1st, 2nd, 3rd class); Order of Courage (Russia); Order of Friendship of Peoples (USSR); Order of Merit (Ukraine, 1st, 2nd, 3rd class); Dostlug Order (Azerbaijan); Order of Merit of the Republic of Hungary; Shohrat Order (Azerbaijan); Mesrop Mashtots Medal (Armenia); Order of Friendship (Kazakhstan, 2nd class); USSR State Prize (1984)
- Musical career
- Genres: Soviet music, opera, operatic pop, pop, jazz
- Years active: 1956–2018

Joseph Davydovich Kobzon (Note: Russian: Иосиф Давыдович Кобзон, romanized: Iosif Davydovich Kobzon, also Yosyp Davydovych Kobzon (Ukrainian: Йосип Давидович Кобзон)) (11 September 1937 – 30 August 2018) was a Russian singer, known for his crooner style.

== Early life ==
Kobzon was born to Jewish Ukrainian parents in the mining town of Chasiv Yar, in the Donbas region of Ukraine.

As a boy he demonstrated a talent for singing, winning numerous regional singing contests. He reached the national finals on twice, appearing in concerts dedicated to Joseph Stalin – a significant honour at the time.

Despite his talent for singing, Kobzon went on to technical school to study geology and mining in Dnipropetrovsk, as this was considered a lucrative vocation in the Soviet Union following the Second World War. However, in 1959, following his 1956–1959 contact with professional music instructors in the Soviet Army where he was a member of the armies song and dance ensemble, he decided that music would be his preferred vocation.

During his studies, he became interested in boxing, won the Dnipropetrovsk championship among young men, then the Ukrainian championship, but quit the sport after being knocked out for the first time.

== Stage career ==
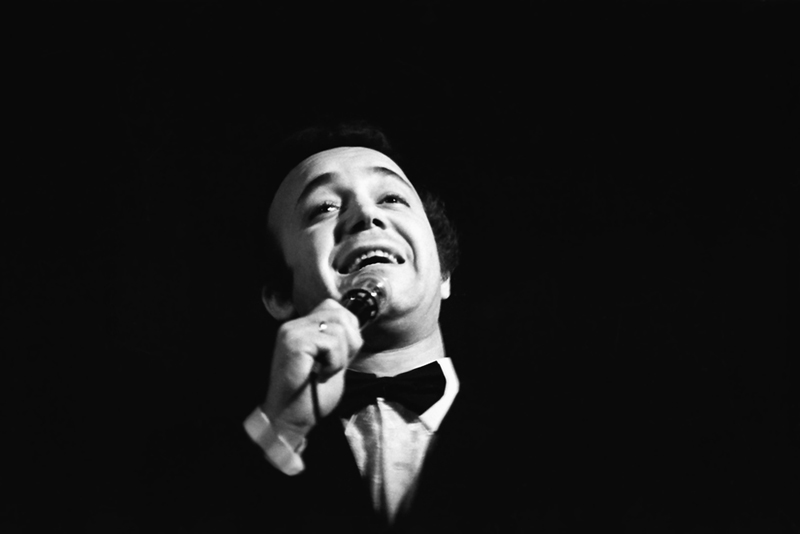
Kobzon performs in 1972

In 1958, Kobzon officially started his singing career in Moscow, and enrolled to study at the Gnessin Institute. In the next few years he made valuable contacts in Moscow's entertainment world, and was eventually given a chance by composer Arkady Ostrovsky to perform some of his music. Initially, he performed in a duet with the tenor Viktor Kokhno, but was eventually offered a solo repertoire by many of the outstanding composers of the time such as Mark Fradkin, Alexander Dolukhanian and Yan Frenkel.

Since 1959, he worked at the Moscow Circus on Tsvetnoy Boulevard as a vocalist in Mark Mestechkin's program, performing the song "We are circus artists…", which not only allowed him to initially solve his material problems, but also, according to the artist, gave him "the opportunity to see real creative work – work to exhaustion, to bloody calluses."

In 1962, he recorded his first LP which included songs written by Aleksandra Pakhmutova.

In 1964, he triumphed at the International Song Contest in Sopot, Poland, and in the following year he took part in the "Friendship" contest held across six nations, winning first prize in Warsaw, Berlin and Budapest.

His popularity rose quickly, and demand for his singing saw him frequently performing two to three concerts a day. His most popular hit song at the time was titled "And in our yard".

During Leonid Brezhnev's time in office (1964–1982), there was hardly an official concert where Kobzon did not take part, and in 1980 he was awarded the honour of People's Artist of the USSR.

His best-known song is "Instants" from the legendary Soviet TV series Seventeen Moments of Spring (1973). Kobzon sang many songs for the Seventeen Moments of Spring, but, because of his Jewish nationality, he was not listed on the credits.

In 1983, Kobzon was expelled from the Communist Party of the Soviet Union and reprimanded for "political short sightedness," after he performed Jewish songs during an international friendship concert, which resulted in the Arab delegations leaving in protest. The following year (1984), his reputation was restored, as he was awarded the USSR State Prize.

Kobzon has performed in solo concerts in most cities of the former USSR. He also performed international concert tours as a representative of the USSR in the United States, Panama, Peru, Ecuador, Bolivia, Uruguay, Costa Rica, Argentina, Israel, Republic of the Congo, Zaire, Angola, Nigeria, Portugal, Spain, Sweden, Germany, Greece, and Finland. He has shared the stage with Liza Minnelli and Julio Iglesias.

Although he officially ended his international touring career in 1997, he continued to appear in regular concerts before audiences around the world and was frequently seen on Russian television.

== Public life ==
Kobzon has been active in Russian politics since 1989. He was an experienced Russian MP and got to be reelected several times.

He was Chairman of the Public Council of Moscow's Police Department, and leader of his political party "The Russian Party for Peace".

Kobzon's innumerable contributions to culture, music, humanitarian and political life across the Commonwealth of Independent States saw a monument depicting Kobzon erected near his birthplace, in Donetsk, Ukraine in 2003.

Between 2005 and 2007, he was the head of the State Duma's culture committee.

In 2009, Kobzon became the 24th individual to be named Honorary Citizen of Moscow.

He had suffered from prostate cancer since 2005. He died on 30 August 2018.

== Russia's Frank Sinatra ==
"Gde-to daleko" (Где-то далеко, transl. Somewhere far away)
Sample "Gde-to daleko" from television series Seventeen Moments of Spring by Iosif Kobzon (1973)

Considering Kobzon's career, personality, spirit and singing style, many say that he was Russia's answer to the U.S. crooner Frank Sinatra. Besides their singing careers, both Sinatra and Kobzon used their popularity towards an active involvement in politics. The parallels between the two became the focus of media articles, books and novels claiming to have detailed knowledge of Russia's gangster world based on inside information obtained from the CIA. As a result, Kobzon was barred entry to the United States from 1995 when his visa was revoked on allegations of mafia ties. In response, Kobzon successfully sued numerous publications for propagating unsubstantiated rumours, asserting his impeccable reputation and great honour among millions of Russian-speakers worldwide.

== Stance on Ukraine ==
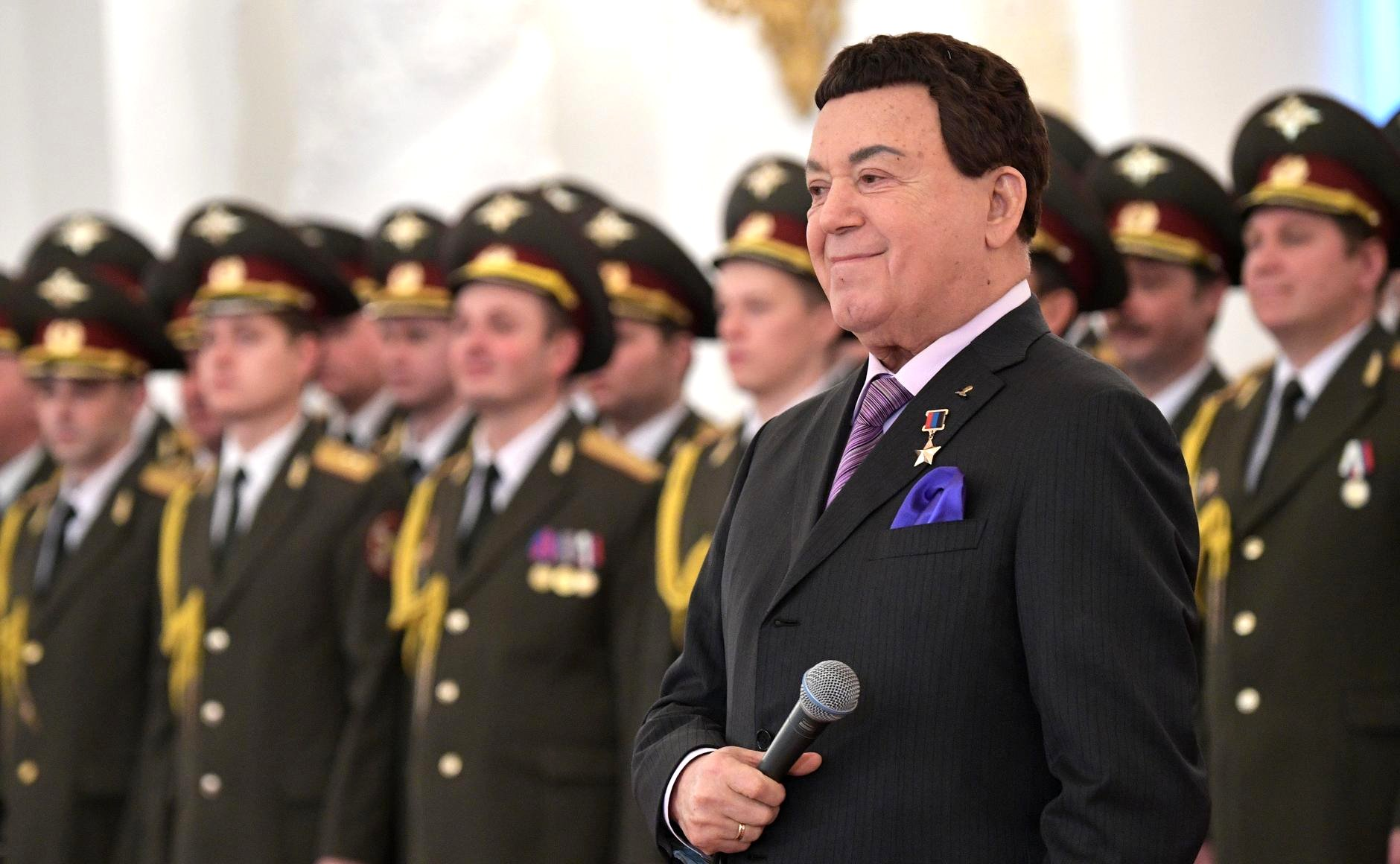
Kobzon performs for Russian soldiers at Heroes of the Motherland Day, 2016. A Hero of the Donetsk People's Republic medal is seen on his jacket

In March 2014, Kobzon was among 500 Russian artists who signed an open letter in support of Russia's annexation of Crimea. As a result, in July 2014, Kobzon was included in a selected group of Russian artists banned from entering Latvia.

Following the Revolution of Dignity, pro-Russian unrest broke out in Ukraine. In late October 2014, Kobzon visited Donbas on a humanitarian mission, providing medications to hospitals in the Donetsk and Luhansk regions and giving a free concert in support of the people of the self-proclaimed Donetsk People's Republic (DPR.) As a result of the visit, Alexander Zakharchenko (then Prime Minister of the Donetsk People's Republic) bestowed on Kobzon the title of Russia's "honorary consul" to DPR. However, the title had questionable meaning as there are no reports of Russia formally sending Kobzon as an honorary consul to DPR nor ratifying this appointment.

On 3 September 2014 deputies of the Dnipropetrovsk City Council deprived Kobzon of the title of "Honorary citizen of Dnipropetrovsk", on 25 November 2014 Poltava City Council removed his title of "Honorary citizen of Poltava", and on 28 January 2015 Kramatorsk City Council removed his title of "Honorary citizen of Kramatorsk." In autumn 2014, Ukraine's national security service banned him from entering the country. Kobzon responded by saying that "he shouldn't need a visa to visit his own homeland and birthplace." He stated that he welcomed any decision by Ukraine's authorities to strip him of honours, as he didn't want to be "an honorary citizen of a country that is run by a fascist regime." He requested that Ukraine also strip him of his People's Artist of Ukraine award. In February 2015, Kobzon was awarded Honorary Citizenship of Yenakiieve in Donetsk Oblast (controlled by the Donetsk People's Republic), and was later awarded the honour of 'People's Artist' by self-proclaimed Luhansk People's Republic.

In February 2015, the European Union added Kobzon to its list of individuals sanctioned with asset freezes and travel bans because he had "visited the so-called Donetsk People's Republic and during his visit made statements supporting separatists"; Kobzon responded that he was "very pleased and grateful." Canada also applied economic sanctions and a travel ban. He was "proud to be included in a list of people who are not indifferent to the fate of internally displaced Russian-speakers in Donbas and the fate of Russia". Russian MPs spoke out in response to the EU sanctions, while Kobzon's fans launched a Twitter campaign in his support. Russia's Foreign Ministry said that the new sanctions defy common sense, referring to the fact that Kobzon was on a humanitarian mission to help innocent people caught in a war zone and that the sanctions were imposed just one day after the Minsk II agreement came into force. The agreement was reached between EU representatives (Germany and France), Ukraine and Russia, and was aimed at resolving the war in Donbas. Communist Party leader Gennady Zyuganov condemned Kobzon's inclusion on the sanctions list as "vile" and "cynical", questioning the purpose of sanctioning "a highly respected national artist" whose mission in Donbas was "fundamentally humanitarian." A ruling party MP, Vyacheslav Nikonov, spoke in parliament to support Kobzon, stating "We are with you. If they're all Charlie, then we are all Kobzon", playing on the "Je Suis Charlie" slogan used in the wake of the Charlie Hebdo shooting. In response to calls for retaliatory sanctions, Russia's culture minister Vladimir Medinsky said that Moscow could not impose equal sanctions on the EU, because "Europe simply lacks a star of the same standing as Kobzon." Kobzon returned to Donbas one week following the EU's decision. This was his second humanitarian mission to the region delivering medications to hospitals in Luhansk, and giving another free concert "to support local residents".

== Going to a Kobzon concert ==
The "Kobzon Concert" meme arose after the assassination of Alexander Zakharchenko, the former leader of the self-proclaimed DPR, which took place on 31 August 2018. At that time, jokes were spread in Ukrainian social networks that Zakharchenko went to the "Kobzon concert", who died the day before - on August 30.

After the 24 February 2022 Russian invasion of Ukraine, the phrase in Ukrainian sent to a Kobzon concert (Ukrainian: «відправили на концерт Кобзона») grew in popularity to denote that a pro Russia combatant who was "going to a Kobzon concert" had met a quick death.

== Personal life ==
Kobzon was married three times. In 1965, he married the singer, Veronika Kruglova; then in 1969 Kobzon married Lyudmila Gurchenko, one of the best known comic actresses of the Soviet cinema. In 1971, he married Ninel Drizina with whom he had two children.

== Honours and awards ==
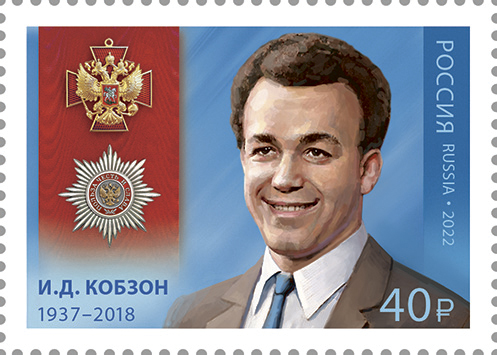
Kobzon on a 2022 stamp of Russia

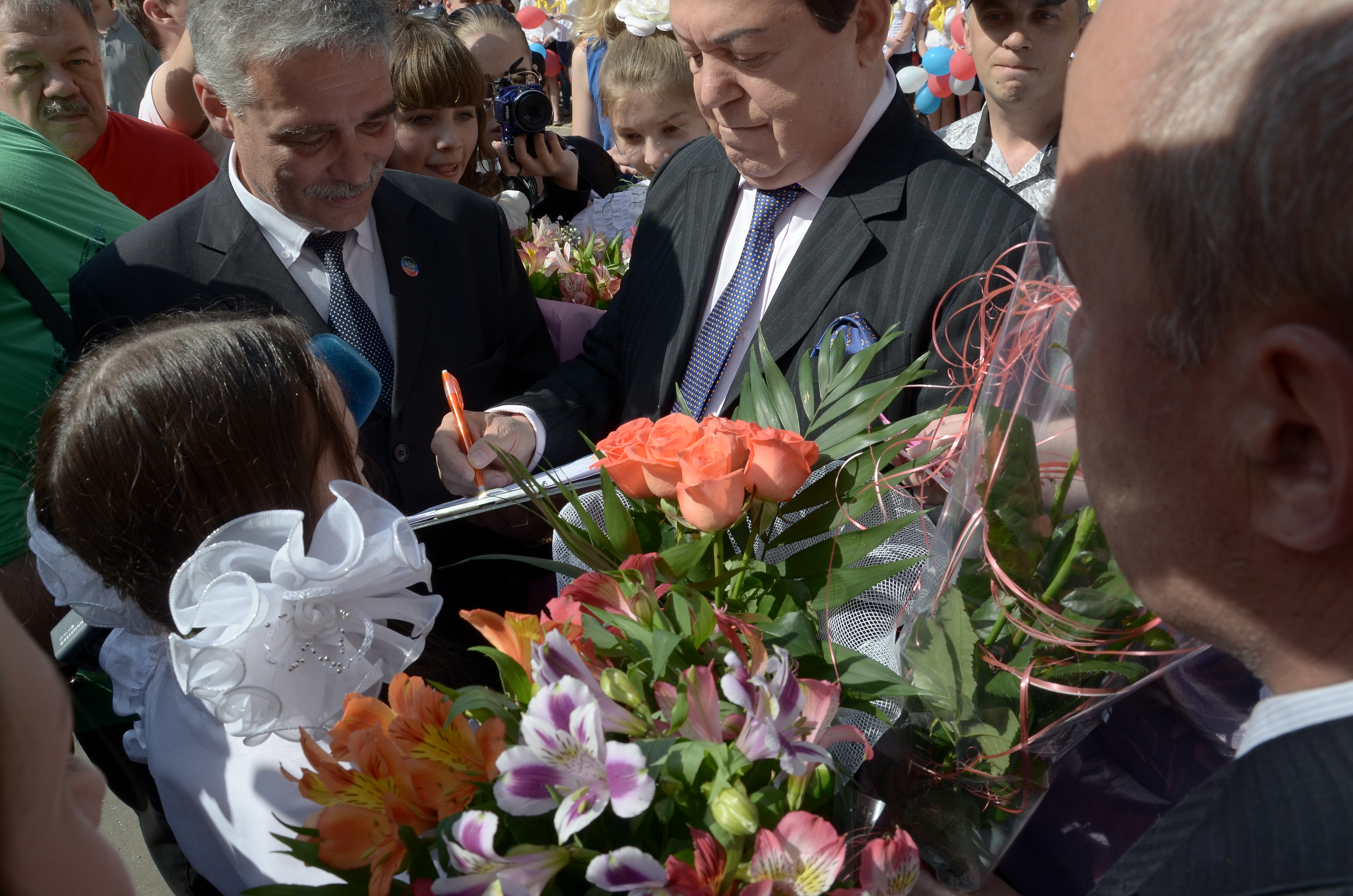
Kobzon in Donetsk in May 2015

Orders

- Order For Merit to the Fatherland 1st class (26 June 2012) – for outstanding contribution to culture and music;
- Order For Merit to the Fatherland 2nd class (21 September 2002) – for outstanding contribution to culture and music;
- Order for Merit for the Fatherland 3rd class (11 September 1997) – for his great personal contribution to the development of musical art;
- Order of Courage (30 December 2002) – for courage and dedication shown during the rescue of people in a situation involving a risk to life during an act of terrorism at the Moscow theater hostage crisis in October 2002;
- Order of Friendship of Peoples;
- Order of Glory (Azerbaijan) (2007) – for services to strengthen cultural ties between the Russian Federation and the Republic of Azerbaijan;
- Officer of the Order of Merit of the Republic of Hungary (2007);
- Ukrainian Order of Merit 1st class (3 July 2012) – for personal contribution to the socio-economic and cultural development of the area, professionalism, and to mark the 80th anniversary of Donetsk region (revoked by the President of Ukraine 14 May 2018);
- Ukrainian Order of Merit 2nd class (3 July 2002) – for personal contribution to the socio-economic and cultural development of the area, professionalism, and to mark the 70th anniversary of Donetsk region (revoked by the President of Ukraine 14 May 2018);
- Ukrainian Order of Merit 3rd class (18 February 2000) – a significant personal contribution to the development of art song, many years of fruitful creative and social activities (revoked by the President of Ukraine 14 May 2018);
- Dostyk order, 2nd class (Kazakhstan, 2008)
- Order of Holy Prince Daniel of Moscow, 2nd class (Russian Orthodox Church, 1998)
- Order of St. Sergius, 2nd class (Russian Orthodox Church, 2002)
- Order "For Merit" (Ingushetia, 2008)
- Order of Friendship (South Ossetia)

Titles

- Hero of Labour of the Russian Federation (21 April 2016)
- People's Artist of the USSR (1987)
- People's Artist of the RSFSR (1980)
- People's Artist of Ukraine (1991, revoked by the President of Ukraine 14 May 2018)
- Honoured Artist of the RSFSR (1973)
- People's Artist of Dagestan ASSR (1974)
- Honoured Artist of the Checheno-Ingush Autonomous Soviet Socialist Republic (1964)
- Honoured Artist of Adygea (1992)
- Honoured Artist of the Karachay-Cherkessia (2008)
- People's Artist of North Ossetia–Alania (2008)
- Honorary Member of the Russian Academy of Arts
- Honoured Worker of the Federal Bailiff Service

Medals

Order	Country / Org	Year
Jubilee Medal "In Commemoration of the 100th Anniversary since the Birth of Vladimir Il'ich Lenin"	USSR	
Medal "In Commemoration of the 1500th Anniversary of Kyiv"	USSR	
Medal "Veteran of Labour"	USSR	
Medal "For Labour Valour"	USSR	1970
Jubilee Medal "300 Years of the Russian Navy"	Russia	
Medal "In Commemoration of the 850th Anniversary of Moscow"	Russia	
Jubilee Medal "60 Years of Victory in the Great Patriotic War 1941–1945"	Russia	
Jubilee Medal "Great Russian writer Nobel Mikhail Sholokhov 1905–2005"	Russia	
Medal "For Strengthening Military Cooperation"	Russia	
Medal "200 Years of the Ministry of Internal Affairs"	Russia	2008
Medal "200 Years of the Ministry of Defence"	Russia	
Medal "For Services to the Stavropol Territory"	Russia	2008
Medal "Glory of Adygea"	Russia	2008
Medal of Merit for the Chechen Republic	Russia	
Medal "Astana"	Kazakhstan	
Medal "50 Years to Tselina"	Kazakhstan	
Medal "Hero of the Donetsk People's Republic"	Donetsk People's Republic	

Awards

- USSR State Prize (1984) – for concert programs 1980–1983
- Lenin Komsomol Prize (1976) – for concert programs 1974–1975, active propaganda Soviet Komsomol songs
- Russian Federal Security Service Award "for creative contribution to the patriotic education of Russian citizens" (2009)

Awards
Ovation
Preceded by 1994 Alla Pugacheva	Living Legend Award; 1995; Joseph Kobzon	Succeeded by 1996 Edita Piekha

Kobzon was awarded honorary citizenship of 28 cities: Anapa, Saratov (1998), Donetsk (2007), Bishkek, Dnipropetrovsk (deprived of the honor on 3 September 2014), Kramatorsk, Noginsk, Poltava (deprived of the honor on 25 November 2014), Slavic (1999), Chasiv Yar, Cherkessk, Artemovsk, Horlivka and others. He was also an honorary citizen of the Saratov Oblast, Ust-Orda Buryat Autonomous Okrug (abolished 2008) and the Transbaikal Oblast (2010).

On 31 March 2009, Kobzon was awarded the title of Honorary Citizen of Moscow – "for his services and contribution to the organization and development of national culture, long-term activities designed to meet the challenges of the patriotic and cultural education of the Russian people, as well as charitable activity in the city of Moscow and other Russian regions".

Other honours

- Monument in Donetsk by Alexander Rukavishnikov (30 August 2003)
- Diploma of the Government of the Kabardino-Balkar Republic (2008)
