= All-Russian Scientific Research Institute Of Technical Physics =

Russian Research team

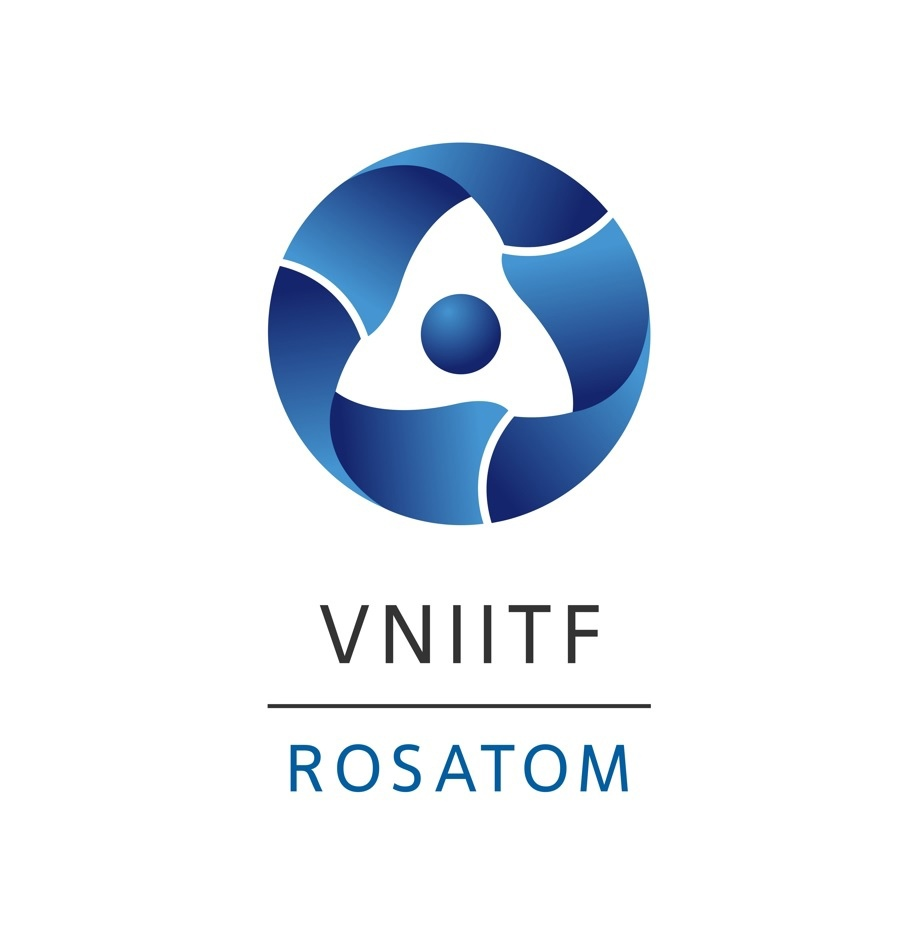
- Type: Federal State Unitary Enterprise
- Founded: 1955
- Headquarters: Snezhinsk, Russia
- Parent: Rosatom
- Website: vniitf.ru

All-Russian Scientific Research Institute Of Technical Physics (VNIITF; Russian: Всероссийский научно-исследовательский институт технической физики) is a research institute based in Snezhinsk, Russia. It was previously also known as NII-1011 (Scientific Research Institute-1011).

Created as a back-up facility for the All-Russian Scientific Research Institute of Experimental Physics at Kremlev, the All-Russian Institute for Theoretical Physics (VNIITF) has at its disposal expertise in the entire spectrum of work connected with the design and development of nuclear weapons, including nuclear physics, high-pressure physics, hydrodynamics, mathematical modelling, design and technological work on nuclear devices, and nuclear effects monitoring. The institute has initiated a number of highly technical conversion projects based on this expertise. It has a collocated experimental plant for production of prototypes designed at the institute.

== History ==
Immediately after the organization of the Institute, Yevgeny Zababakhin, after the departure of Kirill Shchelkin (1960) became a scientific advisor and worked in this position for 25 years until his death.

By the decree of the Presidium of the Supreme Soviet of the USSR dated July 29, 1966 for services in the creation and production of a new specialized technology and for the successful implementation of plans during the years 1959-1965, VNIIP (later "RFNC-VNIITF") was awarded the Order of Lenin.

By the decree of the Presidium of the Supreme Soviet of the USSR on October 16, 1980 for merits in the creation of a new specialty, VNIIP was awarded the Order of the October Revolution. VNIITF was also awarded a certificate of honor by the Government of the Russian Federation in 2010.

In September 1988, the Institute's staff took part in the Joint Verification Experiment of two explosions at nuclear test sites in the United States (Kearsarge, Nevada - August 8) and the USSR (“Sary Shagan,” Semipalatinsk - September 14). The purpose of the experiments was to test the effectiveness of seismic and hydrodynamic control methods proposed by the parties in the framework of negotiations on compliance with the 1974 Treaty on Limiting the Power of Nuclear Weapons Tests. Soviet specialists prepared and implemented an explosion at the Semipalatinsk Test Site, conducting joint control measurements of the power of the explosion with the American side using the gas-dynamic method for determining the explosion energy. They carried out similar control measurements during the experimental explosion at the Nevada test site.

On February 28, 1992, by order of the President of the Russian Federation, No. 88-RPS VNII was transformed into the Russian Federal Nuclear Center or the All-Russian Scientific Research Institute of Technical Physics (RFNC-VNIITF).

In October 1996, VNIITF director Vladimir Nechai shot himself in his office because of the inability to pay back wages to the company's employees.

== Developments ==
A critical attitude was developed for the development of missile defense systems. Many of the institute's activities were carried out in competition with RFNC-VNIIEF. In a number of areas - strategic complexes Navy, cruise missiles, aerial bombs, artillery - work was carried out mainly in RFNC-VNIITF.

Test adits (site 108-k) for RFNC-VNIITF were at the Semipalatinsk test site. In particular, nuclear warheads of interceptor missiles were tested there such as the anti-missile defense system A-135 "Amur".

The majority of nuclear charges, unique in terms of various indicators, were created at RFNC-VNIITF:

- the first thermonuclear charge was adopted (1957).
- put into service nuclear ballistic missile warhead R-13 for a diesel submarine (1960).
- development of the first hydrogen bomb completed (1962).
- the smallest charge was for a 152 mm artillery shell (1975).
- the lightest warhead was for the Strategic Nuclear Forces.

== Institute Directors ==
- 1964—1988 — Lominsky Georgy Pavlovich
- 1988—1996 — Vladimir Zinovievich Nechai
- 1996—1998 — Yevgeny Nikolayevich Avrorin
- 1998—2012 — Georgy Nikolaevich Rykovanov
- 2012 — Mikhail Evgenievich Zheleznov

== Notable Scientists ==
- Leonid Ivanovich Shibarshov — Doctor of Physical and Mathematical Sciences (1991), Lenin Prize Laureate (1980), Honored Scientist of the Russian Federation. (2006)
- Leonid Efremovich Polyansky — Lenin Prize Laureate (1967).
- Felix Fedorovich Zhelobanov — Lenin Prize Laureate.
- Vladimir Emelyanovich Neuvazhaev — Doctor of Physical and Mathematical Sciences, Professor, USSR State Prize Laureate, Honored Scientist of the Russian Federation
- Mikhail Alexandrovich Bibikin — Deputy Chief Designer, USSR State Prize Laureate.

== See also ==
- Bibliography of science and technology in Russia and the Soviet Union
- Soviet atomic bomb project
- All-Russian Scientific Research Institute of Experimental Physics
- NL Dukhov All-Russian Research Institute of Automation
- Tsar Bomba
- Naukograd
- Timeline of nuclear weapons development
- Los Alamos National Laboratory
- Lawrence Livermore National Laboratory
- Sandia National Laboratories
