= Snezhinsk =

Closed town in Chelyabinsk Oblast, Russia

Snezhinsk Снежинск
- Town
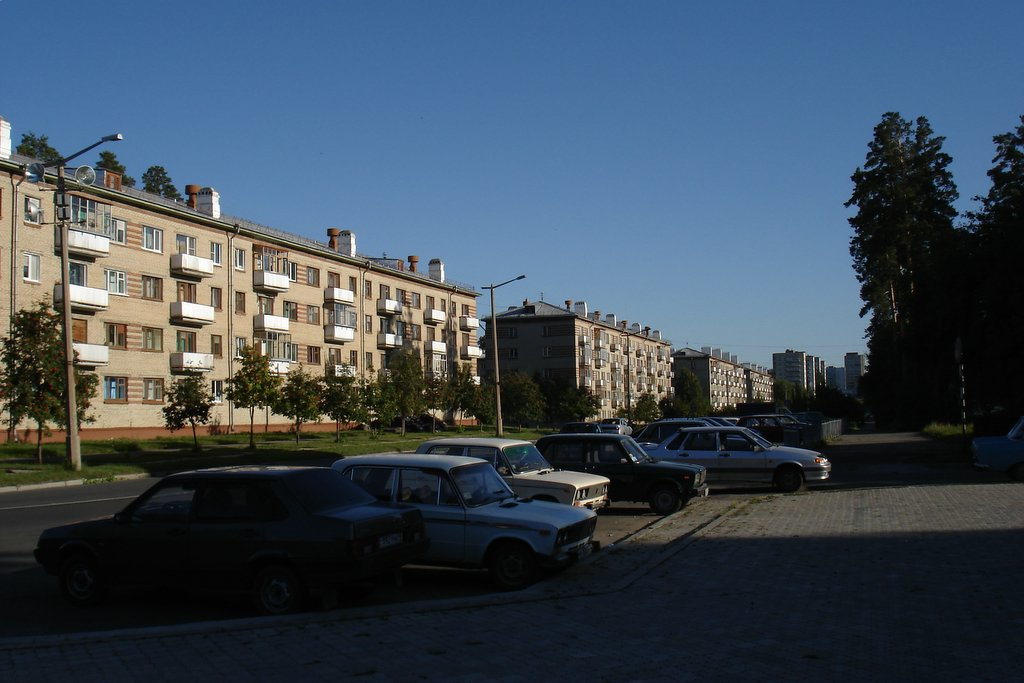
- A street in Snezhinsk

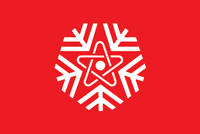
- Flag Coat of arms
- Interactive map of Snezhinsk
- Location of Snezhinsk Snezhinsk (Chelyabinsk Oblast)
- Coordinates: 56°05′N 60°44′E
- Country: Russia
- Federal subject: Chelyabinsk Oblast
- Founded: 1957
- Town status since: 1922
- Elevation: 220 m (720 ft)

Population (2010 Census)
  - Total: 48,810
  - Estimate (2025): 50,711 (+3.9%)
  - Rank: 326th in 2010

Administrative status
  - Subordinated to: Town of Snezhinsk
  - Capital of: Town of Snezhinsk

Municipal status
  - Urban okrug: Snezhinsky Urban Okrug
  - Capital of: Snezhinsky Urban Okrug
- Time zone: UTC+5 (MSK+2)
- Postal code: 456770
- OKTMO ID: 75746000001
- Website: www.snzadm.ru

Snezhinsk (Russian: Сне́жинск, IPA: [ˈsnʲeʐɨnsk]) is a closed town in Chelyabinsk Oblast, Russia. Population: 48,810 (2010 census); 50,451 (2002 census).

== History ==
The settlement began in 1955 as Residential settlement number 2, a name which it had until 1957 when it received town status. It was successively known as Kasli-2 (1957–1959), Chelyabinsk-50 (1959–1966), and Chelyabinsk-70 (1966–1993), after the relatively close city of Chelyabinsk. During the Soviet era, Snezhinsk was a closed city: it was not shown on maps and civil overflights were forbidden.

== Administrative and municipal status ==
Within the framework of administrative divisions, it is, together with two rural localities, incorporated as the Town of Snezhinsk—an administrative unit with the status equal to that of the districts. As a municipal division, the Town of Snezhinsk is incorporated as Snezhinsky Urban Okrug.

== Science ==
Snezhinsk is one of two centers of the Russian nuclear program (the other is Sarov) and is built around a scientific research institute—"All-Russian Scientific Research Institute Of Technical Physics".

== International relations ==
Snezhinsk is a sister city of Livermore, California, United States.

== See also ==
- List of closed cities
