= Nuclear Cities Initiative =

The Nuclear Cities Initiative is an initiative which purports to support the now struggling community and structures of post-USSR nuclear research, aimed at preventing nuclear proliferation.

== History ==
After the fall of the Soviet Union in 1991, concerns about the fate of the Soviet "nuclear cities" fell into the hands of Russia. It was in these secret, highly restricted cities that the Soviet Union designed and produced its nuclear weapons. Due to the great importance of these cities, they were generously funded by the Soviet Union. After the fall of the USSR, the 600,000 residents and workers of these cities were left enormous funding problems over the past decade of political, social, and economic difficulties in Russia.

Despite attempts by Moscow to create self-sustainable infrastructure, the attempts ultimately failed. The Russian-American Nuclear Security Advisory Council (RANSAC), now the Partnership for Global Security, responded by launching the Nuclear Cities Initiative. The initiative was brought about after a 1997 report by the RANSAC recommended action to prevent the "nuclear know-how" of the workers in the cities falling into undesirable hands. United States president Bill Clinton and Russian leader Boris Yeltsin made the deal in September 1998, confirming their approval of the overall concept. In 1999 $15 million were procured from American assistance programs, but a Russian financial crisis and Congress' decision to halve funding to $7.5 million reduced funding to the project.

The project at first worked only on a few of the cities; Russia disallowed development elsewhere until success could be proven in a handful of cities first.

In 2001, the U.S. General Accounting Office criticised the progress made so far, and recommended merging NCI and the Initiatives for Proliferation Prevention into a single programme to improve efficiency. By the end of the Clinton administration, over $30 million had been secured for the project, but this was heavily cut by the following Bush administration who reduced expenditure to $6.6 million. However, the 2002 Energy and Water Development Appropriations Act, which merged IPP and NCI, resulted in a substantial increase in funding to $42 million as it brought funding from the Russian Transition Initiatives budget, which was further increased by $15 million after the September 11 attacks.

=== Russia's ten nuclear cities ===
Russian nuclear cities
'City'	Nuclear facilities	Nature of activity
Sarov, Nizhny Novgorod Oblast (formerly Arzamas-16)	Federal Nuclear Center (VNIIEF) and Avangard Electromechanical Plant	nuclear weapon design, nuclear weapon assembly/disassembly
Snezhinsk, Chelyabinsk Oblast (formerly Chelyabinsk-70)	All-Russian Scientific Research Institute Of Technical Physics (VNIIEF)	nuclear weapon design
Zarechny, Penza Oblast (formerly Penza-19)	Start Production Association (PO Start), Research and Design Institute of Radioelectronic Engineering (NIKIRET)	nuclear weapon assembly/disassembly
Novouralsk, Sverdlovsk Oblast (formerly Sverdlovsk-44)	Ural Electrochemical Combine	uranium enrichment
Lesnoy, Sverdlovsk Oblast (formerly Sverdlovsk-45)	Elektrokhimpribor Combine	nuclear weapon assembly/disassembly, nuclear weapon component fabrication
Ozyorsk, Chelyabinsk Oblast (formerly Chelyabinsk-65)	Mayak Production Association	plutonium production, tritium production, nuclear weapon component fabrication
Tryokhgorny, Chelyabinsk Oblast (formerly Zlatoust-36)	Instrument Making Plant	nuclear weapon assembly/disassembly
Seversk, Tomsk Oblast (formerly Tomsk-7)	Siberian Chemical Combine	plutonium production, uranium enrichment
Zheleznogorsk, Krasnoyarsk Krai (formerly Krasnoyarsk-26)	Mining and Chemical Combine	plutonium production
Zelenogorsk, Krasnoyarsk Krai (formerly Krasnoyarsk-45)	Zelenogorsk Electrochemical Plant	uranium enrichment
