= Companhia Brasileira de Metalurgia e Mineração =

Mining company in Araxá, Brazil

Coordinates: 19°40′00.64″S 46°54′31.25″W

Companhia Brasileira de Metalurgia e Mineração (CBMM)
- Type: Privately held company
- Industry: Metals and Technology
- Founded: 1955
- Headquarters: Araxá, State of Minas Gerais, Brazil
- Area served: Worldwide
- Products: Ferroniobium, niobium oxides, vacuum-grade niobium alloys, niobium metal
- Net income: BRL 1.7 billion (2017)
- Owner: Moreira Salles family (70%); Japanese/Korean consortium (15%); Chinese consortium (15%)
- Number of employees: 1,800
- Subsidiaries: CBMM North America; CBMM Europe; CBMM Asia; CBMM Technology Suisse
- Website: www.cbmm.com

Companhia Brasileira de Metalurgia e Mineração (Portuguese for Brazilian Metallurgy and Mining Company), or CBMM for short, is a Brazilian company that specializes in the processing and technology of niobium, extracted from its pyrochlore mine near the city of Araxá, in the Brazilian state of Minas Gerais.

CBMM is by far the world's largest producer of niobium metal and its alloys, providing over 80% of the world's supply. Like the other producers of this metal, the company does not sell raw niobium ore, only ferroniobium, other niobium alloys and oxides, and the pure metal, all produced in its facilities next to the open-pit mine. As of 2016, CBMM produces 90,000 tonnes of ferroniobium equivalent per year, which is slated to be increased to 150,000 tonnes/year. The Araxá ore deposit is large enough to supply the market demand for at least 200 years at current consumption rates. CBMM was the world's first mining and metallurgy company to be ISO 14001-certified.

CBMM's niobium products are sold to over 50 countries. The company has its business headquarters, manufacturing facilities and technology center next to its mine in Araxá, and an office for sales and application technologies in São Paulo, as well as sales subsidiaries in the Pittsburgh area, Amsterdam, Beijing, Shanghai and Singapore, and warehouses in Russia, India, Sweden, South Korea, Spain, Italy, Canada and Japan. CBMM also has a technology subsidiary in Geneva, CBMM Technology Suisse.

The company was founded in 1955 and since 1965 has been controlled by the Moreira Salles family, one of Brazil's wealthiest, former owners of the Unibanco banking conglomerate. In 2011, a Chinese group acquired a 15% stake in CBMM, and a Japanese-South Korean consortium a further 15%.
