= Vitaliy Konovalov =

Soviet engineer and politician (1932–2013)

Minister of Atomic Energy and Industry
- In office July 1989 – 24 August 1991
- Premier: Nikolai Ryzhkov
- Preceded by: Nikolai Lukonin
- Succeeded by: Office abolished

Personal details
- Born: Vitaliy Fedorovich Konovalov; 14 September 1932 Sverdlovsk, Soviet Union
- Died: 9 May 2013 (aged 80)
- Party: Communist Party
- Education: Ural Polytechnic Institute

Vitaliy Fedorovich Konovalov (14 September 1932 – 9 May 2013) was a Soviet politician who served as the minister of atomic energy and industry. In 1998 he established a nuclear fuel cycle company, JSC TVEL.

== Early life and education ==
Konovalov was born in Sverdlovsk on 14 September 1932. He was a graduate of Ural Polytechnic Institute where he obtained a degree in technical engineering in 1956. He obtained a PhD in engineering science.

== Career ==
Following his graduation Konovalov began to work in the nuclear industry in 1956. He was a member of the Communist Party. In 1975 he was appointed director of the Chepetskiy Mechanical Plant in Udmurtia. From 1979 he headed a machine-building plant in Elektrostal. In March 1986, he joined the Ministry of Medium Machine Building where he served as the deputy minister after working in various positions. In July 1989 he was appointed minister of atomic energy and industry and was in office until 1991.

In 1996 Konovalov founded the TVEL, a nuclear fuel cycle company, which he headed until 2000.

== Personal life and death ==
Konovalov was a laureate of the Soviet State Prize and the Peter the Great Prize. He died on 9 May 2013.

== Memory ==
A memorial plaque in memory of Vitaliy Konovalov was installed at the Ulba Metallurgical Plant in 2014.
