= Zelenogorsk =

Zelenogorsk (Russian: Зеленогорск) may refer to:

Urban localities

- Zelenogorsk, Krasnoyarsk Krai, a closed town in Krasnoyarsk Krai
- Zelenogorsk, Saint Petersburg, a municipal town in Kurortny District of the federal city of St. Petersburg

Rural localities

- Zelenogorsk, Mari El Republic, a settlement in Zelenogorsky Rural Okrug of Morkinsky District in the Mari El Republic; 56°31′N 48°47′E

== See also ==
- Zelenogorsk Electrochemical Plant in Krasnoyarsk Krai
- Zelenogorsk (Pallas's cat)
