= Rosatom =

Russian state-owned nuclear technologies company

State Atomic Energy Corporation Rosatom

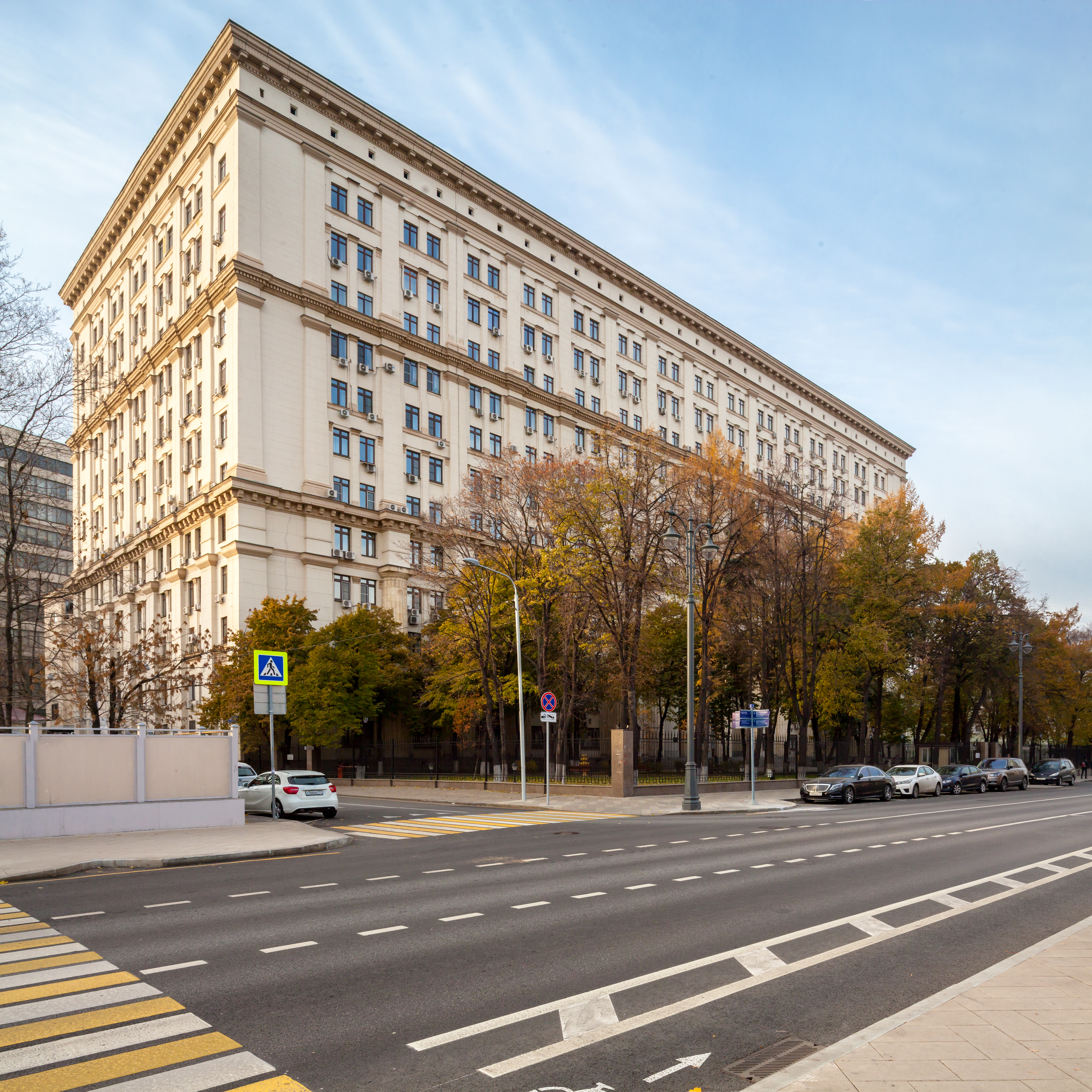
- Rosatom's headquarters at Bolshaya Ordynka Street in Moscow
- Native name: Государственная корпорация по атомной энергии «Росатом»
- Type: State-owned
- Industry: Nuclear power Wind power Hydrogen fuel
- Predecessor: Federal Agency on Atomic Energy
- Founded: 1 December 2007; 18 years ago
- Founder: Vladimir Putin by signed law
- Headquarters: Moscow, Russia
- Area served: Worldwide
- Key people: Alexey Likhachev (General Director or CEO)
- Products: Nuclear reactors Nuclear fuel Uranium mining Uranium enrichment Nuclear decommissioning Nuclear medicine Wind power Hydrogen fuel Additive manufacturing Composites
- Revenue: ₽1,207.4 billion (2020)
- Total assets: ₽4,722.4 billion (2020)
- Owner: Russian government
- Number of employees: 371,000 (2020)
- Subsidiaries: See organization
- Website: rosatom.ru/en/

State Atomic Energy Corporation Rosatom, commonly known as Rosatom (Russian: Государственная корпорация по атомной энергии «Росатом», romanized: Gosudarstvennaya korporatsiya po atomnoy energii "Rosatom", IPA: [rɐsˈatəm]), is a Russian state corporation headquartered in Moscow that specializes in nuclear energy, nuclear non-energy goods and high-tech products. It was established in 2007 and comprises more than 350 enterprises, including scientific research organizations, a nuclear weapons complex, and the world's only nuclear icebreaker fleet.

The organization is the largest electricity generating company in Russia, producing 217.4 TWh of electricity, 20.28% of the country's total electricity production. The corporation ranks first in overseas nuclear power plant construction, responsible for 90% of global nuclear technology exports: 22 nuclear power plant units, at different stages of development, in 7 countries, as of December 2024. Rosatom also manufactures equipment, produces isotopes for nuclear medicine, carries out research, and conducts material studies. It also produces supercomputers and software as well as different nuclear and non-nuclear products. Rosatom plans to further develop renewable energy and wind power. Four nuclear power plants are being built in Russia: The Kursk NPP-2 project includes four power units with Russian VVER-TOI reactor installations. Power Units No. 7 and No. 8 of the Leningrad NPP-2, equipped with VVER-1200 reactors, are being constructed to replace Power Units No. 3 and No. 4 with RBMK-1000 reactors. The Smolensk NPP-2 is a station designed to replace the retiring capacities of the operating units of the Smolensk NPP. The construction of Power Units No. 1 and No. 2 of the Smolensk NPP-2 is planned under the General Scheme for the Placement of Electric Power Facilities until 2035. Rosatom has a 38% world market share and in 2019 led in global uranium enrichment services (36%) and covers 17% of the global nuclear fuel market.

The state corporation is authorized on behalf of the state to fulfill Russia's international obligations in the field of the use of nuclear energy and of non-proliferation of nuclear materials. Rosatom is also involved with large-scale projects such as ITER and FAIR.

As of February 2021, the total portfolio orders of Rosatom reached $250 billion. According to the 2023 corporate report, its 10-year foreign order portfolio stood at $127.1 billion, while revenue reached $16.2 billion. The 10-year order portfolio for new products stood at ₽1,110.1 billion while revenue reached ₽261.1 billion.

Certain divisions and business lines of Rosatom were reoriented during wartime toward tasks directly or indirectly connected with military needs: the production of components and services demanded by the Ministry of Defense, increased involvement in projects of geopolitical significance, as well as the reinforcement of internal financial flows through areas “untypical” for the civilian nuclear sector.

The involvement of Rosatom in military and paramilitary operations increases systemic nuclear security risks — from uncontrolled changes in the operation of nuclear power plants to threats during the transportation and storage of nuclear fuel and radioactive waste.

== History ==
=== Origins and establishment ===
Several Soviet and Russian government entities with different tasks are among the Rosatom predecessors. On 26 June 1953, the Council of Ministers transformed the First Main Directorate in charge of nuclear weapons program into the Ministry of Medium Machine Building (MinSredMash). The ministry was entrusted with the development of the civic nuclear power program. In 1989, Minsredmash and the Ministry of Atomic Energy merged to form the Ministry of Nuclear Engineering and Industry of the USSR.

The Ministry for Atomic Energy of the Russian Federation [(Russian: Министерство по атомной энергии Российской Федерации, also known as Minatom (Russian: Минaтом)] was established as a successor to the Russian part of the Ministry of Nuclear Engineering and Industry of the USSR on 29 January 1992, after the dissolution of the Soviet Union. The newly created ministry received about 80% of the enterprises of the union department, including 9 nuclear power plants with 28 power units. Under this name, the ministry existed until 9 March 2004, when it was transformed into the Federal Agency on Atomic Energy.

On 1 December 2007, Russian President Vladimir Putin signed a law adopted by the Federal Assembly under which the Federal Atomic Energy Agency was to be abolished, and its powers and assets were to be transferred to the newly created "State Atomic Energy Corporation Rosatom." On 12 December of the same year, the agency transformed into a state corporation. In 2015, the company's revenue amounted to 126 billion rubles.

=== Involvement in international markets ===
Between 2000 and 2015, Rosatom "was the supplier in around half of all international agreements on nuclear power plant construction, reactor, and fuel supply, decommissioning or waste". Russia has various diplomatic ties with different countries via nuclear energy diplomacy. Some form of formalized agreement exists with 54 countries as of 2023, although some plans for Russian-built nuclear power plants were canceled after the Russian invasion of Ukraine.

=== Wind power investments ===
In 2017, Rosatom decided to invest in wind power, believing that rapid cost reductions in the renewable industry will become a competitive threat to nuclear power, and started to build wind turbine. Rosatom was also concerned that nuclear export opportunities were becoming exhausted. In October, Rosatom was reported to be considering postponing commissioning new nuclear plants in Russia due to excess generation capacity and that new nuclear electricity prices are higher than for existing plant. The Russian government is considering reducing support for new nuclear under its support contracts, called Dogovor Postavki Moshnosti (DPM), which guarantees developers a return on investment through increased payments from consumers for 20 years. As of 2023, Rosatom has commissioned nine wind farms with a total capacity of 1 GW. Electricity generation from wind power plants reached 2.27 billion kWh by the end of 2023. In 2023, a contract was signed for the construction of Rosatom's first international wind farm in Kyrgyzstan.

=== 2017 ruthenium plume controversy ===
Ruthenium, a byproduct of uranium-235 fission, is used by nuclear monitoring sites as an indicator of a nuclear accident. In October 2017, a plume of ruthenium-106 was detected by multiple laboratories throughout Europe. Rosatom denied that there had been a leak or accident at its nuclear sites and suggested that the plume was caused by a satellite burning upon reentry. A 2019 study ruled out the satellite hypothesis. By analyzing air sample data from multiple monitoring sites, the scientists determined that the most likely cause of the plume was a fire or explosion while attempting to process ruthenium into cerium-144. Rosatom continues to deny that there was a leak or explosion.

=== Expansion plans ===
On 28 June 2017, The Financial Times criticized Rosatom for lack of transparency regarding an alleged expansionist agenda through its role as a "Kremlin-controlled company". On 20 March 2018, this criticism was underlined by the Bellona Foundation, who focused on the scarce data available on Rosatom's progress in Sudan.

On 20 August 2020, Rosatom marked the 75th anniversary of the Russian nuclear industry. As part of the celebration, Rosatom launched its rebranding campaign "United Rosatom," which made subsidiaries in the nuclear industry utilize the Rosatom's Möbius strip logo. In 2020, Rosatom set a goal of tripling its revenue to ₽4 trillion by 2030, 40% of which is set to come from new lines of business, with primarily focus on sustainable tech. In 2020, Rosatom approved an updated strategy with the intent to branch into 100 new business areas, including nuclear medicine, composites, wind energy, hydrogen, waste management, additive technology, and production of hydrogen.

=== Impact of the Russian invasion of Ukraine ===
Nations supporting Ukraine following the 2022 Russian invasion sanctioned Rosatom and its subsidiaries. On 24 February 2023 the Foreign, Commonwealth and Development Office of the United Kingdom announced direct sanctions against Rosatom and its executives. The United States Department of the Treasury Office of Foreign Assets Control sanctioned Rosatom's carbon fibre-producing UMATEX subsidiary group of companies in Russia and the Czech Republic pursuant to Executive Order 14024, as part of a drive against Russia's suppliers of carbon fibers. The Foundation for Defense of Democracies recommends a blanket ban in the US on Rosatom. It said the total revenue accrued by Rosatom from US and European sources was around $2 billion in FY2023 and considered this unacceptable. The European Union dares not sanction Rosatom because of the importance of the nuclear fuel and equipment which they provide to the continent, although the European Parliament did call for sanctions as lately as 2 February 2023.

Within the next two days after Russian military forces occupied Ukraine's Chernobyl Nuclear Power Plant on 24 February 2022, Rosatom employees had gained unauthorized access to the plant, threatened the Ukrainian personnel, and demanded the plant's manuals, procedures and other documentation.

Since 12 March 2022, once Russian military forces occupied Ukraine's Zaporizhzhia Nuclear Power Plant (ZNPP), Rosatom employees have gained access and set a base there without permission of the plant's owner Energoatom. Rosatom engineers have demanded documentation and manuals on the plant's operation. Rosatom spokeswoman said that its employees are present at the ZNPP to ensure the safety of the plant and are not involved in its management or security.

On 29 September 2022, the International Atomic Energy Agency was told by a Ukrainian ambassador that Rosatom had sent more officials to the ZNPP to enforce the change in ownership from Ukraine to Russia and to give the plant employees two weeks to apply for work with Rosatom. According to western media outlet Bloomberg, allowing Russia to claim ownership of the ZNPP would represent the biggest nuclear theft in history.

In an essay written in July 2023, it was alleged that Rosatom had supplied fuel to 78 power reactors in 15 countries, and controlled more than a third of the global nuclear fuel market. Cameco, Orano and ConverDyn were listed as its main competitors.

On 10 January 2025, the United States sanctioned senior officials of Rosatom, including chief executive officer Alexey Likhachev and members of Rosatom's management board, for their involvement in Russia's nuclear weapons complex and defense sector, nuclear power plant construction exports, development of advanced technologies and materials, non-uranium extractive industries and associated businesses, and malign activities, including the occupation of the ZNPP in Ukraine. As a result of the sanctions-related actions, all property and interests in property of the sanctioned persons that are in the United States or in the possession or control of U.S. persons are blocked and must be reported to the Department of the Treasury's Office of Foreign Assets Control (OFAC).

== Organization ==
As of early 2021, Rosatom included 356 of various organizational and legal forms. Some belong to the enterprises of the nuclear power complex, which comprises organizations of nuclear energy, nuclear engineering, and the nuclear fuel cycle, such as enterprises for the exploration and production of natural uranium, conversion and enrichment of uranium, production of nuclear fuel, electricity and equipment, development of new technologies for the nuclear fuel and gas centrifuge platform. Others belong to the growing number of new businesses outside of nuclear power, including wind energy, composite materials, additive technologies, and nuclear medicine, among others. The civilian assets of the Russian nuclear industry are concentrated within Rosatom's holding company Atomenergoprom, which unites 222 enterprises as of December 2020.

The Rosatom companies are integrated into multiple divisions:

=== Mining division ===
The holding company of the Rosatom mining division is JSC Atomredmetzoloto, which consolidates Russian uranium mining assets. Key daughter companies include JSC Khiagda and JSC Dalur. Uranium One is a separate global mining company that operates directly under Rosatom with a diverse portfolio of assets in Kazakhstan, United States, and Tanzania.

=== Fuel division ===
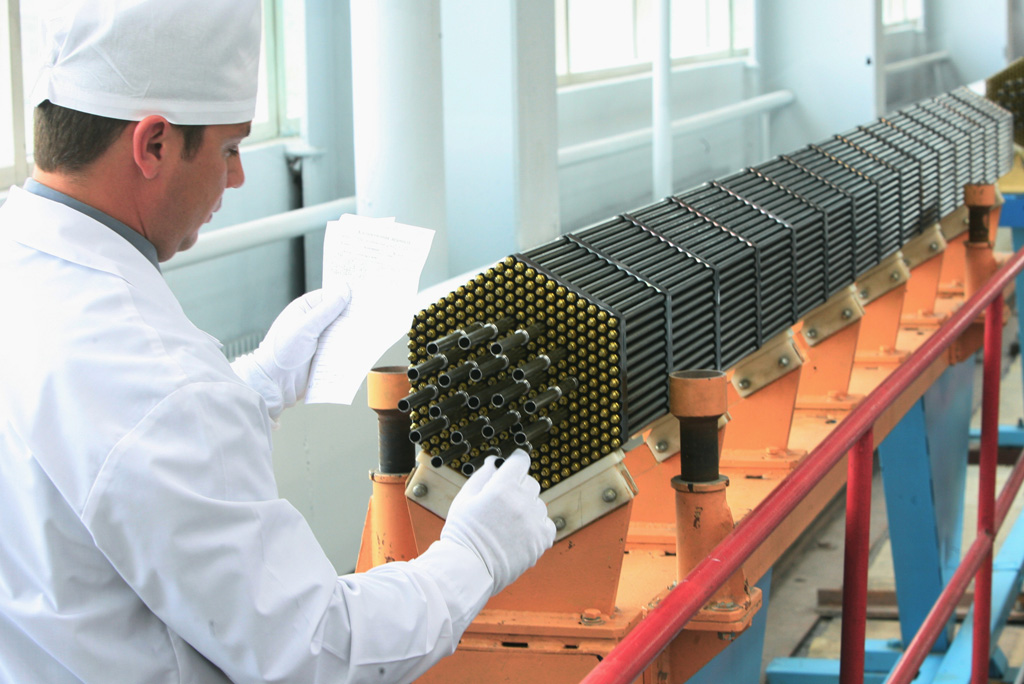
Work on a fuel cassette of the nuclear power reactor at the Novosibirsk Chemical Concentrates Plant, a TVEL subsidiary

The managing company of the Rosatom fuel division is JSC TVEL, which is a leading organization on the global nuclear fuel cycle front-end market and the only supplier of nuclear fuel for Russian NPPs and the nuclear-powered icebreaker fleet.

Key daughter companies include Bochvar National Research Institute for Inorganic Materials, Siberian Chemical Combine, and Chepetskiy Mechanical Plant.

The division's tasks include the fabrication of nuclear fuel, conversion and enrichment of uranium, and the production of gas centrifuges.

Uranium enrichment is carried out at four TVEL Fuel Company plants, including Angarsk Electrochemical Plant in Angarsk, Irkutsk Oblast, Zelenogorsk Electrochemical Plant in Zelenogorsk, Krasnoyarsk Krai, Ural Electrochemical Plant in Novouralsk, Sverdlovsk Oblast, and the Siberian Chemical Plant in Seversk, Tomsk Oblast. Uranium is enriched using an advanced gas centrifuge technology to separate uranium isotopes. Depleted uranium hexafluoride is converted to an oxide form at the W-ECP unit of Zelenogorsk Electrochemical Plant.

Nuclear fuel is produced at Rosatom's Machine-building plant (JSC MSZ) and Novosibirsk Chemical Concentrates Plant (JSC NCCP). The plants produce UO_{2}-based (enriched fresh and reprocessed uranium) nuclear fuel for all models of Russian power and research reactors, as well as for many foreign power and research reactor models and for Russian ship-based power installations. The development of accident-tolerant fuel for VVER and PWR reactors has now entered the stage of testing.

MOX fuel for fast sodium reactors is produced at the Mining and Chemical Combine, while uranium-plutonium mixed fuel will be produced at the Siberian Chemical Plant, which is currently under construction. A uranium-plutonium fuel REMIX (regenerated mixture) is being tested for VVER reactors; its commercial production is expected to take place at the Mining and Chemical Combine.

SNF reprocessing is carried out at the Mayak Production Association at the RT-1 plant. The plant is currently processing the spent nuclear fuel (of various compositions) from power reactors (BN-350, VVER-440, BN-600, RBMK-1000, VVER-1000; BN-MOX), from the research reactors of Russian and foreign scientific centers, and from the reactors of submarine and surface naval fleet transport power plants.

=== Mechanical engineering division ===
The managing company is JSC Atomenergomash. It is one of Russia's largest groups of mechanical engineering enterprises offering a full range of solutions for the design, manufacture, and supply of equipment for the nuclear power industry. The division comprises more than 10 production sites, including production enterprises, engineering centers, and research organizations in Russia, Ukraine, the Czech Republic, and Hungary.

According to the group's own data, 14% of nuclear power plants in the world and 40% of thermal power stations in the CIS and the Baltic states use the holding equipment. In addition, the division is the largest producer of equipment for the VVER reactor and the world's only producer of the fast-neutron reactor (BN reactor). Its enterprises are also responsible for the design and manufacturing of reactors for SMR nuclear power plants, both onshore and offshore, as well as nuclear icebreakers. Key companies include OKB Gidropress, OKBM Afrikantov, JSC Machine-Building Factory of Podolsk, and AEM-technology.

=== Engineering division ===
The managing company is JSC ASE EC, which has extensive capabilities for managing the construction of complex engineering facilities. The main business areas of the division include the design and construction of large NPPs in Russia and abroad, and developing digital technologies for managing complex engineering facilities based on the Multi-D platform. Key companies include JSC Atomenergoproekt, and JSC ATOMPROEKT.

=== Power engineering division ===
The managing company is JSC Rosenergoatom. It is the only NPP operator in Russia and a key player in the Russian electricity market. Its main business areas include power and heat generation at NPPs and acting as the operator of nuclear facilities (nuclear power plants), radiation sources, and facilities storing nuclear materials and radioactive substances. Key companies include all Russian NPPs, JSC AtomEnergoRemont, JSC AtomEnergoSbyt, and TITAN-2 construction holding.

=== Back-end division ===
The managing company is JSC Federal Center for Nuclear and Radiation Safety. It is dedicated to a centralized system for management of spent nuclear fuel and radioactive waste, as well as decommissioning of hazardous nuclear and radiological facilities. Key companies include FSUE Mining and Chemical Combine, FSUE Radon, NO RWM.

=== R&D division ===
The managing company is JSC Science and Innovations. Key companies include Russian Scientific Center (RSC) – A.I. Leipunskiy IPPE, NII NPO Luch, and the Research Institute of Atomic Reactors.

=== Northern Sea Route ===
The development of the Northern Sea Route has become a Rosatom priority after the company was appointed its infrastructure operator in late 2018. Rosatom seeks to organize ship navigation within the NSR, develop the infrastructure of seaports, including energy, create a navigation safety system, as well as navigational and hydrographic support. In addition, several Rosatom entities are involved in the development of international transit sea freight traffic along the Northern Sea Transit Corridor. Key companies include FSUE Atomflot, Directorate of the Northern Sea Route, Rusatom Cargo.

Documented Incidents

In the fall of 2024 alone, at least three major accidents happened on the NSR:

On 5 September, research vessel Akademik Nikolay Strakhov lost propulsion in the Kara Sea due to engine failure; help arrived only two weeks later, and the ship was towed to Murmansk by 27 September.

On 6 October, the dredger Nordic Giant ran aground near Teriberka (Murmansk region); refloating only began 41 days later, on 16 November.

On 30 October, the tanker Ammolite lost engine control in Ugolnaya Bay (Chukotka) due to its propeller becoming entangled in fishing nets. The tanker, carrying about 4,000 tons of oil products, waited 12 days for assistance in stormy, extremely cold conditions.

These incidents illustrate both the operational vulnerability of vessels on the NSR and the weakness of the emergency response infrastructure.

=== Wind power division ===
In 2017, Rosatom decided to invest in wind turbine manufacturing, believing that rapid cost reductions in the renewable industry will become a competitive threat to nuclear power. Russia had recently offered subsidies for domestically built renewable technology. The managing company is JSC NovaWind. This Rosatom's division concentrates its efforts in advanced areas of wind energy generation technology. Key companies include WindSGC, WindSGC-2, and Atompowerindustry Trade. As per ROSATOM has commissioned a total of nine wind farms with a total capacity of 1 GW. In 2023, WPPs generated 2.27 billion kWh of electricity.

=== Nuclear medicine division ===
The managing company is JSC Rusatom Healthcare. It has been historically developed at various enterprises of the Russian nuclear industry. In 2017, Rosatom established the division to bring together assets and expertise in healthcare. The nuclear medicine division is in charge of nuclear medicine, manufacturing and distribution of radioisotope products and radiation sterilization equipment, as well as creation of integrated turnkey solutions for medicine. Key companies include JSC Isotope and NIITFA. In February 2022, Rusatom Healthcare acquired 25,001% of shares of Medscan group, the rest of shares still being hold by its major shareholder, Yevgeny Tugolukov. More than 70% of all items in the global product line of medical isotopes are produced by Rosatom, which fully meets the needs of the Russian market and exports isotope products to 50 countries worldwide.

=== Advanced materials and technologies division ===
JSC UMATEX a subsidiary, is engaged in production of carbon fibre and fibre-based items, as well as R&D and engineering support to its partners. The other subsidiaries involved are JSC Khimprominzhiniring, and LLC ALABUGA-FIBRE.

=== Digital products division ===
The managing company is the Digitalization Unit of Rosatom, which is engaged in solving tasks in three main areas:

The participation in the digitalization of Russia, as Rosatom is the center of competences of the Federal Project Digital Technologies within the National Program Digital Economy, the development of digital products for nuclear power and beyond and the internal digitalization of the Russian nuclear industry, making it independent from foreign technologies in critical areas.

=== Infrastructure solutions division ===
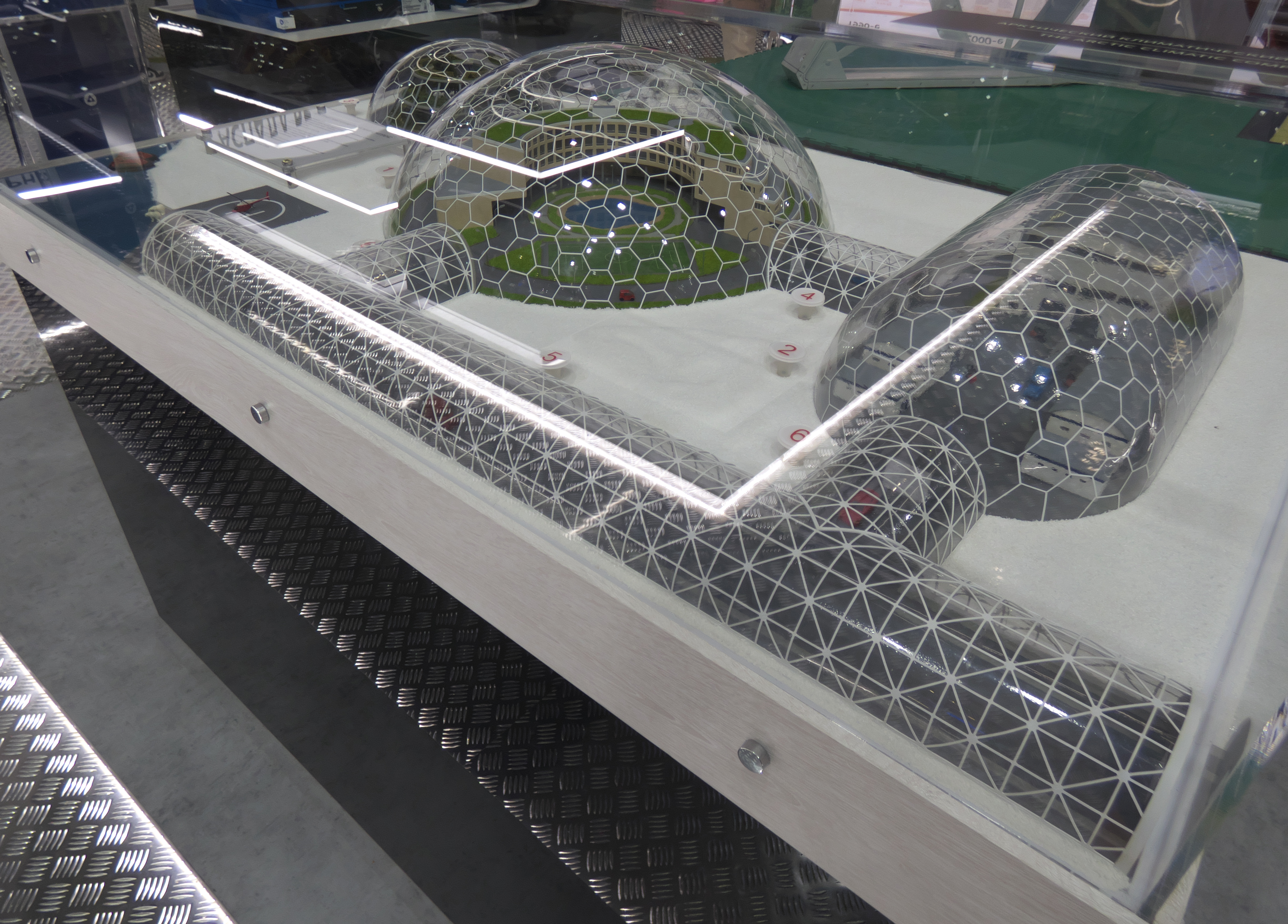
Arctic climatic complex presented at the "Army-2022" exhibition

The managing company is JSC Rusatom Infrastructure Solutions. The company develops, builds, modernizes, maintains water supply, water purification and water treatment facilities for energy, petrochemical, food, and other industries.

=== Additive manufacturing division ===
The managing company is Rusatom Additive Technologies. It connects together the scientific and production companies of Rosatom in order to develop the area of additive production in Russia. It controls design and production of 3D-printers, additive powders, complete sets, software, and 3D-printing services.

=== Energy storage systems division ===
The managing company is LLC RENERA, which is engaged in the development of lithium-ion traction batteries for electric transport and fixed systems for energy accumulation, as well as products for emergency and uninterruptible power supply and storage systems for renewable energy.

=== Process control systems and electrical engineering division ===
The managing company is JSC Rusatom Automated Control Systems. It builds comprehensive solutions for automation of production processes, manufactures and supplies electrical equipment, designs and constructs electricity supply facilities.

=== Environmental solutions division ===
The managing company is FSUE Federal Environmental Operator.

== Operations ==
=== Nuclear power plants ===
The management company Rosenergoatom operates all of Russia's nuclear power plants and represents the electric power division of the state corporation Rosatom. As of December 2022, 35 nuclear power plant units and one floating nuclear heat and power plant unit with a total installed capacity of 29.6 GW are in operation. The total electricity generation by nuclear power plants in 2022 amounted to 223.4 billion kWh.

==== In operation ====
Nuclear Power Plants within Russia

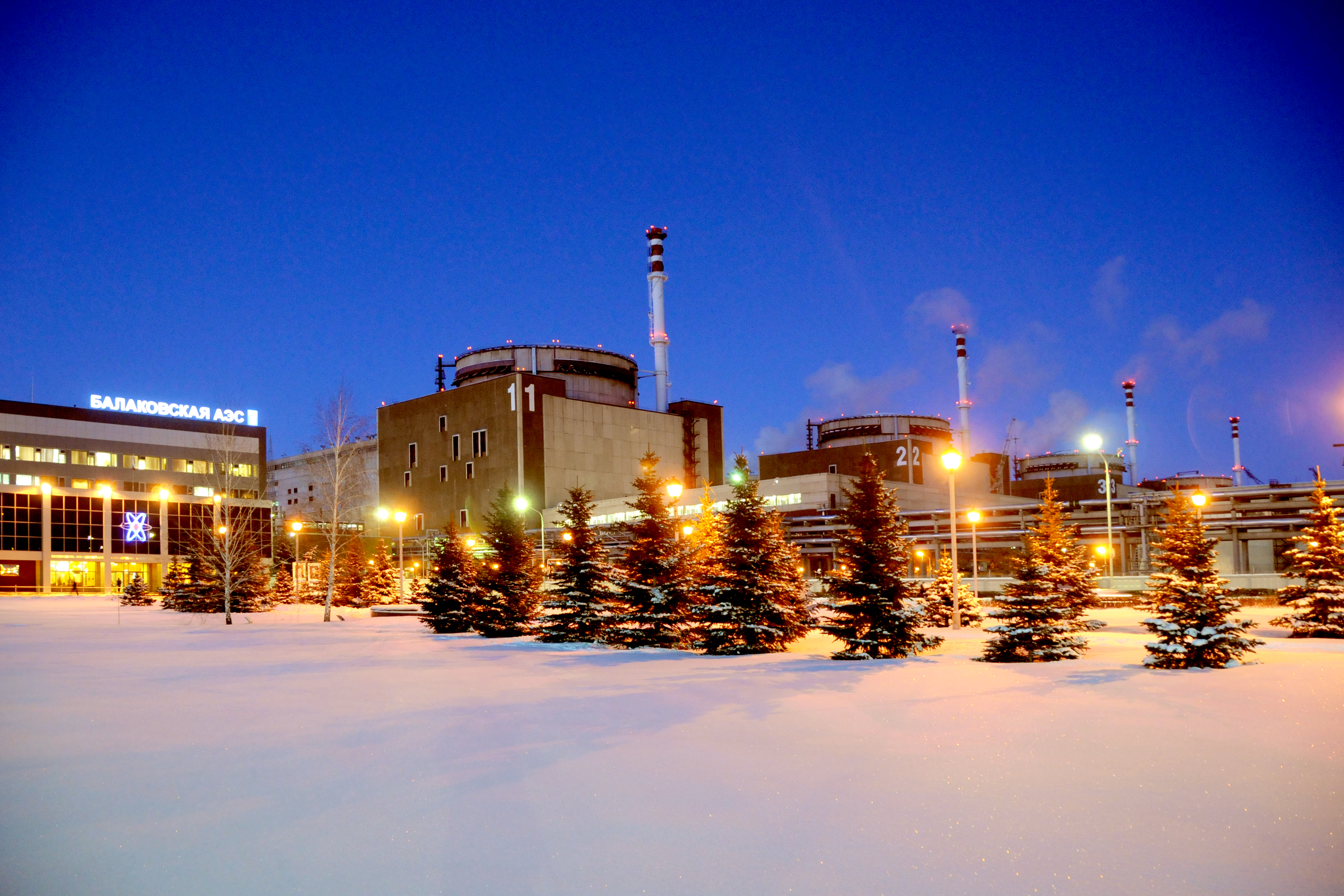
Balakovo

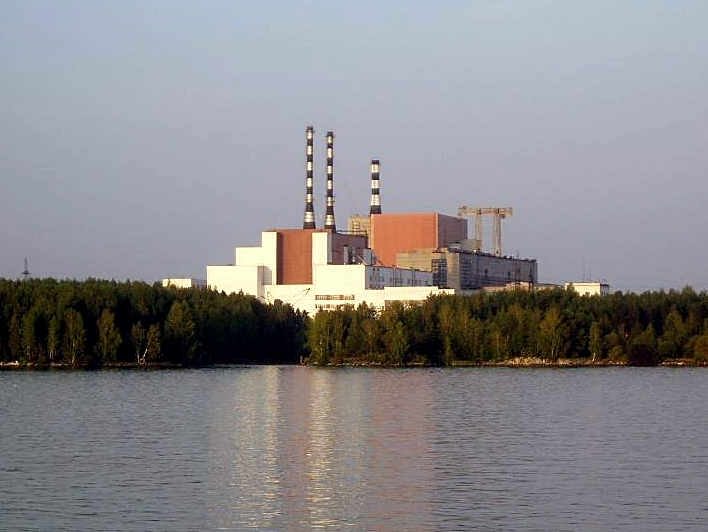
Beloyarsk

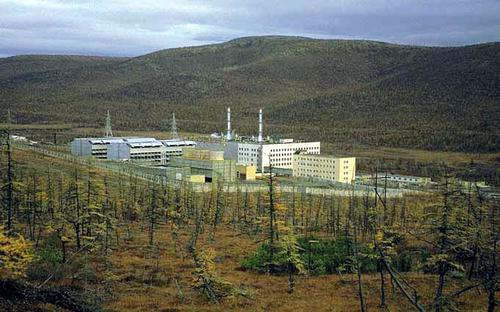
Bilibino

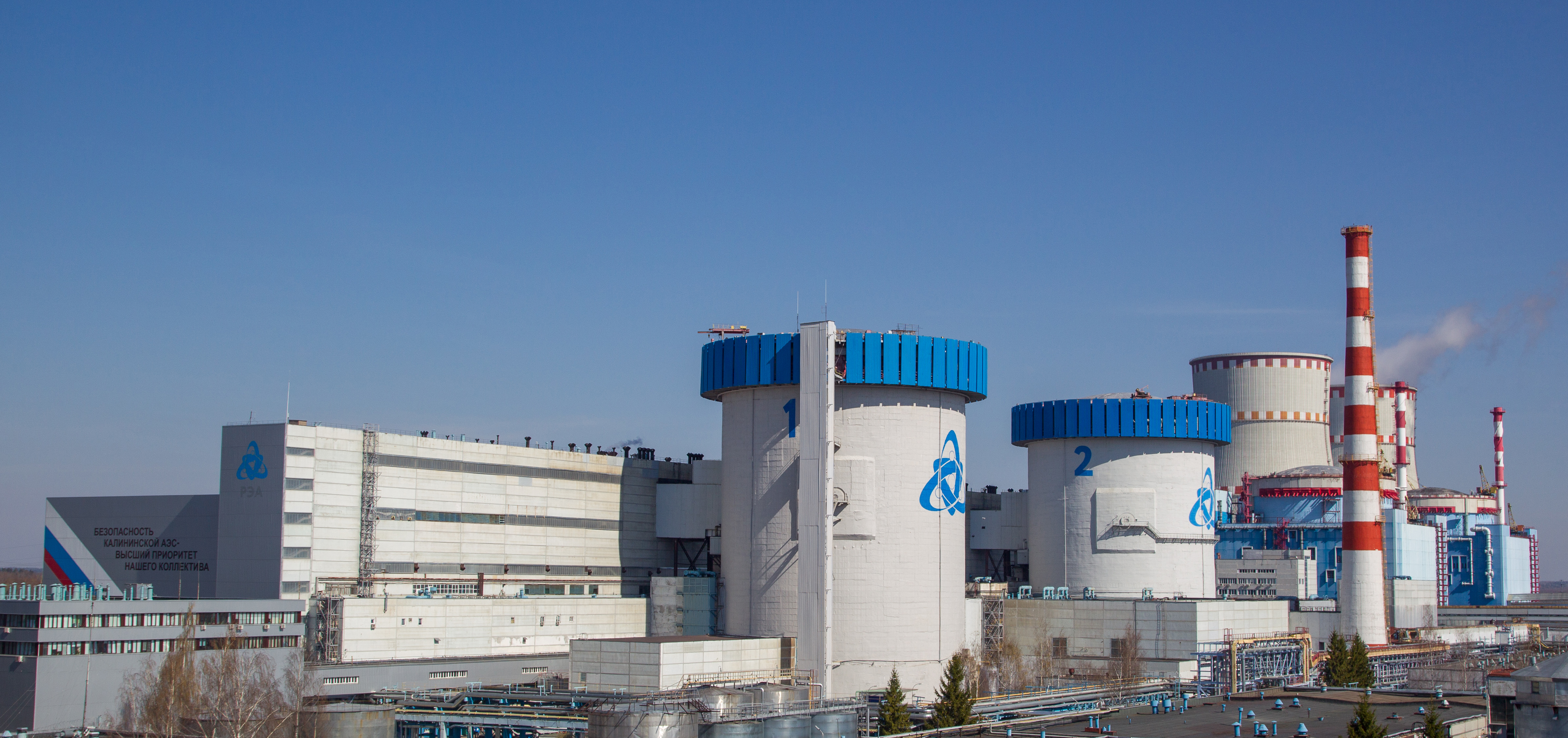
Kalinin

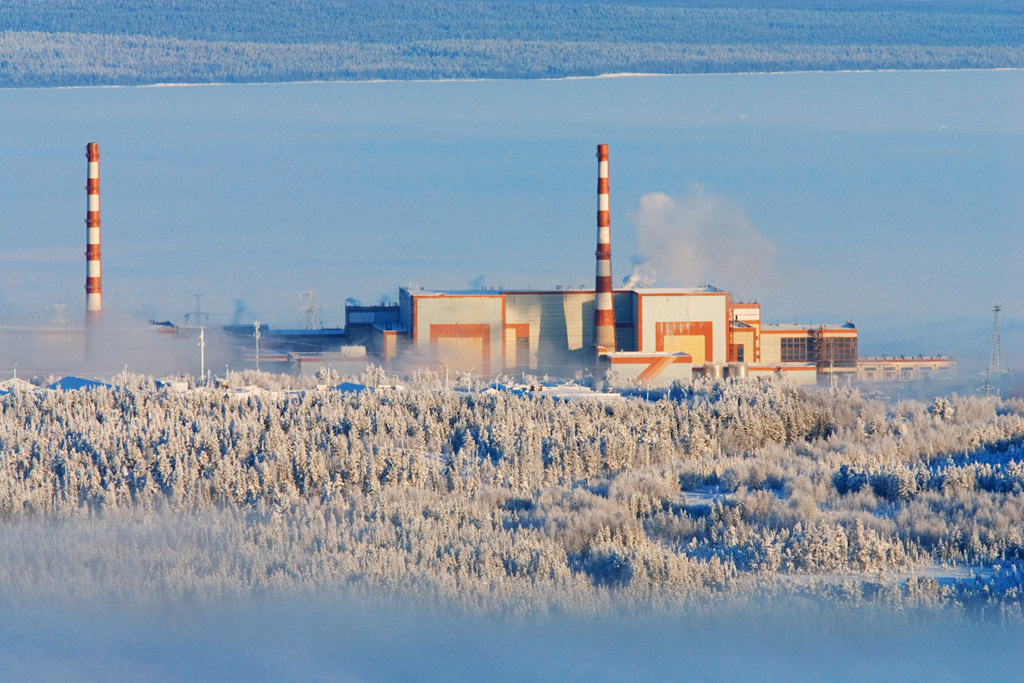
Kola

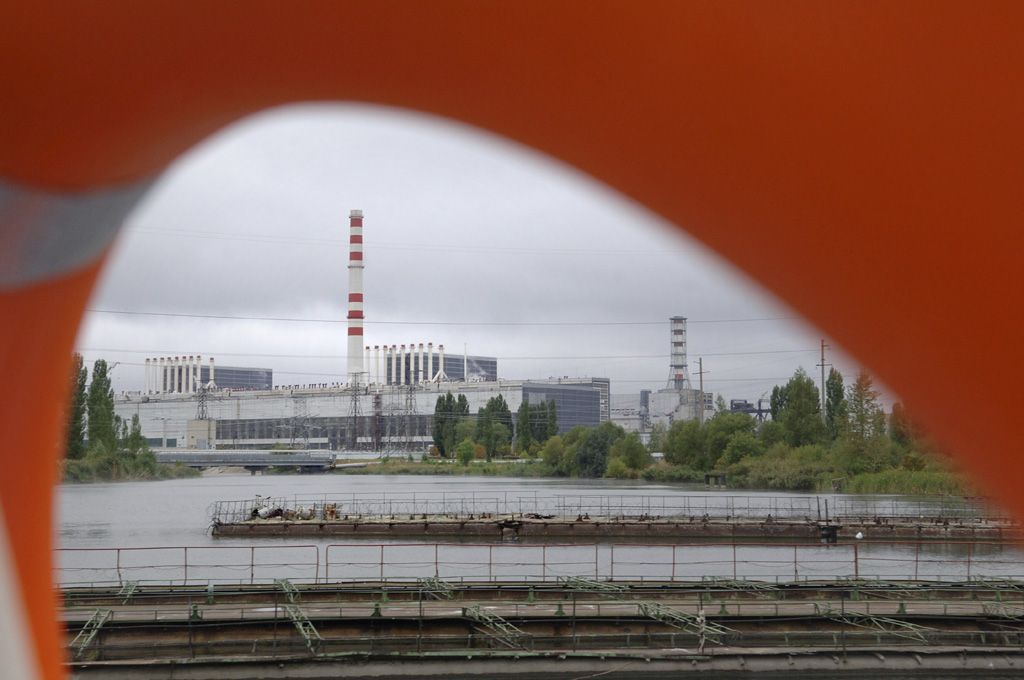
Kursk

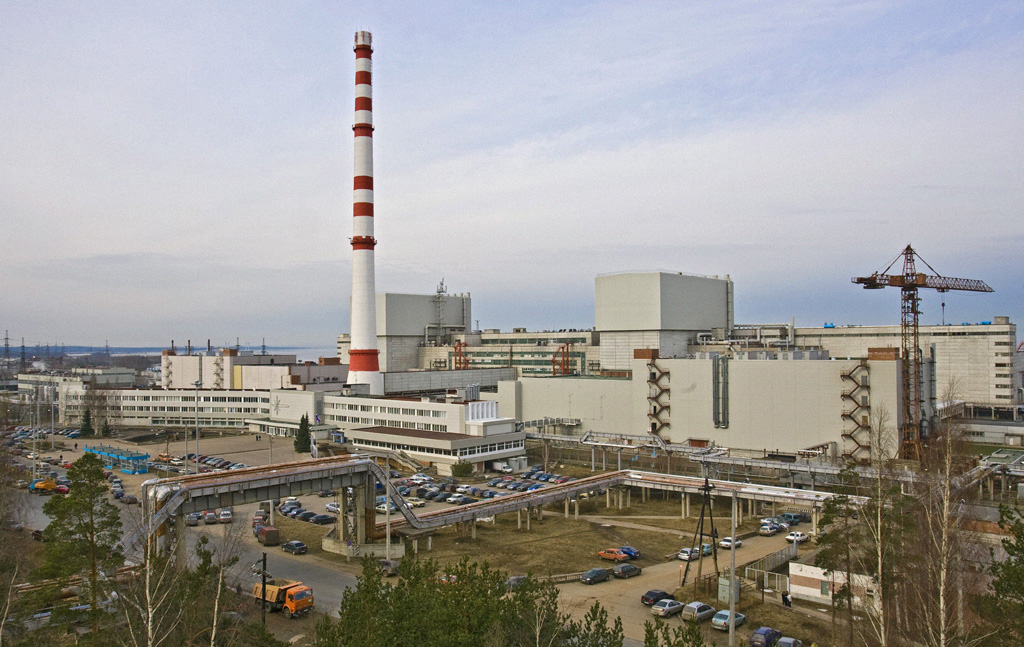
Leningrad

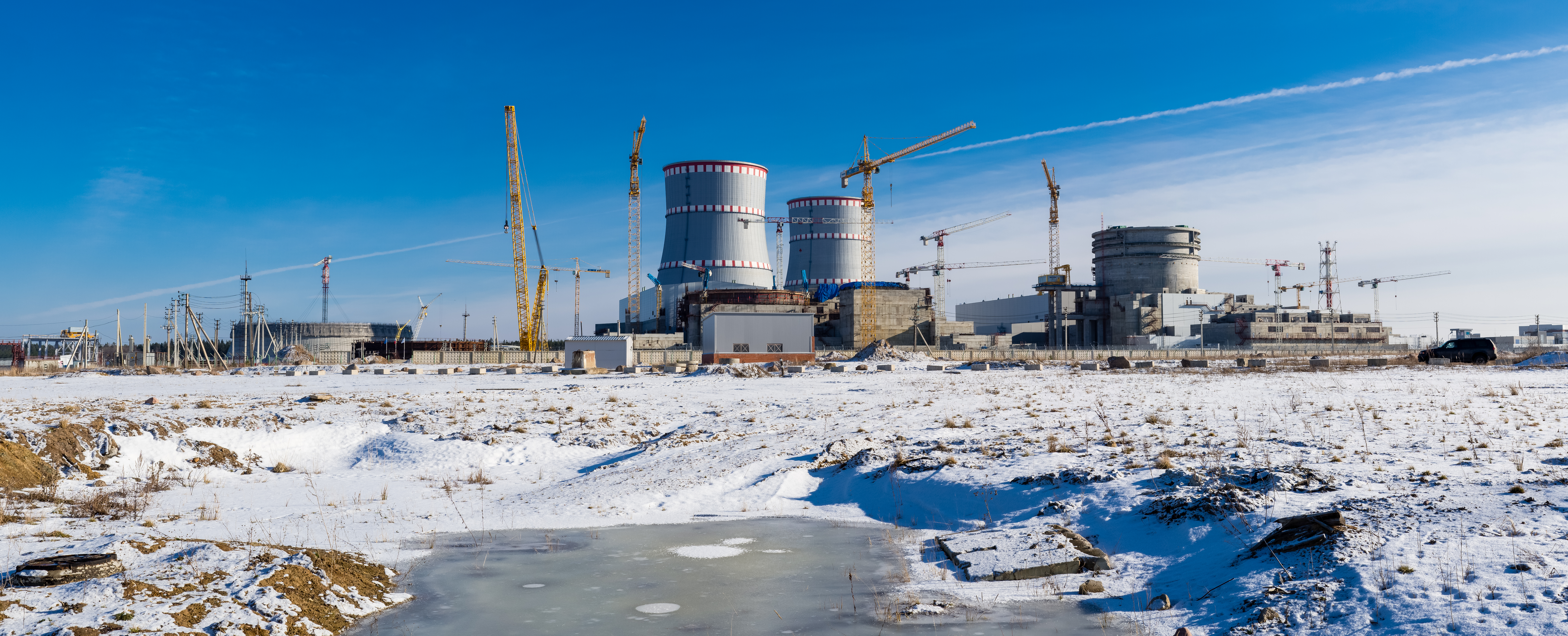
Leningrad II

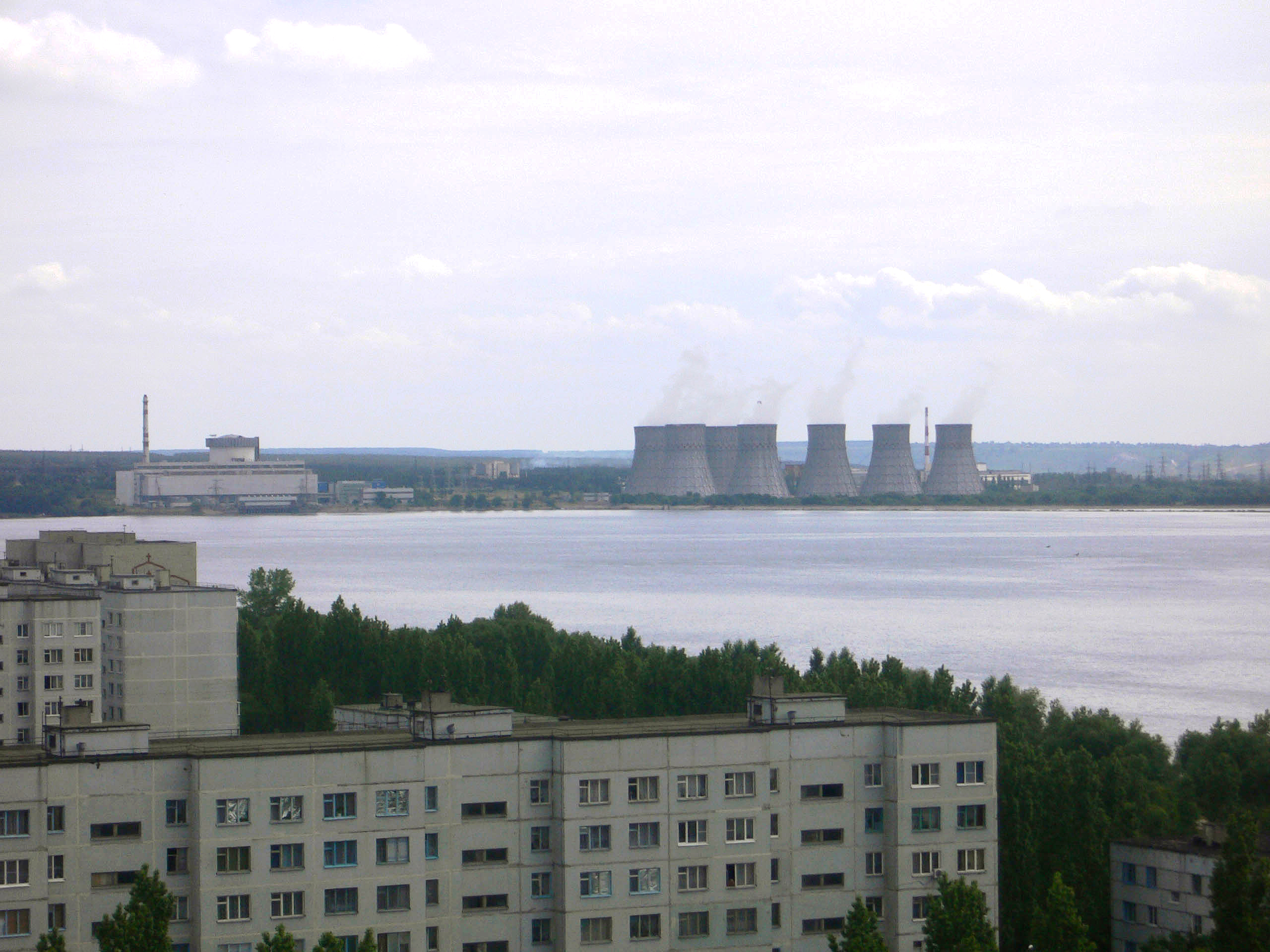
Novovoronezh

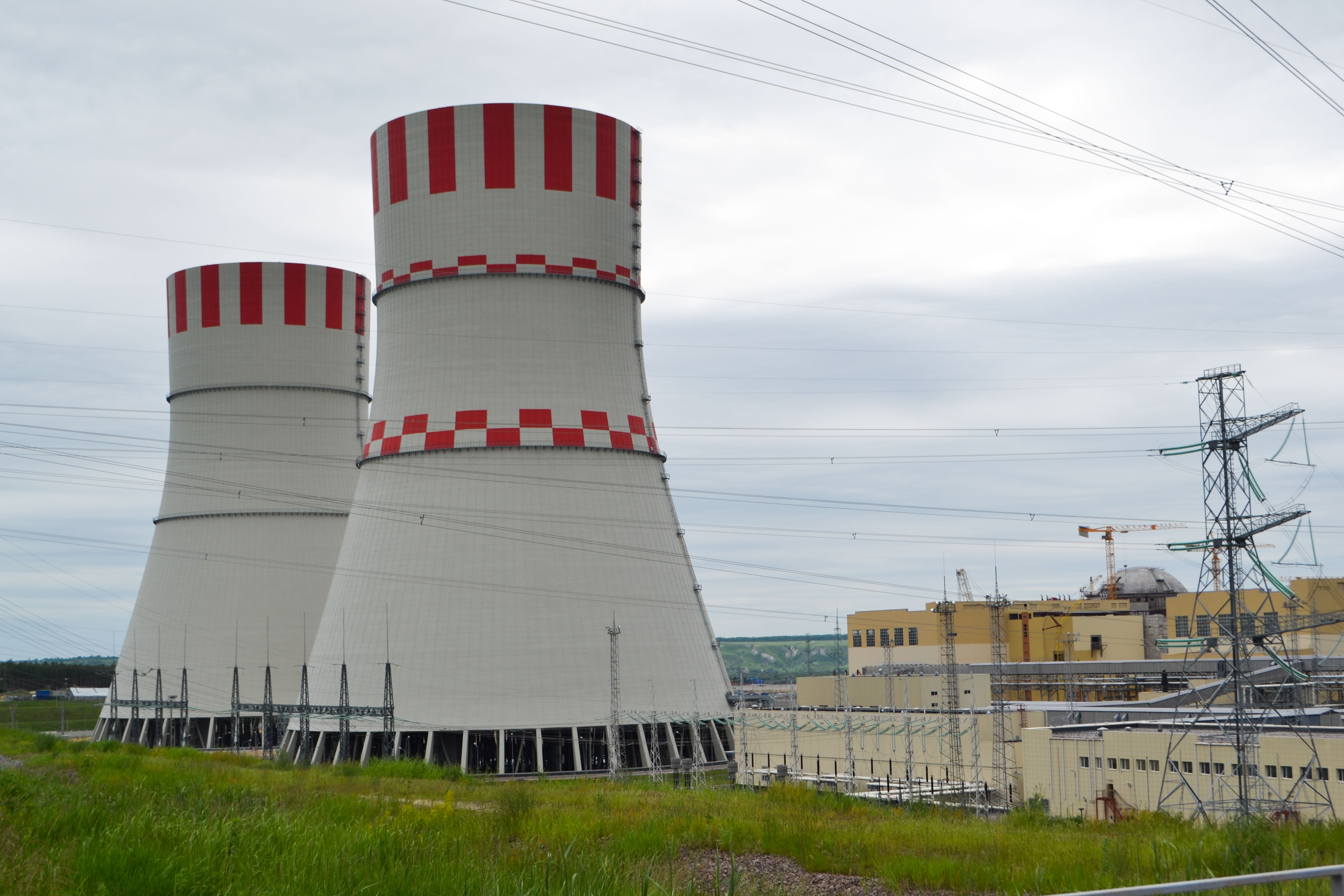
Novovoronezh II

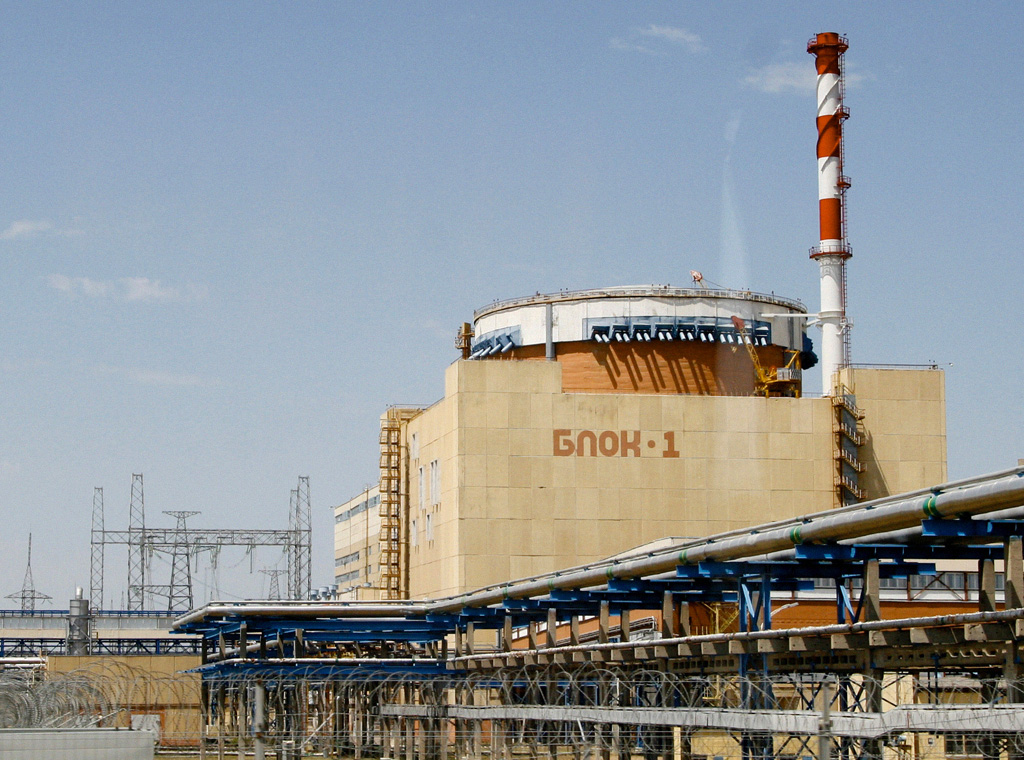
Rostov

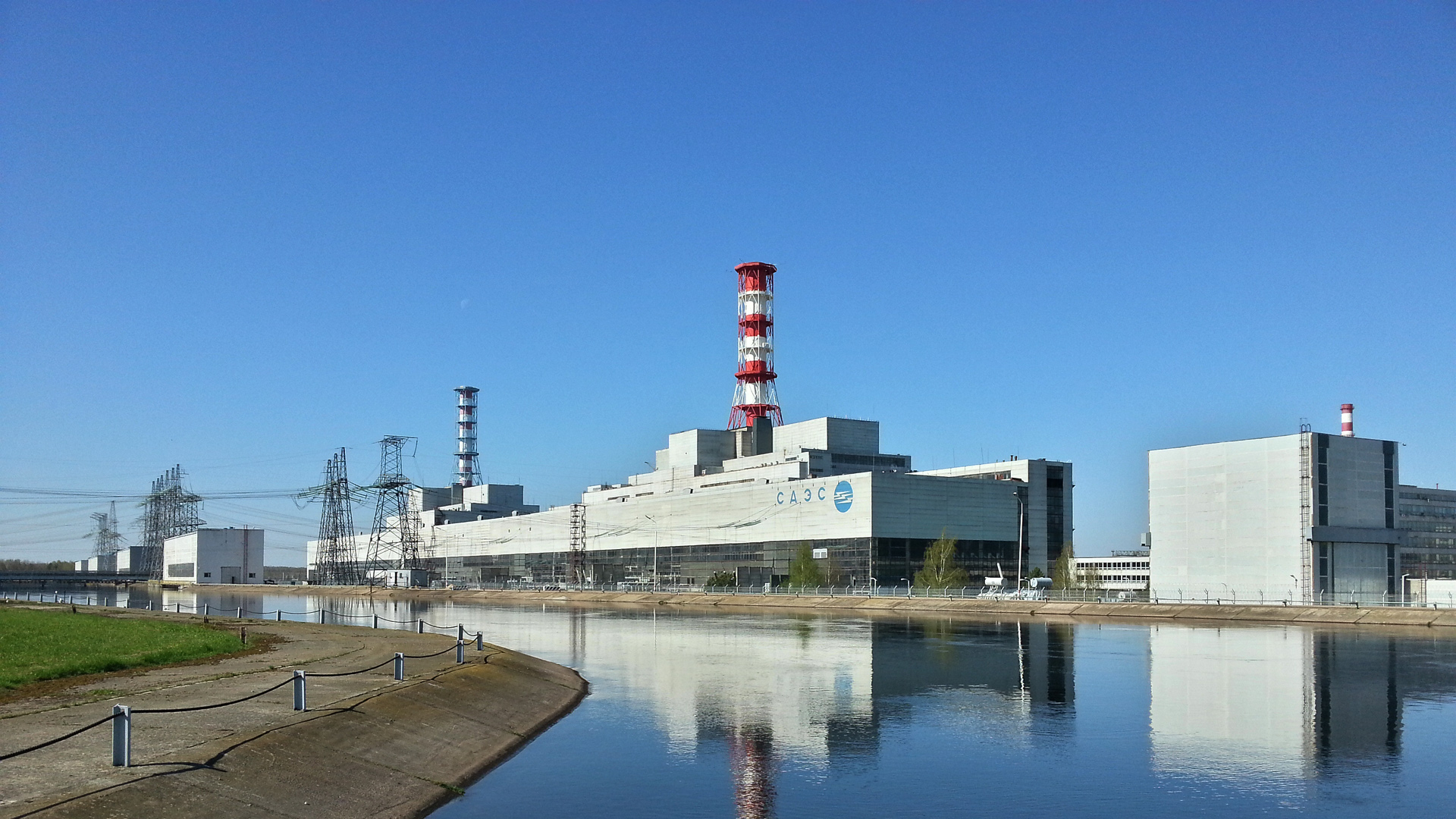
Smolensk

As a result of reforms and reassignments in the period from 2012 to 2014, Rosatom's engineering activities were concentrated within the management company Atomenergoproekt-Atomstroyexport (NIAEP-ASE), based in Nizhny Novgorod. Earlier, Atomstroyexport was engaged in foreign construction, and a number of independent engineering institutes with the name Atomenergoproekt were engaged in the design and construction of facilities in Russia: Moscow, St. Petersburg, and Nizhny Novgorod. Since October 2014 on the basis of NIAEP-ASE, Rosatom forms a unified engineering division, not including design company on nuclear power facilities and technologies Atomproekt. According to Kommersant, such a strategy is aimed at eliminating internal competition, deliberately created earlier. This measure can be effective from the economic point of view in view of a large number of domestic and foreign orders.

==== Floating nuclear power plants ====
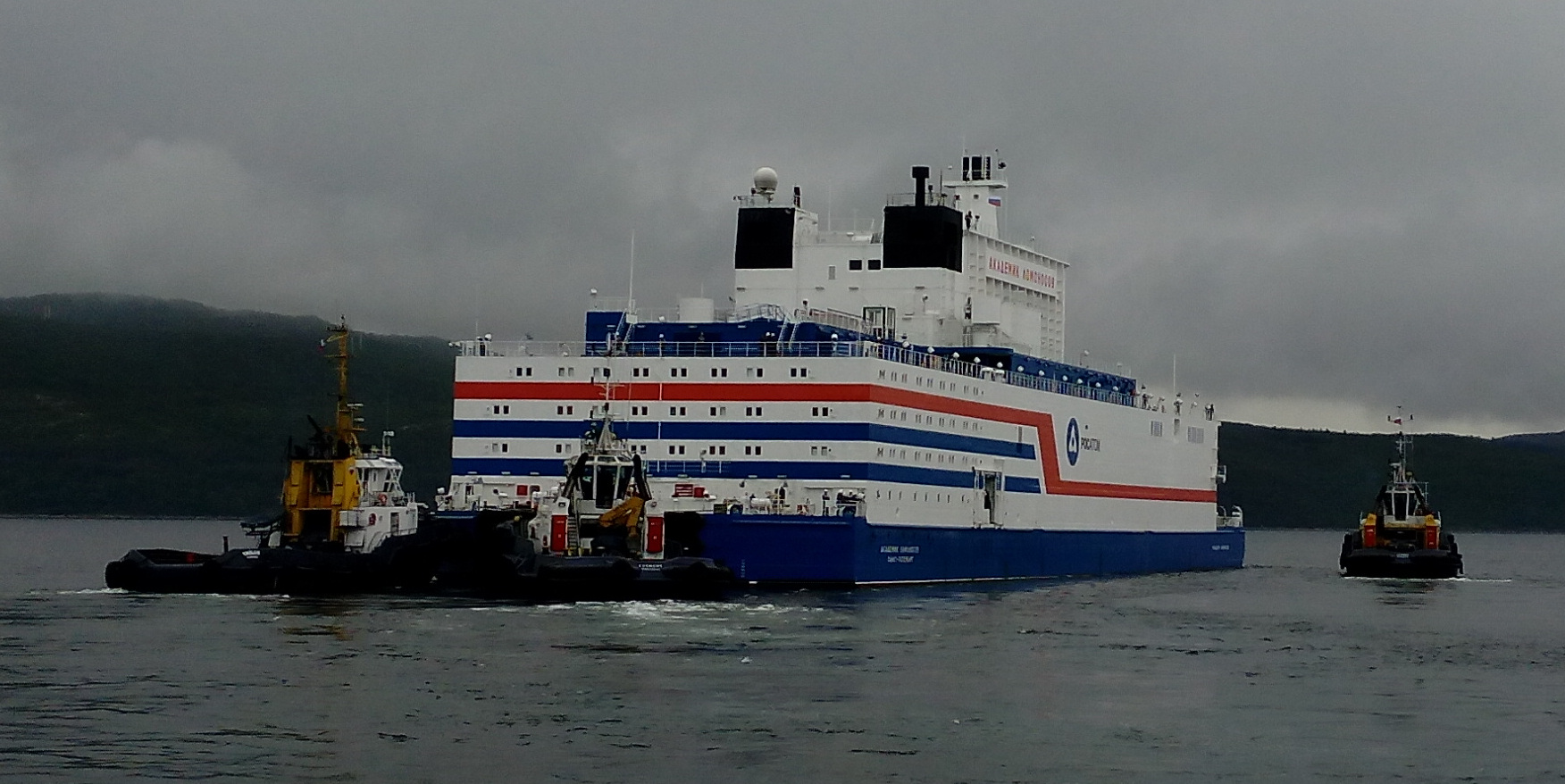
Akademik Lomonosov

==== Under construction ====
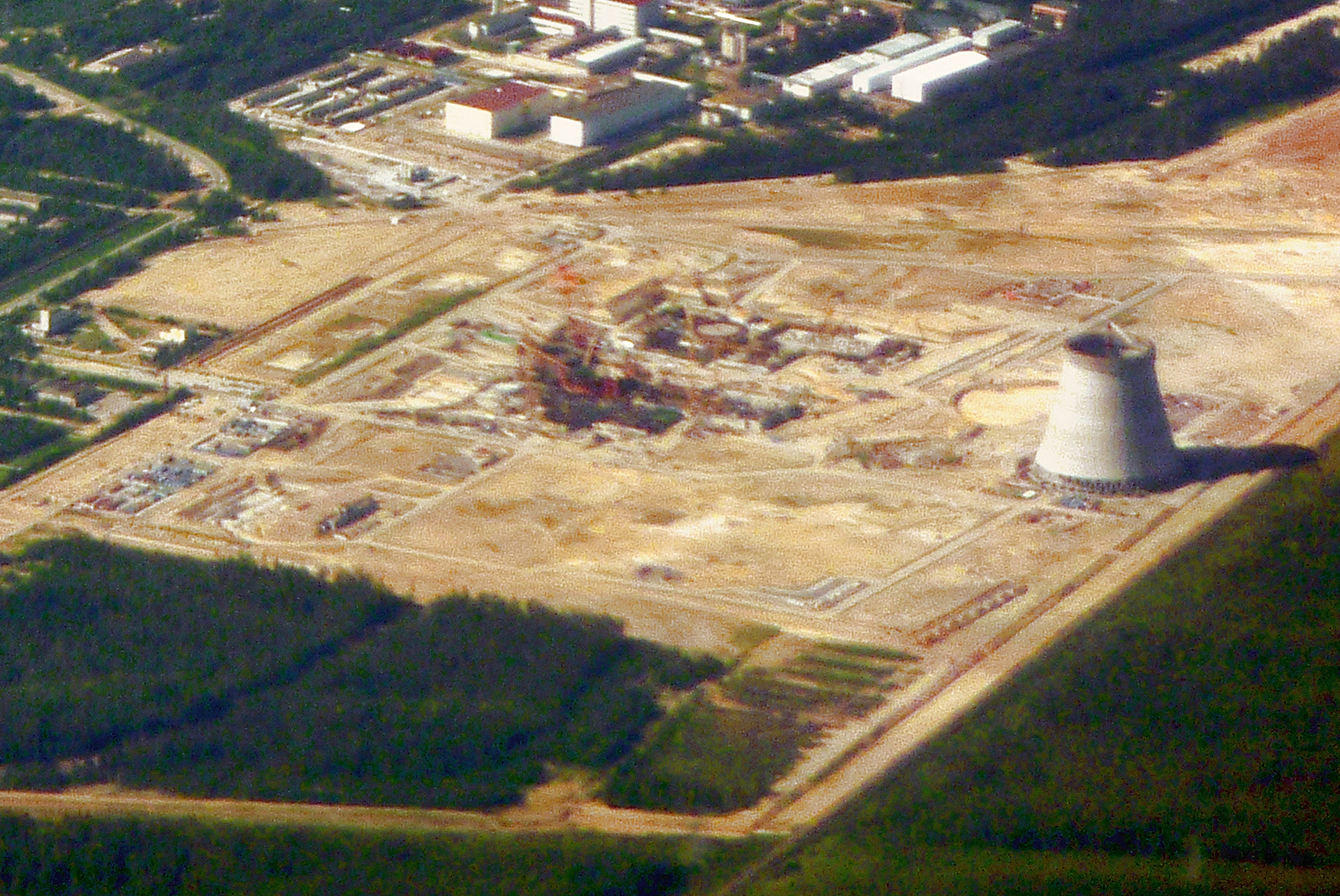
Leningrad Nuclear Power Plant II under construction on 20 July 2010

Rosatom is one of the world leaders in the number of simultaneously constructed power units. As of late 2023, there are 22 units in 7 countries are under construction out of 25 nuclear power plant export projects being built worldwide.

Construction of a nuclear power plant in Kaliningrad started on 25 February 2010, but was suspended for the project to be redesigned.

There are also plans to build two more units at Leningrad NPP, two units at Smolensk NPP, two more units at Novovoronezh NPP and two more units at Kursk NPP. In mid-June 2021, Rosatom announced that two 600 MW VVER reactors will be added to Kola NPP with the first coming online in 2034. In early June 2021, construction of the BREST-OD-300 reactor started. It will be the world's first experimental demonstration power unit featuring a lead-cooled fast neutron reactor.

Plant name	Location	Unit number	Reactor type	Power (MW)	Construction start	Expected completion date
Baltic NNP	Kaliningrad, Kaliningrad Oblast	1	VVER-1200	1,170	2021	Project suspended
Kursk NPP II	Makarovka, Kursk Oblast	1	VVER-1300/510	1,255	2018	2025
Kursk NPP II	Makarovka, Kursk Oblast	2	VVER-1300/510	1,255	2019	2026-7
As of 15 April 2021

==== Past activity abroad ====
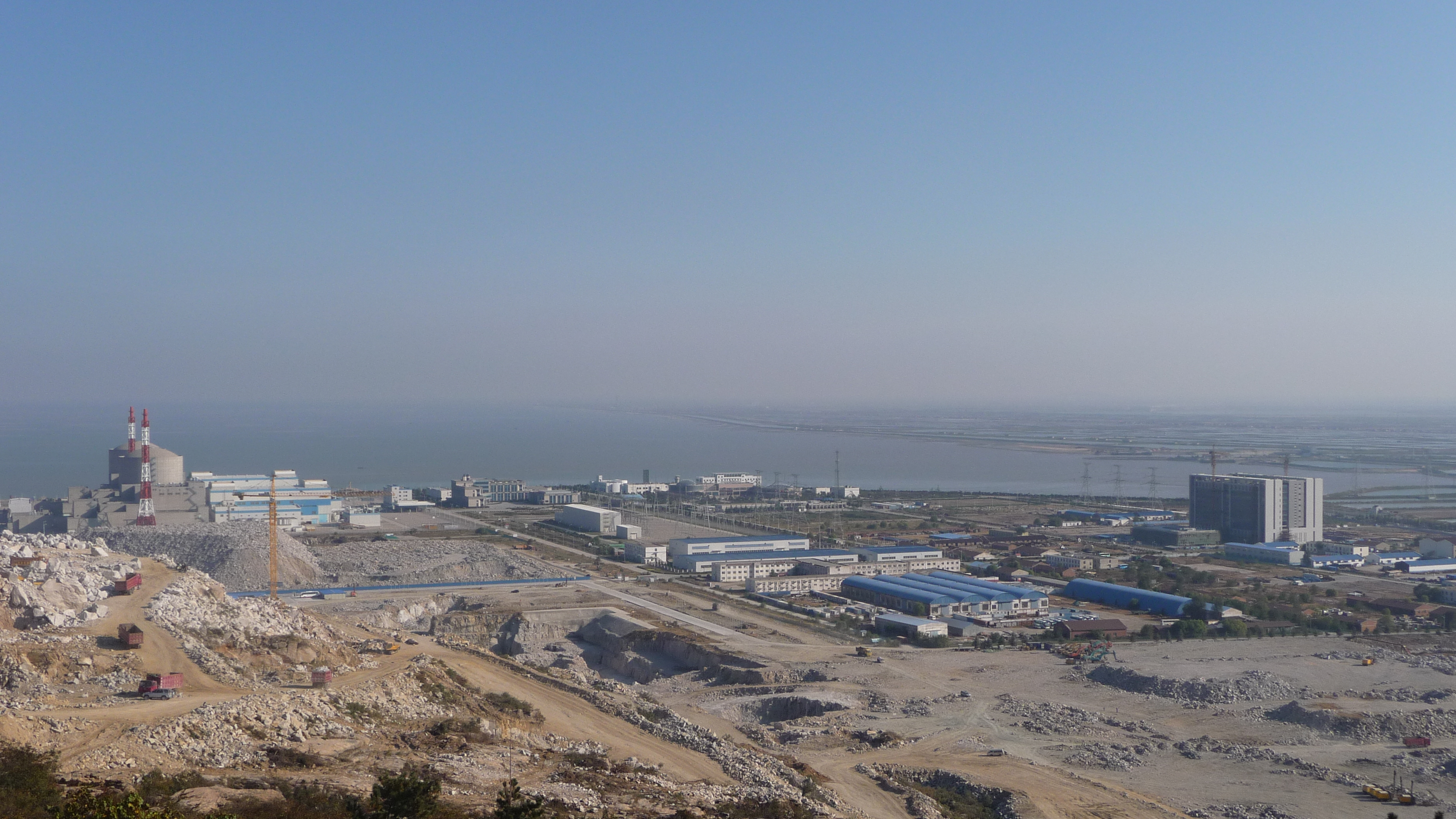
Tianwan Nuclear Power Plant in Lianyungang, China on 8 October 2010.

Rosatom was the world's largest portfolio of foreign NPP construction projects with a market share of 74%. As of the end of 2023, the portfolio of nuclear power plant construction projects abroad by Rosatom included 33 power units in 10 countries, of which 22 power units in 7 countries were under construction.

37% of nuclear reactors under construction worldwide were being built by Rosatom, usually the OKB Gidropress' VVER type. In 2012 Rosatom received $66.5 billion of foreign orders, including $28.9 billion for nuclear plant construction, $24.7 billion for uranium products and $12.9 billion for nuclear fuel exports and associated activities. In 2020, Rosatom received $138.3 billion of foreign orders, including $89.1 billion for nuclear plant construction, $13.3 billion for uranium products and $35.8 billion for nuclear fuel exports and associated activities. Nuclear power plants in China, India, and Iran, were either designed and built by Rosatom or with the corporation's participation.

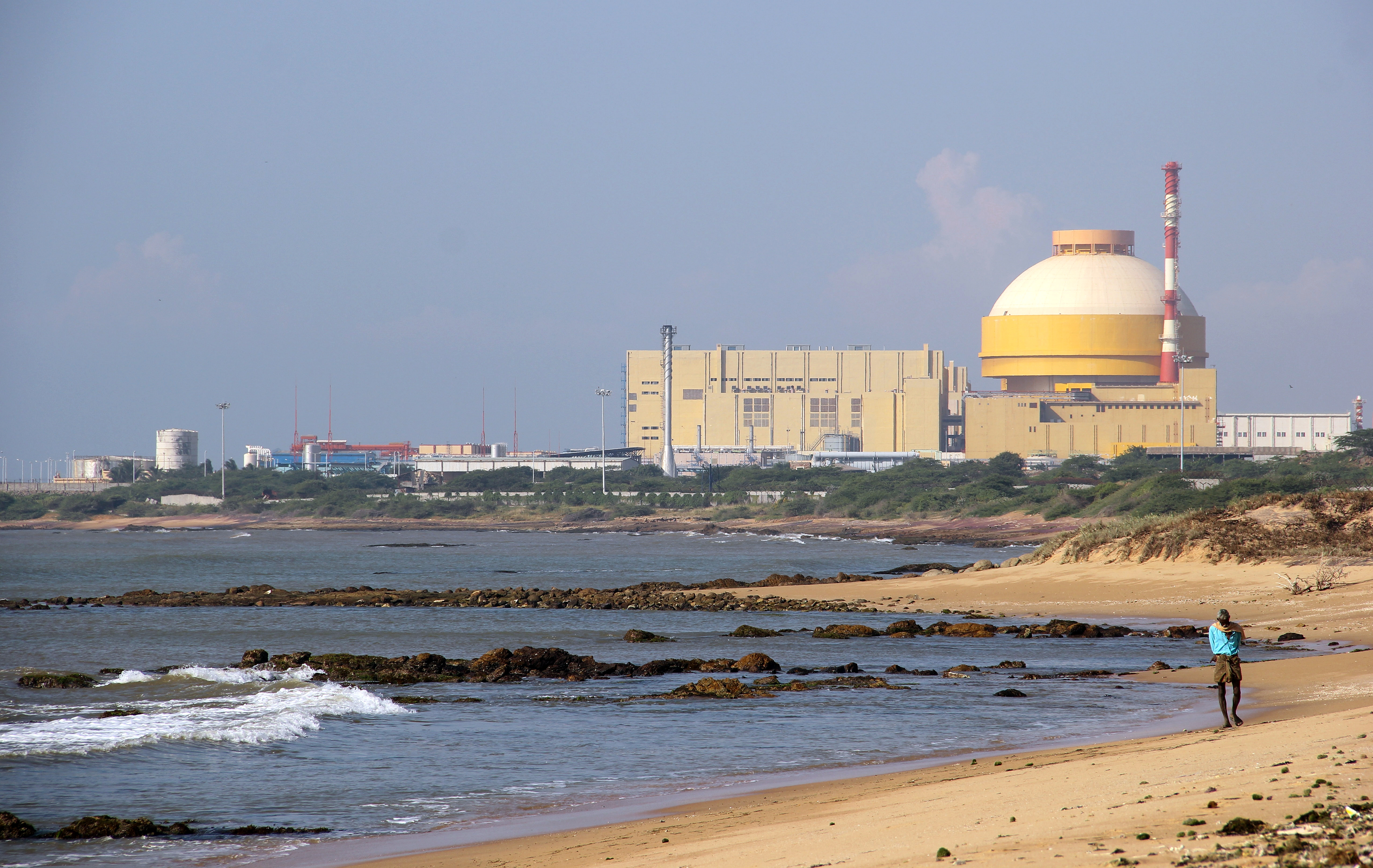
Kudankulam Nuclear Power Plant in Koodankulam, India on 6 January 2014

In December 2013, Rosatom signed a €6.4 billion contract with Fennovoima in Finland of the single-unit Hanhikivi NPP using OKB Gidropress' VVER-1200 pressurized water reactor in the town of Pyhäjoki, with construction planned to start after 2021, but the contract was cancelled in May 2022 by Finland for Russian invasion of Ukraine. In December 2014, Rosatom and the MVM Group of Hungary signed an agreement for the construction of new station units of the Paks NPP with construction planned to start in 2022. Rosatom also started construction of Turkey's Akkuyu NPP on 3 April 2018.

Failed bids includes the cancellation of Units 3 and 4 of Khmelnytskyi NPP in Ukraine.

International NPP projects in the Russian nuclear industry
Plant name	Country	Location	Unit number	Status	Type	Power (MW)	Construction start	Completion date
Akkuyu	Turkey	Akkuyu, Mersin	1	Under construction	VVER-1200/491	1,200	April 2018	2024 (planned)
Akkuyu	Turkey	Akkuyu, Mersin	2	Under construction	VVER-1200/491	1,200	April 2020	2024 (planned)
Akkuyu	Turkey	Akkuyu, Mersin	3	Under construction	VVER-1200/491	1,200	March 2021	2025 (planned)
Akkuyu	Turkey	Akkuyu, Mersin	4	Under construction	VVER-1200/491	1,200	2022	2026 (planned)
Belarusian	Belarus	Astravets, Grodno Region	1	Operational	VVER-1200/491	1,200	6 November 2013	10 June 2021
Belarusian	Belarus	Astravets, Grodno Region	2	Operational	VVER-1200/491	1,200	6 November 2013	13 May 2023
Bushehr	Iran	Bushehr	1	Operational	VVER-1000/446	1,000	1 May 1975; 1995	23 September 2013
Bushehr	Iran	Bushehr	2	Under construction	VVER-1000		September 2019	August 2025
El Dabaa	Egypt	El Dabaa, North Coast	1	Under construction	VVER-1200	1,200	20 July 2022	-
El Dabaa	Egypt	El Dabaa, North Coast	2	Under construction	VVER-1200	1,200	19 November 2022	-
El Dabaa	Egypt	El Dabaa, North Coast	3	Under construction	VVER-1200	1,200	3 May 2023	-
El Dabaa	Egypt	El Dabaa, North Coast	4	planned	VVER-1200	1,200	-	-
Hanhikivi	Finland	Pyhäjoki, Northern Ostrobothnia	1	Cancelled in 2022	VVER-1200	1,200	-	-
Kudankulam	India	Koodankulam, Tamil Nadu	1	Operational	VVER-1000/412	917	31 March 2002	22 October 2013
Kudankulam	India	Koodankulam, Tamil Nadu	2	Operational	VVER-1000/412	917	August 2016	31 March 2017
Kudankulam	India	Koodankulam, Tamil Nadu	3	Under construction	VVER-1000/412	917	29 June 2017	-
Kudankulam	India	Koodankulam, Tamil Nadu	4	Under construction	VVER-1000/412	917	October 2017	-
Kudankulam	India	Koodankulam, Tamil Nadu	5	Under construction	VVER-1000/412	917	30 June 2021	-
Kudankulam	India	Koodankulam, Tamil Nadu	6	Under construction	VVER-1000/412	917	30 June 2021	-
Paks	Hungary	Paks, Tolna County	5	Approved	VVER-1200	1,200	2022	-
Paks	Hungary	Paks, Tolna County	6	Approved	VVER-1200	1,200	2022	-
Rooppur	Bangladesh	Rooppur, Ishwardi	1	Operational	VVER-1200	1,200	November 2017	2023 (planned)
Rooppur	Bangladesh	Rooppur, Ishwardi	2	Operational	VVER-1200	1,200	July 2018	2024 (planned)
Tianwan	China	Lianyungang, Jiangsu	1	Operational	VVER-1000/428	990	20 October 1999	17 May 2007
Tianwan	China	Lianyungang, Jiangsu	2	Operational	VVER-1000/428	990	20 October 2000	16 August 2007
Tianwan	China	Lianyungang, Jiangsu	3	Operational	VVER-1000/428М	1,050	27 December 2012	15 February 2018
Tianwan	China	Lianyungang, Jiangsu	4	Operational	VVER-1000/428М	1,050	27 September 2013	22 December 2018
Tianwan	China	Lianyungang, Jiangsu	7	Approved	VVER-1200	1,150	May 2021	-
Tianwan	China	Lianyungang, Jiangsu	8	Approved	VVER-1200	1,150	2022	-
Xudabao	China	Xingcheng, Huludao, Liaoning	3	Approved	VVER-1200	1,150	2021	-
Xudabao	China	Xingcheng, Huludao, Liaoning	4	Approved	VVER-1200	1,150	2022	-
Mochovce	Slovakia	Mochovce, Nitra Region	1	Operational	VVER 440/213	436	November 1982	29 October 1998
Mochovce	Slovakia	Mochovce, Nitra Region	2	Operational	VVER 440/213	436	November 1982	11 April 2000
Mochovce	Slovakia	Mochovce, Nitra Region	3	Operational	VVER 440/213	436	November 2008	1 February 2023
Mochovce	Slovakia	Mochovce, Nitra Region	4	Under construction	VVER 440/213	436	November 2008	2025 (planned)

==== Small reactors and floating nuclear plants ====
Rosatom has practical experience operating small reactors in the Far North, including the four EGP-6 reactor-equipped power units of Bilibino NPP. In 2019, the floating nuclear power plant Akademik Lomonosov, equipped with two KLT-40 reactors, was connected to the grid in the Russian town of Pevek. Akademic Lomonosov has an electric power capacity of 70 MW and a thermal power capacity of 50 Gcal/h. Rosatom's new floating nuclear power plant projects will be equipped with RITM-200 reactors, which are used in Project 22220 icebreakers. Rosatom also has ground-based small nuclear power plant projects equipped with RITM-200 reactors. In November 2020, Rosatom announced plans to place a land-based RITM-200 SMR in the isolated town of Ust-Kuyga, Yakutia. In early August 2021, the Russian nuclear regulator granted a license to Rusatom Overseas JSC, allowing the company to build nuclear installations at nuclear power plants within the framework of the project in Yakutia.

Rosatom offers land, water, and submarine versions of the small modular reactor “Shelf” for consumers in the ≤ 10 MW power range. The company also developed the SVBR-100 lead-bismuth fast reactor for consumers in the ≤ 100 MW power range, though the latter project is currently frozen. As of 2023, the State Corporation Rosatom approved the technical design of the reactor unit and began manufacturing equipment for a land-based small nuclear power plant with a RITM-200N reactor, planned for construction in Yakutia.

==== Research reactors ====
According to the Research Reactor Database (RRDB), maintained by the IAEA, Russia has 54 research reactors, which are largely based at Rosatom enterprises and institutes. Most of Russia's research reactors were built in the USSR, in the early stages of the development of the nuclear energy sector. Today, Rosatom's largest research reactor project is the Multipurpose Fast Neutron Research Reactor (MBIR), which is currently under construction. Based in Dimitrovgrad, Ulyanovsk oblast, the reactor will be the world leader among high-flux research facilities. Its unique physical characteristics are best suited for material science experiments, such as testing innovative fuel and new coolants.

Rosatom provides support to its foreign partners in the creation of nuclear science and technology centres, including scientific laboratories and research reactors. The company is currently building the first centre of such type in Bolivia, which will be commissioned in 2024. Another contract to build similar facilities in Zambia was signed in 2018.

==== Two-component structure of nuclear power ====
In 2018, Rosatom adopted a long-term strategy through year 2010, for the development of nuclear energy in accordance with the following goals:

- To form the basis for the generation of carbon-free energy and be competitive in other forms of generation of electric and thermal energy;
- To promote the highest possible high-tech export of nuclear power plants, research reactors, nuclear fuel, equipment, and services in the nuclear technology market;
- To ensure the conservation of organic uranium reserves for non-energy use;
- To solve environmental problems and fulfill Russia's international obligations of carbon dioxide emissions reduction.

In pursuit of achieving these goals, Rosatom is transitioning to a two-component nuclear power structure that operates in a closed-loop heavy metal (uranium, plutonium, and minor actinides) fuel cycle that simultaneously involves thermal and fast reactors. VVER reactors, with their improved adjustments, were selected as thermal reactors and BN (sodium-cooled) and BREST/BR (lead-cooled) reactors were selected as fast reactors. In such a system, spent nuclear fuel is considered a valuable raw material instead of nuclear waste, as it could be further used for fresh fuel fabrication. Rosatom is currently at the first stage of transitioning to a two-component structure.

=== Icebreaker fleet ===
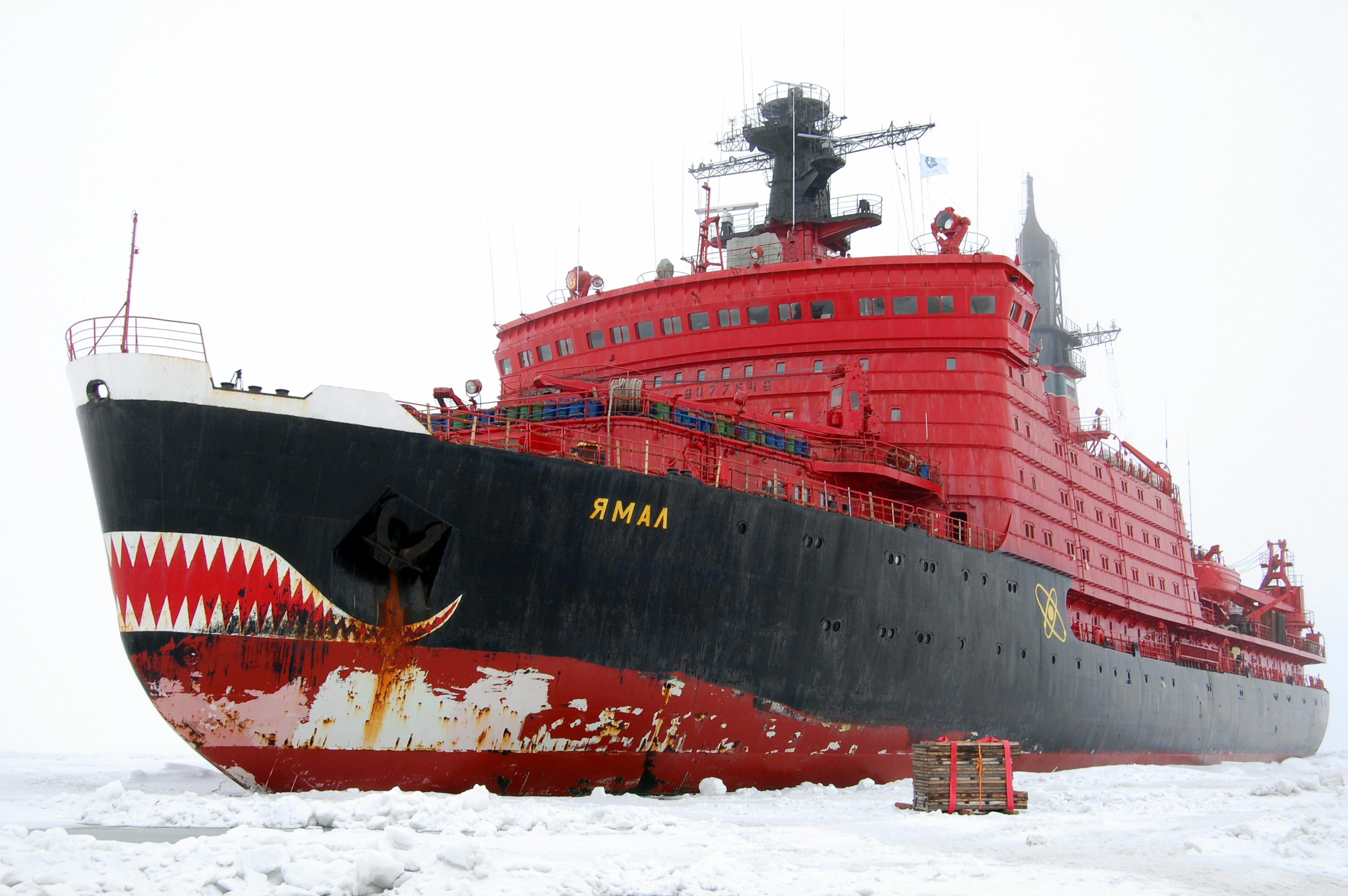
Arktika-class icebreaker Yamal

Since 2008, the structure of Rosatom includes the Russian nuclear icebreaker fleet, which is the largest in the world with five nuclear-powered icebreakers, a container ship, and four service vessels. Its tasks include navigation on the routes of the Northern Sea Route and rescue operations in ice. Operation and maintenance of the fleet is carried out by FSUE Atomflot, also known as Rosatomflot, a company based in Murmansk.

== Corporate governance ==
=== Supervisory Board ===
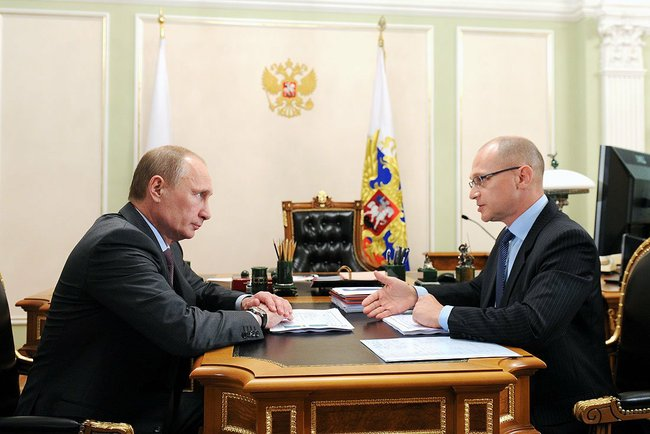
Russian President Vladimir Putin with the head of Rosatom, Sergey Kiriyenko, in January 2014

The highest executive body of Rosatom is the supervisory board, consisting of nine people, including the chairman. The board is headed since 2005 by chairman Sergey Kiriyenko. Other Board members are:

- Igor Borovkov - the head of the apparatus of the Military-Industrial Commission
- Larisa Brychyova- Assistant to the President of Russia
- Alexey Likhachev - General Director of Rosatom
- Andrei Klepach - Deputy Minister for Economic Development
- Sergey Korolev - Director for Economic Security of the Federal Security Service
- Alexander Novak - Minister of Energy of Russia
- Yuriy P. Trutnev - representative of the President of Russia in the Far-Eastern Federal District
- Yuriy V. Ushakov - Assistant to the President of Russia

=== Management Board ===
Strategies, policies and objectives of Rosatom are established by its management board, consisting of fourteen people, including the General Director. The board is headed since 2016 by General Director Alexey Likhachev.

- Alexey Likhachev - General Director of Rosatom
- Ivan Kamenskikh - First Deputy Director General for Nuclear Weapons
- Kirill Komarov - First Deputy Director General for Corporate Development and International Business
- Alexander Lokshin - First Deputy Director General for Operations Management
- Nikolay Solomon - First Deputy Director General for Corporate Functions and CFO
- Konstantin Denisov - Deputy Director General for Security
- Sergey Novikov - State Secretary – Deputy Director General for Execution of State Powers and Budgeting
- Nikolay Spassky - Deputy Director General for International Relations
- Oleg Kryukov - Director for Public Policy on Radioactive Waste, Spent Nuclear Fuel and Nuclear Decommissioning
- Andrey Nikipelov - CEO of Atomenergomash
- Sergey Obozov - Director for Rosatom Production System, Member of Rosenergoatom's Board of Directors
- Yuri Olenin - Deputy Director General for Innovation Management
- Andrei Petrov - Director General of Rosenergoatom
- Yuri Yakovlev - Deputy Director General for the State Safety Policy in the Defense Uses of Atomic Energy

=== General Director ===
The sole executive body of Rosatom is the General Director, who manages the day-to-day operations. Sergey Kiriyenko, who headed the Russian nuclear industry in 2005, became general director of Rosatom since its creation until he got replaced on 5 October 2016, by Alexey Likhachev, former Deputy Minister for Economic Development.

- Sergey Kiriyenko (1 December 2007 – 5 October 2016)
- Alexey Likhachev (5 October 2016–present)

=== Public Council ===
The Public Council of Rosatom works with civic organizations to utilize nuclear power, protect the environment, and ensure nuclear and radiation safety. Objectives of the council are:

- Raise public awareness of Rosatom's activities
- Involve civic organizations in making policies on nuclear power
- Negotiate nuclear issues with the general public
- Communicate efficiently with stakeholders

Council members are:

- Alexey Likhachev - General Director of Rosatom, Chairman of the Public Council
- Alexander Lokshin - First Deputy Director General for Operations Management
- Sergey Baranovsky - President of the Russian Green Cross, Chairman of the Russian Ecological Congress, Deputy Chairman of the Public Council
- Rudolf Aleksakhin - Leading Ecologist of ROSATOM's Proriv (Breakthrough) Project
- Rafael Arutyunyan - First Deputy Director of the Institute for Safe Development of Nuclear Energy of Russian Academy of Sciences
- Valery Bochkarev - Head of Radiation Safety Division, Federal Centre for Nuclear and Radiation Safety
- Natalia Davydova - Director of "Environmental Projects Consulting Institute"
- Mark Glinsky - First Deputy CEO of the Gidrospetsgeologia Geological Survey
- Vladimir Grachev - Advisor to the ROSATOM CEO, Chairman of the Public Council with the Federal Nuclear, Industrial, and Environmental Regulatory Authority of Russia (Rostekhnadzor)
- Alexander Harichev - Head of Local Communities Relations Unit, Advisor to the ROSATOM CEO (Secretary of the Public Council)
- Viktor Ivanov - Deputy Director of the Russian Academy of Medicine Research Centre for Medical Radiology, Chairman of the Russian Federation Commission on Radiation Protection
- Valery Menschikov - Member of the council with the Russian Environmental Policy Centre
- Oleg Muratov - Executive Secretary of North-West Section of Russian Nuclear Society, Member of the Academy of Ecology, Safety of Human and Nature
- Alexander Nikitin (Left in 2022) - Chairman of the Bellona Foundation (Saint Petersburg office)
- Vladimir Ognev - Chairman of the Interregional Public Movement of Nuclear Industry and Power Veterans
- Natalia Shandala - Deputy General Director of Burnazyan Federal Medical and Biophysical Centre
- Yuriy Tebin - Vice-president of Chamber for Trade and Commerce of Moscow Oblast
- Albert Vasiliev - Chief Scientific Officer at the Dollezhal Research and Design Institute for Power Engineering
- Valeriy Vassilyev - Мember of the Citizens’ Assembly of Krasnodarsk Area, Public Council of the Russian Federation
- Andrey Vazhenin - Chief Doctor of Chelyabinsk Regional Clinical Oncologic Treatment Center, Сorresponding member of Russian Academy of Medical Science
- Yan Vlasov - Chairman of the Public Council for Protection of Patients’ Rights at Roszdravandzor, Co-chairman of All-Russia Union of Patients’ Public Organizations
- Sergey Zhavoronkin - Secretary of the Public Council for Nuclear Safety in Murmansk Oblast
- Elena Yakovleva - Chief Editor of the International Magazine Safety of Nuclear Technologies and Environment, Head of the Internet-project of Russian Nuclear Society
- Sergey Yudintsev - Corresponding Member of the Russian Academy of Sciences, Head of the Laboratory of Radiogeology and Radiogeoecology, Institute of Geology of Ore Deposits, Petrography, Mineralogy, and Geochemistry, Russian Academy of Sciences

== See also ==
- Energy policy of Russia
  - Nuclear power in Russia
- Atomenergoprom, civil nuclear activities including Tekhsnabexport (fuel/uranium exporter), Rosenergoatom
- Ministry of Medium Machine Building of the USSR, Soviet ministry in charge of civil nuclear activities in the USSR
- Institute for Theoretical and Experimental Physics
- Institute for High Energy Physics
- List of companies of Russia
- Uranium One controversy
- Companies similar to Rosatom
  - Korea Hydro & Nuclear Power
  - Mitsubishi Heavy Industries
    - Mitsubishi FBR Systems
  - Orano
  - Toshiba
  - Westinghouse Electric Company
