= Angarsk Electrochemical Combine =

Company based in Angarsk, Russia

- Company type: Joint-stock company
- Founded: 1954
- Headquarters: Angarsk, Russia
- Products: Uranium hexafluoride; Triflic acid; radiation detectors; Niobium oxide; Tantalum oxide
- Number of employees: 920 (2020)
- Parent: TVEL (Rosatom group)
- Website: www.aecc.ru

Angarsk Electrochemical Combine (Russian: Ангарский электролизный химический комбинат) is a company based in Angarsk, Russia. It is a subsidiary of TVEL (Rosatom group).

The Angarsk Electrochemical Combine manufactures uranium hexafluoride, triflic acid, niobium oxide, tantalum oxide, radiation detectors, automated personnel monitoring systems for use in nuclear power plants, and a variety of chemicals.

== Directors ==
CEO - Glushenkov Vyacheslav Valerievich.
