= Novosibirsk-Vostochny railway station =

Railway station in Novosibirsk

Novosibirsk-Vostochny

General information
- Location: Russia, Novosibirsk
- Coordinates: 55.0675°N 82.9747°E
- Owner: Russian Railways

History
- Opened: 1927
- Former names: Eltsovka
Location

Novosibirsk-Vostochny (Russian: Новосибирск-Восточный) is a passenger and freight railway station along the Trans-Siberian Railway. It is located in Dzerzhinsky District of Novosibirsk, Russia.

== History ==
The station was opened in 1927. Its initial name was "Eltsovka". The necessitating the construction of the station was owing to the building of new railway to Kuznetsk Basin (line Novosibirsk - Toguchin - Leninsk-Kuznetsky), and the station became the main base of the trust "Sibzheldorstroy" (eventually renamed "Zapsibtransstroy") which carried out many railway construction projects in Western Siberia.

In 1960, the station acquired its present name.

The station also serves many industrial units such as Novosibirsk Aircraft Production Association Plant, Novosibirsk Chemical Concentrates Plant, CHP-4, and others.

In 2015, the station was reopened after reconstruction.
