= Chepetskiy Mechanical plant =

Coordinates: 58.156°N 52.647°E

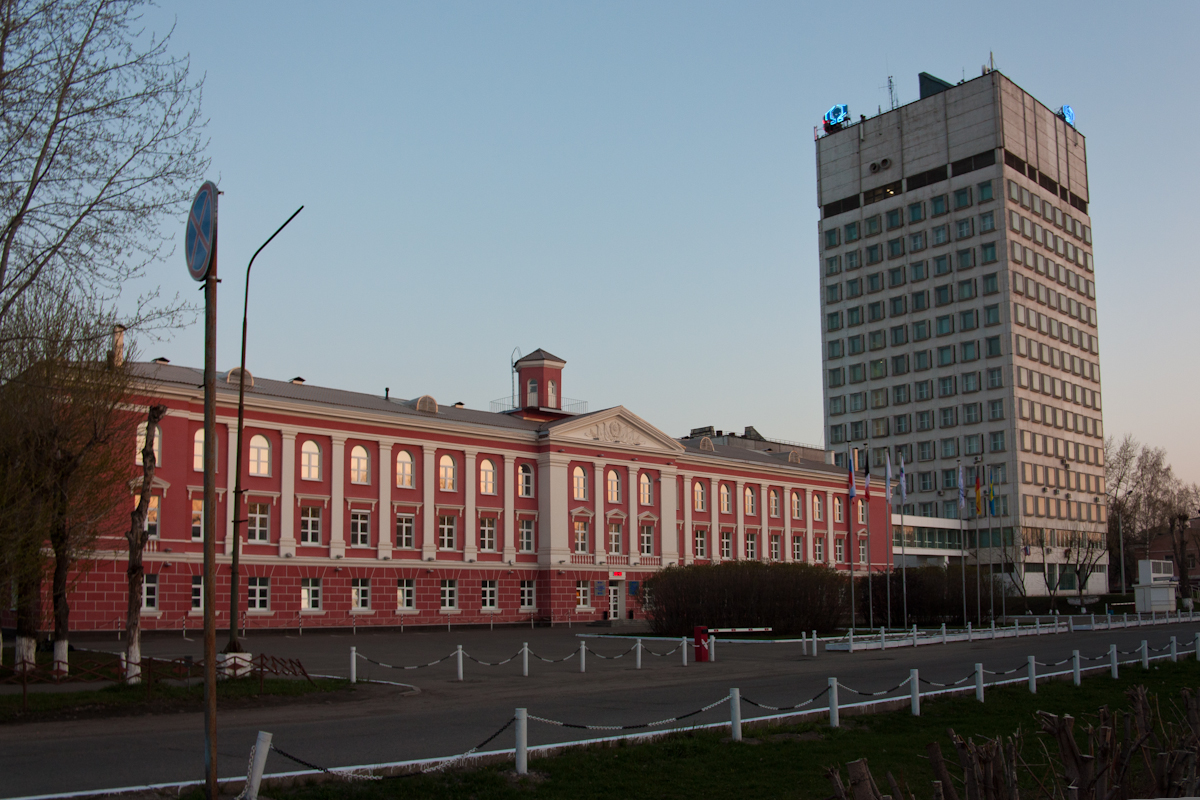
Chepetskiy Mechanical Plant

Chepetskiy Mechanical Plant (Russian: Чепецкий механический завод) is a company based in Glazov, Russia, and was established in 1946. It is part of TVEL, a Rosatom subsidiary.

The Chepetskiy Mechanical Plant Association is a leading producer of metallic calcium, zirconium, and depleted uranium, and equipment and materials for nuclear energy.
