= Niobium alloy =

Alloy

A niobium alloy is one in which the most common element is niobium.

== Alloys used for the production of other alloys ==
The most common commercial niobium alloys are ferroniobium and nickel-niobium, produced by thermite reduction of appropriate mixtures of the oxides; these are not usable as engineering materials, but are used as convenient sources of niobium for specialist steels and nickel-based superalloys. Going via an iron-niobium or nickel-niobium alloy avoids problems associated with the high melting point of niobium.

== Superconducting alloys ==
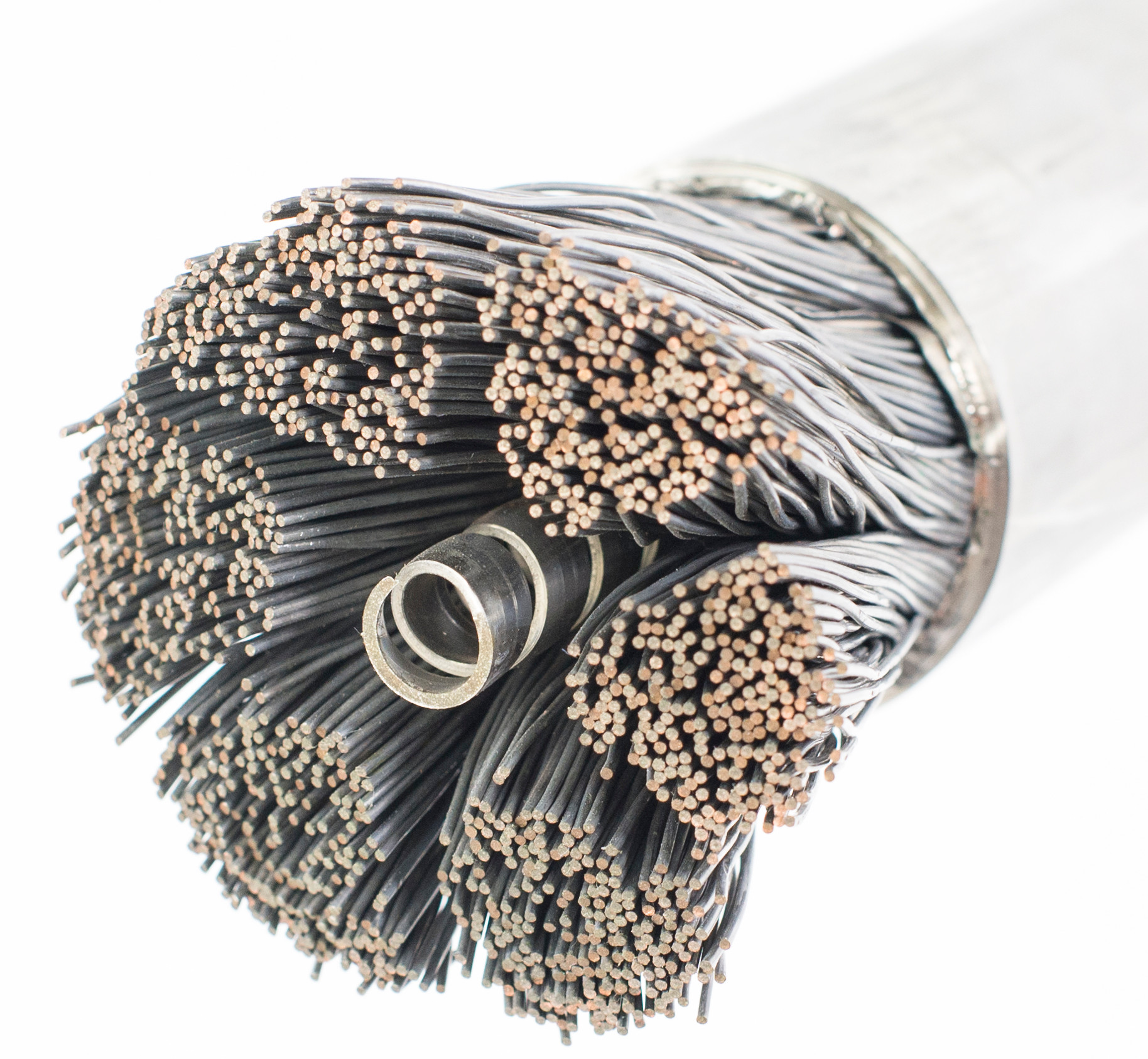
Niobium–tin superconducting wire from the ITER fusion reactor, which is currently under construction.

Niobium-tin and Niobium-titanium are essential alloys for the industrial use of superconductors, since they remain superconducting in high magnetic fields (30 T for Nb_{3}Sn, 15 T for NbTi); there are 1200 tons of NbTi in the magnets of the Large Hadron Collider, whilst Nb_{3}Sn is used in the windings of almost all hospital MRI machines.

=== Aerospace rivets ===
Niobium-titanium alloy, of the same composition as the superconducting one, is used for rivets in the aerospace industry; it is easier to form than CP titanium, and stronger at elevated (> 300 °C) temperatures.

== Refractory alloys ==
Niobium-1% zirconium is used in rocketry and in the nuclear industry. It is regarded as a low-strength alloy.

C-103, which is 89% Nb, 10% Hf and 1% Ti, is used for the rocket nozzle of the Apollo service module and the Merlin vacuum engines; it is regarded as a medium-strength alloy. It is typically produced using gas atomization or plasma atomization techniques. It is particularly used in additive manufacturing (3D printing) and powder metallurgy processes. Due to its corrosion resistance and high thermal efficiency, C103 helps reduce material waste and environmental pollution.

High-strength alloys include C-129Y (10% tungsten, 10% hafnium, 0.1% yttrium, balance niobium), Cb-752 (10% tungsten, 2.5% zirconium), and the even higher strength C-3009 (61% niobium, 30% hafnium, 9% tungsten); these can be used at temperatures up to 1650 °C with acceptable strength, though are expensive and hard to form.

Nb-Hf-Ti is an alloy powder consisting of niobium (Nb), hafnium (Hf), and a small amount of titanium (Ti) provides high strength, ductility, high-temperature stability, and remarkable corrosion resistance. It is used in manufacturing biocompatible implants and devices such as orthopedic implants and dental prosthetics.

Niobium alloys in general are inconvenient to weld: both sides of the weld must be protected with a stream of inert gas, because hot niobium will react with oxygen and nitrogen in the air. It is also necessary to take care (e.g. hard chrome-plating of all copper tooling) to avoid copper contamination.

=== High Temperature Performance ===
While Nb alloys exhibit high strength at high temperatures, Nb has high affinity to C, N, and O (known as interstitial impurities). Variation in interstitial impurity content can result in subsequent variation in strength and performance. To mitigate this effect, thermal barrier coating are often required for Nb-alloys at high temperatures. Additionally, elements that have a higher interstitial affinity, such as Zr, can be added to mitigate negative effects and form precipitates.

High temperature deformation of Nb alloys is dominated by creep deformation. Nb-based alloys are a class 1 solid solution material. Class 1 creep is denoted by a slow initial strain rate and reduced strain in the primary regime. This behavior is due to solute drag creep being the dominant strengthening mechanism in most Nb alloys.

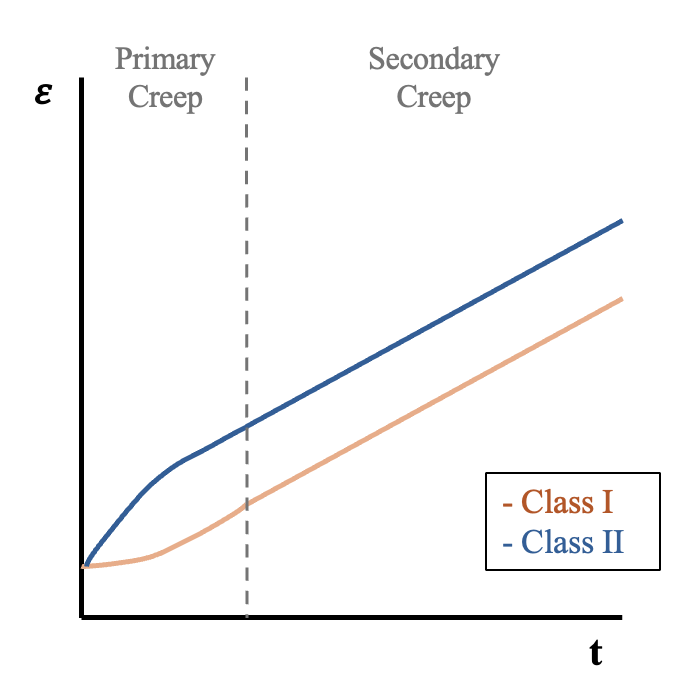
Generalized creep behavior under constant stress of class I and II materials

The table below shows deformation properties of various high temperature Nb alloys in various temperature regimes. While data for deformation properties of Cb-752 and Nb-1Zr are limited, the creep properties of C103 are better studied.

Alloy	Composition (wt%)	Strengthening Mechanism	Low Temperature Regime	Mid-Temperature Regime	High Temperature Regime
C103	Nb-10Hf-1Ti	Solid solution (SS) Strengthened	< 500°C Strength increases as Ti acts as a SS strengthener	500 – 900 °C Strength is stabilized due to strain hardening balances recovery processes	> 900 °C Long range diffusion decreases strength and increases ductility
Cb7525	Nb-10W-10Hf-0.1Y	SS Strengthened	< 400 °C Decrease in strength due to rapid recovery	400 – 800 °C Strength is stabilized due to strain hardening balancing recovery, and the formation of ZrO2 precipitates.	> 800 °C Rapid strength decrease due to dissolution of ZrO2 precipitates
Nb-1Zr	Nb-1Zr	Precipitate strengthened	< 400 °C Decrease in strength due to rapid recovery	400 – 800 °C Strength is stabilized due to formation of ZrO2. Ductility is reduced due to precipitate formation at grain boundaries	> 1000 °C Strength decreases due to diffusion aiding dislocation motion and ZrO2 precipitates likely dissolving

The creep properties of C103 are well studied. This alloy is primarily solid solution (SS) strengthened alloy, with no intentional second phases. Strengthening is believed to primarily be contributed by the addition of 10 wt% Hf, due to the +18.58% atomic volume mismatch with Nb. Ti is also alloyed into C103 at 3 wt%, but the atomic volume mismatch is too small to contribute to solute drag creep, at only -3% volume difference between Nb. While Ti does not contribute to the high temperature strength of C103, it does act as a low temperature (< 500 °C) SS strengthener. The small addition of Zr (0.48 atm%), makes it unlikely to contribute to solute drag creep, despite having a high atomic volume mismatch with Nb at +27.11%. Based on this information, it can be assumed that the activation energy of diffusion for creep is close to that for the activation energy for diffusion of Hf within Nb. While there is no explicit data for the activation energy, it is estimated to be within 2% of the activation energy for diffusion of Ti (~368 kJ/mol) and Zr (364 kJ/mol) within Nb.
