= Ministry of Atomic Energy =

Government ministry of the Soviet Union

The Ministry of Atomic Energy (Minatom; Russian: Министерство атомной энергетики СССР) was a government ministry in the Soviet Union from 1986 to 1989.

Created soon after the Chernobyl disaster on 21 July 1986, the ministry assumed responsibility for all nuclear energy in the USSR while the control of individual atomic stations remained with the State Committee for the Utilization of Atomic Energy (GKAE).

On 27 June 1989, the Ministry of Atomic Energy was merged with the Ministry of Medium Machine Building to create the Ministry of Atomic Energy and Industry of the USSR (Russian: Министерство атомной энергетики и промышленности СССР), which existed until 26 November 1991. Its successor, the Ministry of Atomic Energy of the Russian Federation (Министерство Российской Федерации по атомной энергии), was established by a presidential decree on 29 January 1992.

== List of ministers ==
- Nikolai Lukonin (9 September 1986 - 17 July 1989)
- Vitaliy Konovalov (17 July 1989 - 24 August 1991, Minister of Atomic Energy and Industry)
