= TVEL =

Nuclear fuel company based in Russia

TVEL Fuel Company
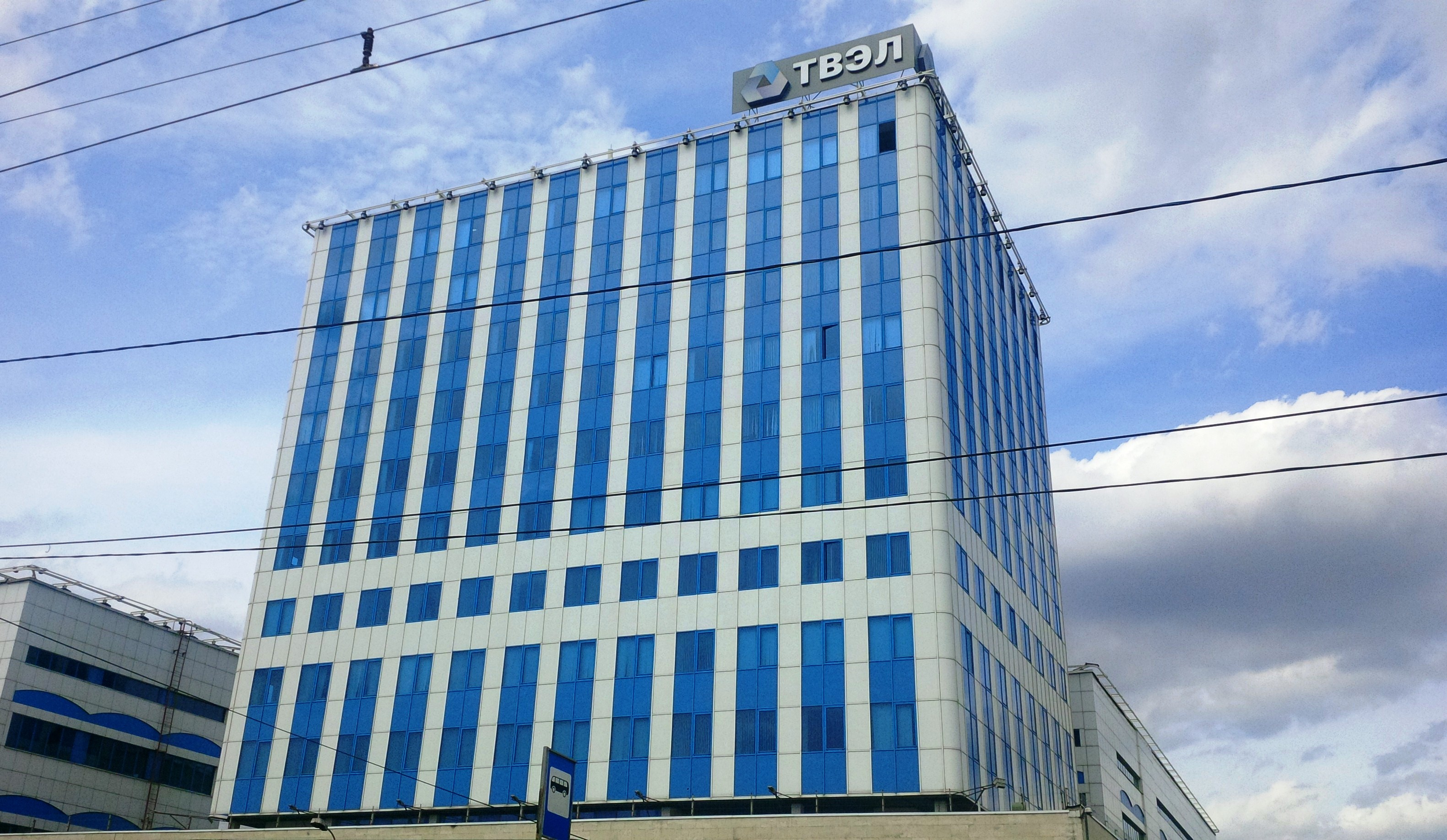
- TVEL building in Moscow
- Type: Open joint stock company
- Industry: Nuclear industry
- Founded: 1996
- Headquarters: Moscow
- Key people: Vitaliy Konovalov (Founder); Sergei Sobyanin (Chairman of the board); Anton Badenkov (Acting president)
- Products: Nuclear fuel
- Revenue: $3.17 billion (2017)
- Operating income: $983 million (2017)
- Net income: $82 million (2017)
- Total assets: $6.76 billion (2017)
- Total equity: $5.45 billion (2017)
- Parent: Atomenergoprom (Rosatom)
- Website: www.tvel.ru

TVEL Fuel Company (TVEL; Russian: ТВЭЛ, from тепловыделяющий элемент, lit. 'heat-releasing element, fuel rod'), is a Rosatom-owned nuclear fuel cycle company headquartered in Moscow. It has operated since 1996.

== History and operations ==
The company was founded by Vitaliy Konovalov in 1996. He headed the company until 2000.

It works mainly in uranium enrichment and the production of nuclear fuel. TVEL belongs to the Atomenergoprom holding company (part of Rosatom).

TVEL supplies fuel to the Czech Republic, Slovakia, Bulgaria, Hungary, Ukraine, Armenia, Finland, China and India. In the world, 73 power reactors (17% of the world market by number) and 30 research reactors are currently running with TVEL made fuel.

TVEL is developing the TVS-K fuel assembly for Western-designed reactors. In 2017 TVS-K was in pilot usage at Ringhals Nuclear Power Plant, and larger trials in the French supplied reactors at Koeberg Nuclear Power Station are planned.

The chairman of the board of directors is Yuri Olenin. The president of TVEL is Natalia Nikipelova.

== Subsidiaries ==
Nuclear fuel production

- Mashinostroitelny Zavod Elektrostal
- Novosibirsk Plant of Chemical Concentrates
- Chepetsky Mechanical Plant
- Moscow Plant of Polymetals

Separation-sublimation assets

- Angarsk Electrolysis Chemical Combine
- Zelenogorsk Electrochemical Plant
- Siberian Chemical Combine
- Ural Electrochemical Plant

Research institutes and design bureaus

- Central Design and Technology Institute
- VNIINM
- Novouralsk Scientific and Design Center
- OKB-Nizhny Novgorod
- Centrotech-SPb
- Uralpribor

== See also ==
- Energy policy of Russia
- Nuclear power in Russia
