= Ural Electrochemical Combine =

Nuclear fuel plant in Russia

Coordinates: 57°16′22″N 60°06′26″E

- Company type: Open Joint Stock Company
- Founded: 1945
- Headquarters: Novouralsk, Russia
- Parent: TVEL (Rosatom)
- Website: www.ueip.ru

The Ural Electrochemical Combine (Russian: Уральский электрохимический комбинат) is a company located in Novouralsk, Russia. It is a subsidiary of TVEL (Rosatom group). Beginning in 1949, the plant began the production of Highly Enriched Uranium (HEU).

== History ==
The Ural Electrochemical Combine was important to the Soviet Union due to its history of foreign partnerships. The facility was heavily involved in the expansion of the Lanzhou uranium enrichment plant and another in Shaanxi, China, in the 1990s to serve China's domestic fuel needs. The facility also enriched uranium for Kazakhstan, with the Soviet Union receiving a share of 50%, proportionate to the need to enrich to 6000 tU/yr.

The Soviet Union began replacing its gaseous diffusion equipment with centrifuge technology in the 1960s. By the end of the Cold War, when all equipment had been replaced, the facility had the capacity to produce almost 12 million SWU per year.

The facility is now converted to civilian use and no longer produces highly enriched uranium. Today, the facility enriches uranium for Low-Enriched Uranium (LEU) fuel, and develops technologies for industrial applications. In the early 2000s it accounted for 49% of Russia's enrichment capacity.
