= Electron-beam furnace =

Furnace that uses an electron beam to melt material

An electron-beam furnace (EB furnace) is a type of vacuum furnace employing high-energy electron beam in vacuum as the means for delivery of heat to the material being melted. It is one of the electron-beam technologies.

== Use ==
Electron-beam furnaces are used for production and refining of high-purity metals (especially titanium, vanadium, tantalum, niobium, hafnium, etc.) and some exotic alloys. The EB furnaces use a hot cathode for production of electrons and high voltage for accelerating them towards the target to be melted.

== Alternatives ==
An alternative for an electron-beam furnace can be an electric arc furnace in vacuum. Somewhat similar technologies are electron-beam melting and electron-beam welding.

== See also ==
- Cyclone furnace
