= Novosibirsk Chemical Concentrates Plant =

- Company type: Public Joint Stock Company
- Founded: 1948
- Headquarters: Novosibirsk, Russia
- Revenue: 606,800,000,000 Russian ruble (1994)
- Parent: TVEL (Rosatom group)
- Website: www.nccp.ru

Novosibirsk Chemical Concentrates Plant (Russian: Новосибирский завод химконцентратов) is a company based in Novosibirsk, Russia. It is part of TVEL (Rosatom group).

The Novosibirsk Chemical Concentrates Plant (Khimkontsentrat) is a nuclear-related facility involved in the processing of uranium and other materials, and in reactor fuel fabrication.
