= Zelenogorsk Electrochemical Plant =

Uranium processing plant in Russia

- Company type: Joint-stock company
- Founded: 1955
- Headquarters: Zelenogorsk, Russia
- Parent: TVEL (Rosatom)
- Website: ecp.ru

The JSC Zelenogorsk Electrochemical Plant (Russian: Электрохимический завод) was established in 1962 to produce highly enriched uranium for the Soviet nuclear weapons program. It is a subsidiary of TVEL (Rosatom group), located in Zelenogorsk, formerly the closed city of Krasnoyarsk-45.

== History ==
The plant began in 1962 as a gaseous diffusion plant, and began to produce enriched uranium in 1964. At this time, the U.S. intelligence community predicted that the plant would reach its design capacity in 1967, but the plant was not fully operational until 1970. Since becoming fully operational and through the end of the Cold War, the facility's enrichment capacity ranged from 1 million SWU/yr to 6-7 million SWU/yr.

In the early 1960s, the Soviets began to replace their gaseous diffusion machines with centrifuges, but it was not until 1990 that the final gaseous diffusion cascade was shut down.

The Electrochemical Plant in Krasnoyarsk-45 currently accounts for 29 percent of Russia's enrichment capacity. It has been converted to civilian use and no longer produces any highly enriched uranium. Since 1997, the facility has been involved in down-blending highly enriched uranium (HEU) from dismantled weapons under the U.S.-Russian HEU agreement. The plants primary activities include processing, transportation, and storage of Low-Enriched Uranium (LEU) fuel.
