= Ferroniobium =

Alloy of niobium and iron

Ferroniobium is an important iron-niobium alloy, with a niobium content of 60-70%. It is the main source for niobium alloying of HSLA steel and covers more than 80% of the worldwide niobium production. The niobium is mined from pyrochlore deposits and is subsequently transformed into the niobium pentoxide Nb_{2}O_{5}. This oxide is mixed with iron oxide and aluminium and is reduced in an aluminothermic reaction to niobium and iron. The component metals can be purified in an electron beam furnace or the alloy can be used as it is. For alloying with steel the ferroniobium is added to molten steel before casting. The largest producers of ferroniobium are the same as for niobium and are located in Brazil and Canada.
