= Niobium oxide =

Niobium oxide, archaically called columbium oxide, may refer to:

- Niobium monoxide (niobium(II) oxide), NbO
- Niobium dioxide (niobium(IV) oxide), NbO_{2}
- Niobium pentoxide (niobium(V) oxide), Nb_{2}O_{5}

In addition to the above, other distinct oxides exist

- general formula Nb_{3n+1}O_{8n−2} where n ranges from 5 - 8 inclusive, e.g. Nb_{8}O_{19} (Nb_{16}O_{38}).
- Nb_{12}O_{29} and Nb_{47}O_{116}

Natural niobium oxide is sometimes known as niobia.
