= Ministry of Medium Machine-Building =

USSR government ministry supervising nuclear industry

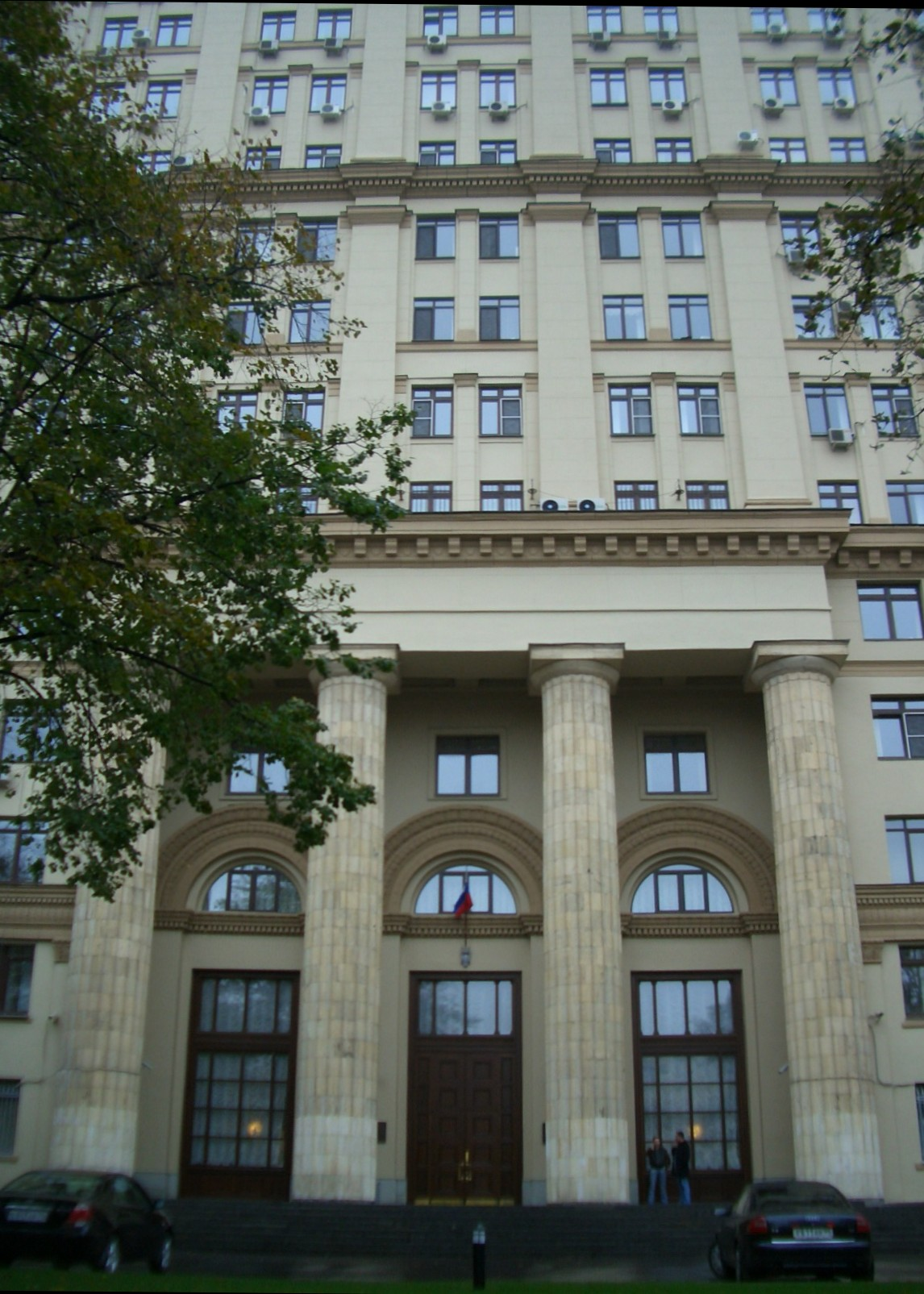
Headquarters in Moscow

The Ministry of Medium Machine-Building (Russian: Министерство среднего машиностроения СССР - Минсредмаш СССР, МСМ СССР, also known as Sredmash) was a government ministry of the Soviet Union which supervised the Soviet nuclear industry, including production of nuclear warheads.

== History ==
The ministry was established on the basis of the First Chief Directorate (nuclear industry) and the Third Chief Directorate (development in the area controlled missiles, aircraft, rockets and long range missiles) of the Council of Ministers of the USSR as well as the Central Board of Industrial Building of the Ministry of Internal Affairs of the USSR (Главпромстрой МВД) charged with construction of nuclear installations, all of which were in operation since September 1942.

The Ministry of Medium Machine Building was established by a Decree of the Presidium of the Supreme Soviet on 26 June 1953. The Central Intelligence Agency initially believed that the ministry oversaw the war industry. On September 11, 1989, after merging with the Ministry of Atomic Energy, the Ministry of Medium Machine Building was renamed the Ministry of Atomic Energy and Industry of the USSR (Министерство атомной энергетики и промышленности СССР).

== List of ministers ==
- Vyacheslav Malyshev (17.7.1953 – 28.2.1955)
- Avraami Zavenyagin (28.2.1955 – 21.1.1956)
- Nikolai Smelyakov (21.1.1956 – 10.5.1957) (acting)
- Mikhail Pervukhin (10.5.1957 – 24.7.1957)
- Efim Slavsky (24.7.1957 – 22.11.1986)
- Lev Ryabev (22.11.1986 – 17.7.1989)
- Oleg Shishkin (17.7.1989 – 25.12.1991)

== See also ==
- Ministry of General Machine Building, Soviet ministry of space industry
