= Zelenogorsk, Krasnoyarsk Krai =

Closed town in Krasnoyarsk Krai, Russia

Zelenogorsk Зеленогорск
- Town
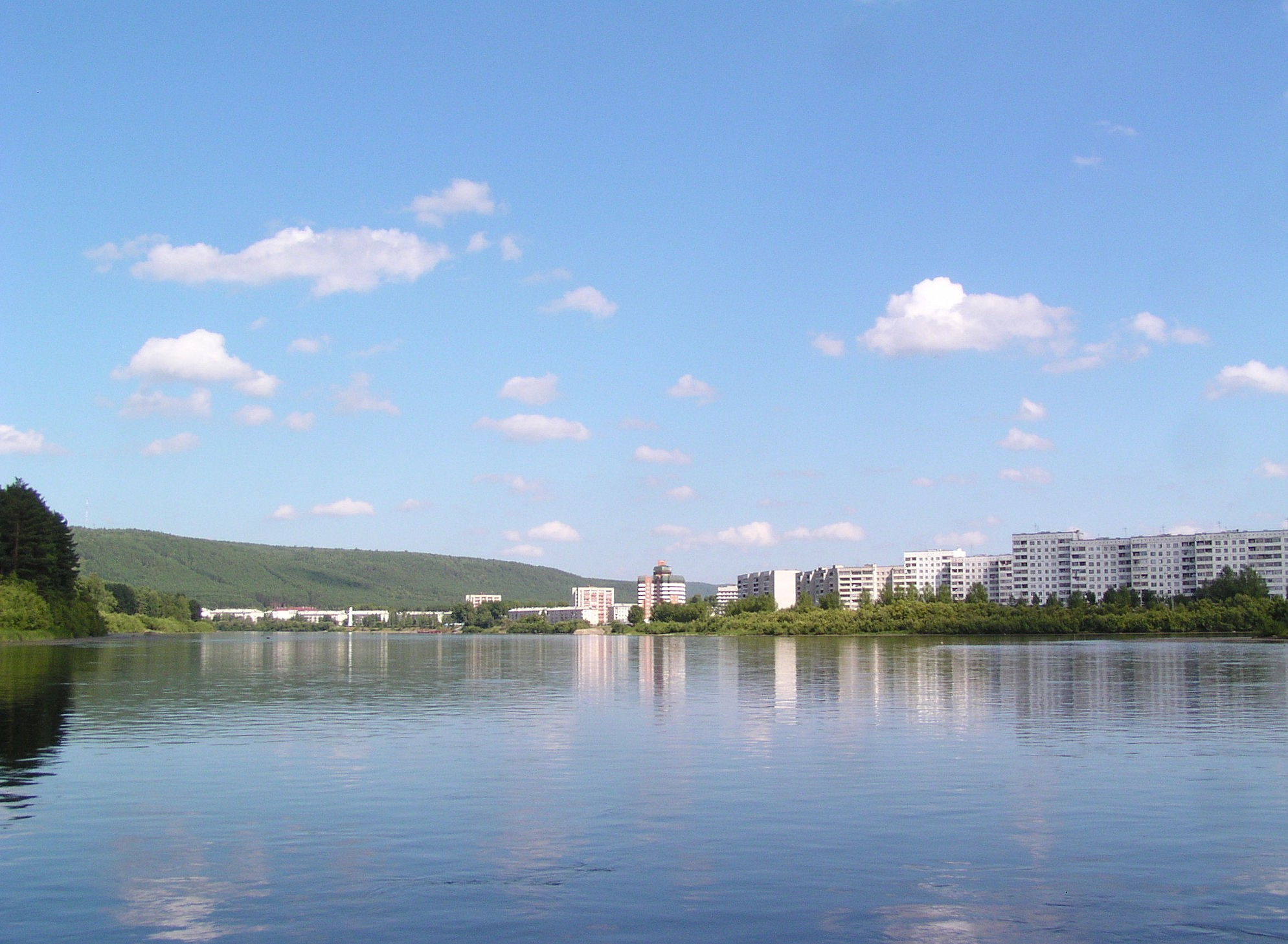
- View of Zelenogorsk

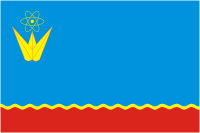
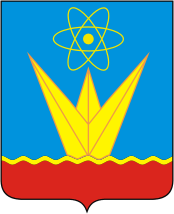
- Flag Coat of arms
- Interactive map of Zelenogorsk
- Location of Zelenogorsk Zelenogorsk (Krasnoyarsk Krai)
- Coordinates: 56°06′00″N 94°35′00″E
- Country: Russia
- Federal subject: Krasnoyarsk Krai
- Founded: 1956
- Town status since: 1956

Government
  - Mayor: Speranskii Mikhail Viktorovich

Area
  - Total: 162.1 km^{2} (62.6 sq mi)
- Elevation: 170 m (560 ft)

Population (2021 Census)
  - Total: 54,279
  - Estimate (2025): 52,389 (−3.5%)
  - Rank: 298th in 2021
  - Density: 334.8/km^{2} (867.3/sq mi)

Administrative status
  - Subordinated to: closed administrative-territorial formation of Zelenogorsk
  - Capital of: closed administrative-territorial formation of Zelenogorsk

Municipal status
  - Urban okrug: Zelenogorsk Urban Okrug
  - Capital of: Zelenogorsk Urban Okrug
- Time zone: UTC+7 (MSK+4)
- Postal code: 663690
- Dialing code: +7 39169
- OKTMO ID: 04737000001
- Website: www.zeladmin.ru

Zelenogorsk (Russian: Зеленогорск, IPA: [zʲɪlʲɪnɐˈgorsk]) is a closed town in Krasnoyarsk Krai, Russia, located on the left bank of the Kan River 180 kilometers (110 mi) above its confluence with the Yenisei River. It was formerly known as Krasnoyarsk-45 (Красноя́рск-45) and was involved in enriching uranium for the Soviet nuclear program. As of 2021, its population was 54,279 (2021 census).

Historical population
Year	Pop.	±%
1959	9,200	—
1979	48,700	+429.3%
2002	69,355	+42.4%
2010	66,056	−4.8%
2021	54,279	−17.8%
Source: Census data

== History ==
It was granted town status in 1956.

As a closed town, it went under the code-name Krasnoyarsk-45 until Russian president Boris Yeltsin decreed, in 1992, that such cities could use their historical names. The town appeared on no official maps until then. As is the tradition with Soviet towns containing secret facilities, the designation "Krasnoyarsk-45" is actually a postcode; it implied that the place was located directly in the city of Krasnoyarsk, but really 160 kilometers (99 mi) from it. The city still remains closed, by a vote of the inhabitants. Access is possible only by having a special entry permit issued by the city's authorities.

== Administrative and municipal status ==
Within the framework of administrative divisions, it is incorporated as the closed administrative-territorial formation of Zelenogorsk—an administrative unit with the status equal to that of the districts. As a municipal division, the closed administrative-territorial formation of Zelenogorsk is incorporated as Zelenogorsk Urban Okrug.

== International relations ==
It is a sister city with Newburyport, Massachusetts, United States.
