= Uranium mining in Kazakhstan =

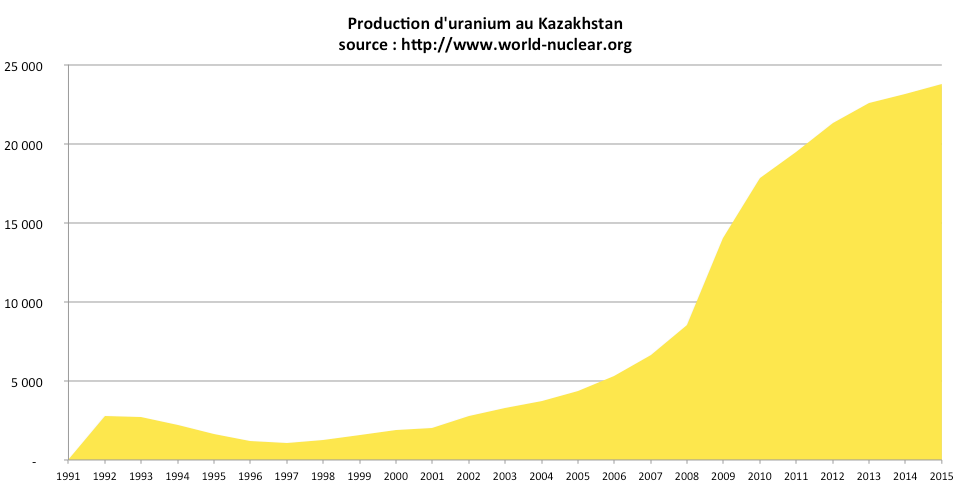

Uranium mining in Kazakhstan is of considerable importance to the national economy. Kazakhstan has been the world's largest producer of uranium since 2009. Kazatomprom, which is majority-owned by Kazakhstan's sovereign wealth fund Samruk-Kazyna, acts as the operator for uranium mines in Kazakhstan.

== History ==
Uranium exploration in Kazakhstan began in 1943. Later, in 1970, mining began with positive results, leading to more exploration. Some underground mines from the 1950s remain, but are close to depletion. In the past half century, Kazakhstan has been a major source of uranium for the world's nuclear programs. In the decade from 2001 to 2011, Kazakhstan's uranium production increased by 17,428 tons. Kazakhstan has 15% of the world's uranium, and in 2011, Kazakhstan was responsible for 35% of world production and in 2024 it was responsible for 38%.

Currently, 50 deposits are located in six provinces. The responsibility for uranium exploration falls upon two subsidiary organizations of the Ministry of Geology, “Stepgeology” in northern Kazakhstan and “Volkovgeology” in the southern part of the country. Though there is no nationally supported electrical grid, in northern areas of Kazakhstan, electricity comes from Russia, and in the south, Uzbekistan and Kyrgyzstan.

China's uranium procurement approach includes investment in foreign mining operations. Chinese investment in Kazakhstan mines have contributed to Kazakhstan's current position as the world's largest exporter of uranium. Multiple foreign companies have shares in Kazakhstan's uranium mines, including Cameco, China General Nuclear Power Group, Rosatom subsidiary Uranium One, Orano and a subsidiary of State Power Investment Corporation.

== Companies ==
Kazatomprom, the nationalized nuclear energy company, was started in 1997. It has oversight of all nuclear activities including mining, exploration, and import/export activities. The company has also formed strong ties with foreign nuclear powers and the company Westinghouse. Agreements are in place with the governments of Russia, Japan, China, Canada, India, and France. Comparing 2010 with 2009, it reported an over forty percent increase in uranium production, and a thirty percent increase in total uranium output.

== Mines ==
- Inkai Uranium Project- discovered 1976. 2010 production: 1637 tons
- South Inkai mine - began production 2007. expected 2011 production: 1900 tons
- Akdala mine - began production: 2006. 2009 production: 1046 tons
- Central Mynkuduk mine - began production: 2007.
- West Mynkuduk mine - began production: 2006
- East Mynkuduk mine- began production: 2006
- Karatau mine - began production: 2008
- Akbastau mine - began production: 2009
- Zhalpak mine- began production: 2012
- Moinkum mine - began production: 2004
- Tortkuduk mine - began production: 2008
- Kharasan mine- began production: 2005
- Irkol mine - began production:2008
- Zarechnoye mine- began production:2006
- Semyibai mine- began production: 2009

== See also ==
- Energy policy of Kazakhstan
- Semipalatinsk Test Site
- Anti-nuclear movement in Kazakhstan
- Kharasan mine
