= Uranium One =

Russian group of companies

Uranium One Inc.
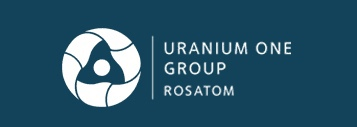
- Formerly: Southern Cross Resources Inc. SXR Uranium One Inc.
- Company type: Group of companies
- Industry: Uranium industry (ISIC 3)
- Predecessors: Southern Cross Resources Inc. Aflease Gold and Uranium Resources Ltd.,
- Founded: 2 January 1997
- Headquarters: Moscow, Russia
- Key people: Andrey Shutov (President of JSC Uranium One Group)
- Products: Uranium; Lithium; Biofuels
- Number of employees: 201–500
- Parent: Part of the TENEX Group
- Website: https://uranium1.com

Uranium One is an international group of companies, part of the management circuit of the TENEX Group of Rosatom State Corporation. Since 2013, it is a wholly owned subsidiary of Moscow-based Uranium One Group, a part of the Russian state-owned nuclear corporation Rosatom.

== History ==
The company was established as Southern Cross Resources Inc. on January 2, 1997, in Toronto, Canada. It was listed on the Toronto Stock Exchange on August 25, 1997. In 2005, Southern Cross Resources Inc. reverse merged with South African Aflease Gold and Uranium Resources Ltd. under the name SXR Uranium One Inc. After merger, the company received secondary listing on the Johannesburg Stock Exchange. Aflease Gold and Uranium Resources Ltd. became a subsidiary of SXR Uranium One and was renamed Uranium One Africa Ltd. The main uranium asset of Aflease was the Dominion mine. The gold assets of Aflease were divested by 2008 and Uranium One Africa was sold in 2010 to Gupta family.

In 2007, Uranium One Inc. acquired UrAsia Energy Ltd. And a 70% stake in the Akdala and South Inkai uranium mines, as well as a 30% stake in the Kyzylkum venture in Kazakhstan. In June 2009, JSC Atomredmetzoloto (ARMZ), a subsidiary of Rosatom, acquired a 16.6 percent stake in Uranium One in exchange for a 50 percent stake in its joint venture with Kazatomprom Karatau.

In the same year, Uranium One bought the Shootaring Uranium Mill from the United States Enrichment Corporation. It was sold to Anfield Energy in 2015. Also in 2007, Uranium One acquired Energy Metals Corporation which owned the Hobson uranium processing plant in Texas, and uranium exploration properties located in Wyoming and Texas. The Hobson uranium processing plant and assets in Texas were sold to Uranium Energy Corporation in 2009.

In 2009, the Rosatom subsidiary ARMZ acquired 16.6% of shares in Uranium One in exchange for a 50% interest in the Karatau uranium mining project, a joint venture with Kazatomprom. In 2010, Uranium One acquired 50% and 49% respective interests in southern Kazakhstan-based Akbastau and Zarechnoye uranium mines from ARMZ. In exchange, ARMZ increased its stake in Uranium One to 51%. In 2010, Uranium One acquired Irigaray uranium processing plant, the Christensen Ranch satellite uranium processing facility and associated uranium exploration properties in the Powder River Basin in Wyoming from the joint venture of AREVA and Électricité de France. In December 2010, ARMZ increased its stake in Uranium One to 51.4%. At the time of the 2010 sale, the U.S. Nuclear Regulatory Commission estimated that Uranium One held the rights to approximately 20% of the licensed uranium ore production capacity in the United States which in its entirety amounted to 0.2% of the world's uranium production. By 2017 additional mining licenses had been issued to other operators, shrinking Uranium One's share of U.S. production capacity to approximately 10%.

ARMZ took complete control of Uranium One in January 2013 by buying all shares it did not already own. In October 2013, Uranium One Inc. was delisted from the Toronto and Johannesburg exchanges and became a wholly owned indirect subsidiary of Rosatom. From 2012 to 2014, an unspecified amount of Uranium was reportedly exported to Canada via a Kentucky-based trucking firm with an existing export license; most of the processed uranium was returned to the U.S., with approximately 25% going to Western Europe and Japan. In 2015, Uranium One relocated certain head office functions such as finance, internal audit and some technical services to Moscow. In 2017, Uranium One established a trading company Uranium One Trading in Zug, Switzerland. However, in January 2018, trading functions of the company were transferred to Techsnabexport, an export arm of Rosatom.

In 2010–2013, Uranium One acquired Mantra Resources, the developer of Mkuju River mine in Tanzania. The Mkuju River project was suspended in 2017 due to the low uranium price. In 2015, Uranium One Australia, the owner of the Uranium One's Australian operations, including the Honeymoon Uranium Project, was sold to Boss Resources. In August 2018, Uranium One closed its Willow Creek mine in Wyoming.

In 2017, Uranium One Trading A. started its trading company. G in Zug, Switzerland. The company aims to increase its share in the international market by carrying out spot and medium-term trading in natural uranium.

At the end of 2019, Uranium One's mineral resource base is estimated at 512.7 thousand tons. Uranium production for the year amounted to 4,6 tonnes.

In 2019, Uranium One's operations were transferred to TENEX (a global brand of TENEX).

In the reporting year, the mineral resource base of Uranium One's enterprises according to international reporting standards was 192 thousand tons (197.1 thousand tons in 2018).

In 2020, Uranium One made its first shipment of wood pellets to a customer in Italy. More than 3 thousand tons of products were delivered by sea.

== Operations ==
Through its subsidiaries and joint ventures Uranium One owns Akdala, South Inkai, Karatau, Akbastau and Kharasan uranium mines in Kazakhstan, the conserved Willow Creek uranium mine in the United States, and the Mkuju River uranium project in Tanzania. In Namibia, Uranium One Headspring Pty., a subsidiary of Uranium One, is conducting exploration work. Exploration and pilot works are planned until 2027.

In 2020, Uranium One sold 11.8 million pounds (5,400 t) of triuranium octoxide (U_{3}O_{8}).

Uranium One is considering lithium mining projects in Chile, Argentina, and Bolivia.

In 2020, Uranium One started to supply wood pellets produced in Russia.

In June 2023, Bolivia signed an agreement with Rosatom through its Uranium One Group to develop its lithium reserves, which are the largest in the world. Uranium One will invest $600 million in the project and conduct the feasibility and pre-investment studies.

== Ownership ==
Uranium One Inc. is an indirect subsidiary of the Russian state-owned nuclear corporation Rosatom. It is directly owned by the Amsterdam-based Uranium One Holding N.V. (89.07%) and Moscow-based Uranium One Group (former name: Uranium Mining Company; 10.93%). Uranium One Holding is wholly owned by Uranium One Group. Uranium One Group is owned by Rosatom direct subsidiaries Atomenergoprom (71.084%) and ARMZ (28.916%). Uranium One Group is managed by Techsnabexport.

== Uranium One controversy ==
A conspiracy theory launched during the 2016 presidential election campaign accused Bill Clinton, the Clinton Foundation, Hillary Clinton, the Obama administration, high level officials in Russia, the State Department, Uranium One, and the FBI of allegedly compromising national-security interests, bribery, and suppressing evidence. All parties have denied the accusations, and no evidence of wrongdoing has been found after five years of allegations, an FBI investigation, a House Intelligence Committee inquiry, and the 2017 appointment by the Justice Department of the U.S. Attorney in Utah, John Huber, to evaluate the FBI investigation. Huber's inquiry ended in January 2019 without any findings of consequence.

== Activities ==
Uranium exploration and mining

Uranium One is engaged in natural uranium mining, exploration and development of uranium deposits in Kazakhstan, the United States, Tanzania, and Namibia. The company produces about 4,6 thousand tons of natural uranium per year. Uranium One supplies natural uranium to energy companies in Europe, North America, and Asia.

Kazakhstan

Uranium One is a participant in six joint uranium mines with NAC Kazatomprom, the national nuclear corporation of Kazakhstan: Akdala, South Inkai, Karatau, Akbastau, Zarechnoye and Kharasan.

== See also ==
- List of uranium mines
- Uranium Participation Corporation
- CFIUS
