= Sprott Physical Uranium Trust =

Toronto-based holding company

- Type: Public
- Traded as: TSX: U.U
- Industry: Financial services
- Founded: 2005
- Headquarters: Toronto, Canada

The Sprott Physical Uranium Trust (formerly the Uranium Participation Corporation; TSX: U.U) is a Toronto-based holding company investing nearly all of its assets in uranium, both in the form of uranium oxide (U_{3}O_{8}) or uranium hexafluoride (UF_{6}), with the primary investment objective of achieving capital appreciation in the value of its uranium holdings.

== Structure ==
The common shares represent an indirect interest in physical uranium owned by the Sprott Physical Uranium Trust. The mission of the corporation is to provide an investment alternative for investors interested in holding uranium. The structure of the corporation allows it to be purely a holding company play on uranium, with no operational details in its consolidated annual filings.

Sprott Physical Uranium Trust was incorporated as the Uranium Participation Corporation on March 15, 2005. At least 85% of net proceeds of any equity offering were to be invested in uranium. The Sprott Physical Uranium Trust buys and holds uranium assets and does not actively speculate on short-term prices. UPC was set up by Eric Sprott.

The Sprott Physical Uranium Trust held a significant stake in Uranium One before the latter was purchased outright by ARMZ Uranium Holding in January 2013 for $1.3 billion.

The uranium holdings are physically stored in duly licensed facilities located in Canada, France, and the United States.

In July 2021, the Canada-based commodities investment manager Sprott took over the Uranium Participation Corporation. It was renamed to the Sprott Physical Uranium Trust.

== Relationship with Denison Mines ==
Because Uranium Participation does not have a license to purchase and hold uranium directly, the fund buys and holds the commodity through Denison Mines, which it controls for this purpose. Denison Mines is the manager of the corporation and does not have any ownership interest in UPC.

== Luxembourg subsidiary UPCL ==
In March 2013, the Cyprus government reached an agreement with the Eurogroup to receive a €10 billion loan to refinance its public debt and achieve its macroeconomic targets. As a condition of receiving the Eurogroup loan, Cyprus’s two major banks, Laiki Bank and Bank of Cyprus were restructured to restore their capital requirements. Uninsured deposits greater than €100,000 were subject to conversions into Bank of Cyprus shares. On February 28, 2013, UPC held approximately €13,000 in Cyprus bank accounts therefore these funds should be fully insured and are not anticipated to be impacted by the bank restructurings. UPC's uranium held by Uranium Participation Cyprus Limited’s Luxembourg branch is also not impacted by the Eurogroup bailout of Cyprus.

The substantively enacted future tax rates, in UPC’s various jurisdictions, range from 3.0% to 26.5%. In fiscal 2013, the Corporation incurred current tax recoveries of $13,000 and future tax recoveries of $3,021,000. The combined tax recoveries for the year of $3,034,000 reflected an effective tax rate of approximately 3.1% compared to tax recoveries of $18,997,000 and an effective tax rate of 7.8% in the prior year. The decline in the effective tax rate is primarily a result of an increase in the proportion of deductible temporary differences arising in the year that have not been benefited as deferred tax assets or used to offset tax liabilities, and an increase in the proportion of inventory held by the Luxembourg branch of UPC’s wholly owned subsidiary, Uranium Participation Cyprus Limited, which is taxed at the lowest rate within the Corporation.

== See also ==
- Gold exchange-traded fund
- Minor metals
- Peak uranium
- Sprott Molybdenum Participation Corporation
- Uranium bubble of 2007
- Uranium as an investment
- Uranium mining in the Elliot Lake area
