= Zarechny =

Zarechny (masculine), Zarechnaya (feminine), or Zarechnoye (neuter) may refer to:

- Zarechny (inhabited locality) (Zarechnaya, Zarechnoye), name of several inhabited localities in Russia
- Zarechny Urban Okrug, name of several urban okrugs in Russia
- Zarechny (volcano), a somma volcano on Kamchatka Peninsula, Russia
- Zarechnaya (Nizhny Novgorod Metro), a station of the Nizhny Novgorod Metro, Russia
- Zarechnoye mine, a uranium mine in Kazakhstan
