= Atominform =

Soviet-Russian research institute

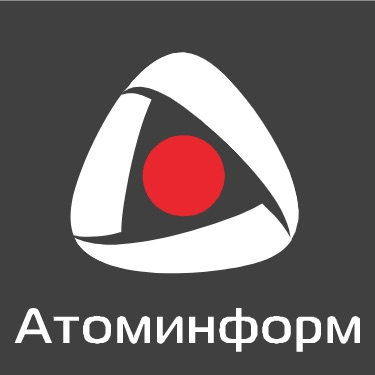
- Native name: ЦНИИАТОМИНФОРМ
- Type: Federal state unitary enterprise
- Founded: 1967
- Defunct: 2000
- Fate: Reorganisation
- Headquarters: Moscow, Russia

Atominform (Central Research and Development Institute for Management, Economics and Information of the Ministry of Nuclear Industry of the Russian Federation) was a research and development institute that existed from 1967 to 2010 in Moscow, Russian Federation.

== Activities ==
The institute provided a range of consultancy services in the areas of management, economic and information to the central Russian government, companies related to nuclear energy, industrial holdings, federal subjects of the Russian Federation and state companies.

The institute played a crucial role in the course of major reforms of the nuclear energy sector from 2005 to 2009. In particular, Atominform was responsible for the methodological and organisational support of the restructuring of the industry, foundation of Atomenergoprom holding and Rosatom state corporation. It developed the ERP system of Rosatom (powered by Oracle Database software).

== History ==
Atominform (then known as Central Research and Development Institute for Information and Technoeconomic Studies in Nuclear Science and Technology [TsNIIatominform]) of the Ministry of Medium Machine-building Industry of the USSR was founded in 1967 by a decree of the USSR Council of Ministers.

In 1991 Atominform was reorganised as Central Research and Development Institute for Management, Economy and Information of the Ministry of Nuclear Energy and Industry of the USSR in order to assist the nuclear sector in its adaptation to market economy.

In 2007 the Institute developed and supervised a model pilot project that aimed to radically increase the economic efficiency of the sector and created a plan for the accelerated reorganisation of the industry as a part of the reform.

Also, in 2007 the Institute organised the first industrial conference for the representatives of the nuclear energy industry and its suppliers.

In March 2009 as a result of ongoing reorganisation the functions of the Institute were reassigned to newly created independent organisations. Its building at 2 Dmitrovskoye Highway in Moscow was assigned to the Engineering company “Atomstroiexport” - nuclear power equipment and service exporter, division of Rosatom.

== Awards ==
In 2008 Atominform achieved top positions in 5 nominations according to Expert Rating Agency: Strategy and Business Development Consultancy, Financial Management Consultancy, Legal Consultancy, Goods and Services Production Consultancy, Marketing and PR Consultancy.

== Directors ==
Vladimir Fyodorovich Semyonov (1967–1977)
Igor Alekseyevich Arkhangelsky (1977–1989)
Vladimir Georgievich Terentyev (1989–1999)
Nikolai Egorovich Yakovlev (1999–2004)
Pyotr Georgievich Shchedrovitsky (2004–2006)
Mikhail Vasilyevich Pozdeyev (2006–2007)
Eldar Muratovich Urmancheyev (2007–2009)
