= TENEX =

TENEX may refer to:

- TENEX (operating system)
- Techsnabexport, a Russian company specializing in export of nuclear materials
- Tenex, a brand name for the medication guanfacine, a sympatholytic used to treat hypertension, ADHD and anxiety
- Tenex, a brand name for .22 LR ammunition manufactured by Eley Limited and widely used in high level competition such as the ISSF World Cup and Olympic Games
- 10X, an alternative name for superfine powdered sugar or confectioner's sugar
- 10x, internet slang for "thanks"; see wikt:10x

== See also ==
- TENEX C shell
