= Minor metals =

Industrial byproduct

Minor metals is a widely used term in the metal industry that generally refers to metals which are a by-product of smelting a base metal. Minor metals do not have a real exchange, and are not traded on the London Metal Exchange (LME).

== Characteristics ==
Two characteristics are regularly associated with minor metals: (1) their global production is relatively small in comparison to base metals, and (2), they are predominantly extracted as by-products of base metals. However, due to the diversity of the metals often classified as minor metals, there is still much discussion about what exactly defines a minor metal. Minor metals have a wide variety of uses, including pharmaceutical, semiconductor, automotive, glass, battery, solar and many others. Many of these minor metals are critical to 21st century technology. They are more difficult to extract from their naturally occurring host minerals than base metals.

== Industry ==
According to the Minor Metals Trade Association (MMTA), its members alone account for over US$10 billion in annual trade of minor metal products.

== Production ==
Recent research based on data from the United States Geological Survey (USGS) indicates that China is not only the leading primary producer of minor metals, supplying about 40 percent of all production, but that China's share of global production increased 34 percent between 2000 and 2009.

== Applications ==
Minor metals are used in a wide diversity of end-use applications, from capacitors for consumer electronics (tantalum) and metallic cathodes for rechargeable batteries (cobalt) to photovoltaic solar cells (silicon) and semiconductor materials (gallium and indium). The primary end-uses of minor metals can also help to categorize the metals into four groups:

1. Electronic metals (e.g. gallium and germanium)
2. Power metals (e.g. molybdenum and zirconium)
3. Structural metals (e.g. chromium and vanadium)
4. Performance metals (e.g. titanium and rhenium)

== Minor metals ==
Metals often classified as minor metals include: antimony (Sb), arsenic (As), beryllium (Be), bismuth (Bi), cadmium (Cd), cerium (Ce), chromium (Cr), cobalt (Co), gadolinium (Gd), gallium (Ga), germanium (Ge), hafnium (Hf), indium (In), lithium (Li), magnesium (Mg), manganese (Mn), mercury (Hg), molybdenum (Mo), neodymium (Nd), niobium (Nb), iridium (Ir), osmium (Os), praseodymium (Pr), rhenium (Re), rhodium (Rh), ruthenium (Ru), samarium (Sm), selenium (Se), silicon (Si), tantalum (Ta), tellurium (Te), titanium (Ti), tungsten (W), vanadium (V), and zirconium (Zr).

== See also ==
- Noble metal
- Sprott Molybdenum Participation Corporation
- Uranium Participation Corporation
- Vital Materials
