= Noble elements =

Elements that are considered "noble" include:

- noble gases
- noble metals
