= Mkuju River mine =

Uranium mine in Tanzania

- Location: Ruvuma Region, Tanzania
- Products: uranium

The Mkuju River mine is a large open pit mine located in the southern part of Tanzania in Ruvuma Region. Mkuju River represents one of the largest uranium reserves in Tanzania having estimated reserves of 182.1 million tonnes of ore grading 0.025% uranium. The mine has been developed by Mantra Tanzania, a subsidiary of the Uranium One Group which is owned by the Russian Rosatom. In 2017 Mantra suspended further development of the project because of low uranium prices. In 2020 they announced to resume extraction by applying solution mining (in-situ recovery (ISR), which it claimed to be an eco-friendly technology, in spite of the risks it brings to the underground water reserves.
