= Zarechny Urban Okrug =

Location of Penza Oblast in Russia

Location of Sverdlovsk Oblast in Russia

Zarechny Urban Okrug is the name of several municipal formations in Russia. The following administrative divisions are incorporated as such:

- Town of Oblast Significance of Zarechny, Penza Oblast
- Town of Zarechny, Sverdlovsk Oblast

== See also ==
- Zarechny (disambiguation)
