= Vital Materials =

Chinese refiner of minor metals

- Company type: Private
- Founded: 1995; 31 years ago
- Founders: Zhu Shihui
- Headquarters: Guangdong

Vital Materials is a company established in 1995 that primarily refines minor metals.

== History ==
Zhu Shihui, formerly an employee of Sumitomo, founded the firm in 1995. Vital Materials purchased a large amount of indium at auction formerly held by Fanya Metal Exchange in 2020.
