= Sprott School of Business =

Business school of Carleton University

Coordinates: 45.382°N 75.7°W

- Type: Public business school
- Established: 1949; 77 years ago
- Parent institution: Carleton University
- Accreditation: AACSB
- Dean: Howard Nemiroff
- Location: Ottawa, Ontario, Canada
- Campus: Urban
- Website: sprott.carleton.ca

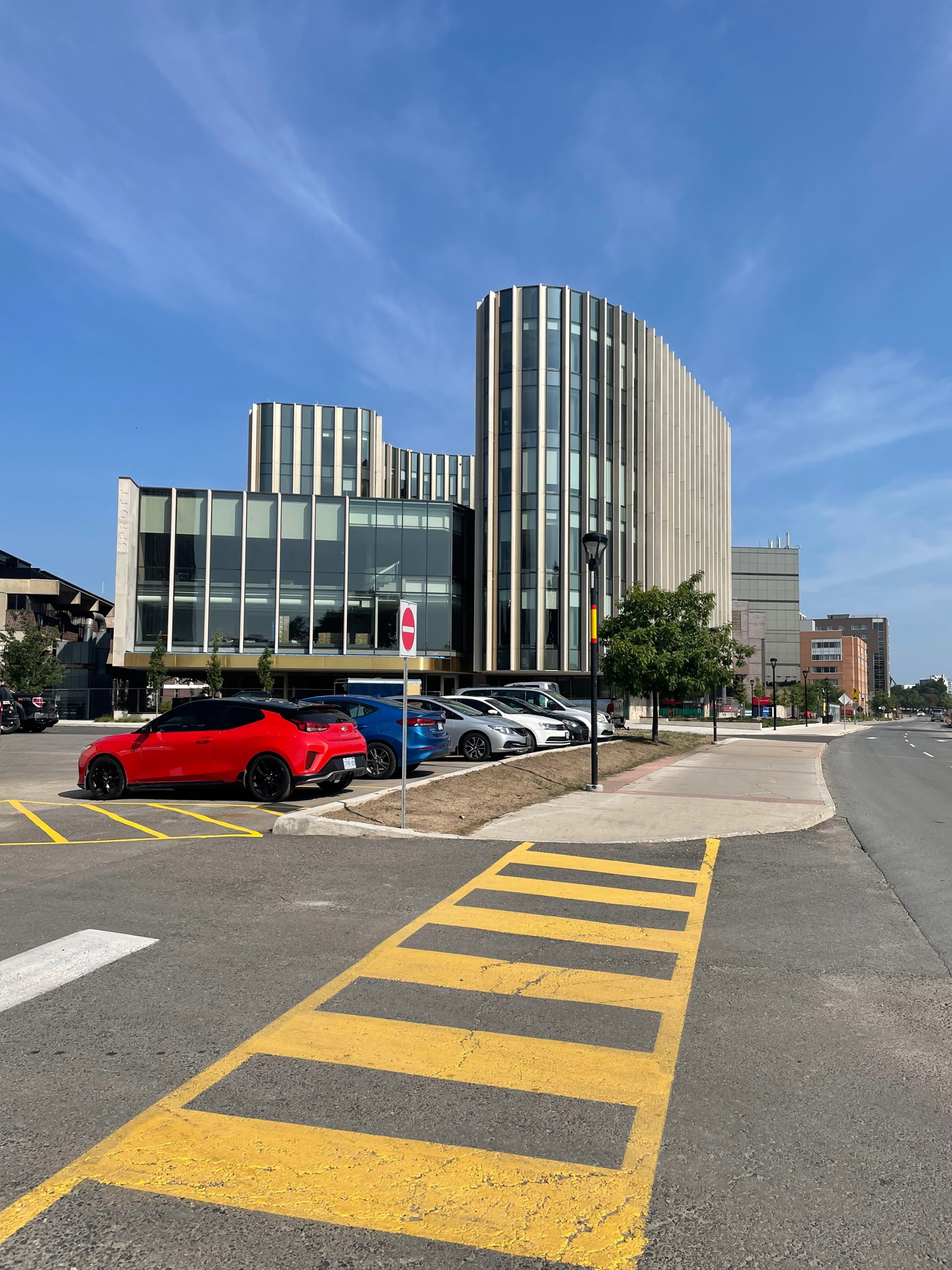
The Nicol Building, home of the Sprott School of Business at Carleton University

The Sprott School of Business is a doctoral-granting business school at Carleton University in Ottawa, Ontario, Canada – the nation's capital. It is accredited by the Association to Advance Collegiate Schools of Business (AACSB) and the Network of International Business Schools (NIBS). The school explores complex management issues through its programs, interdisciplinary research and collaborative partnerships. It was named in 2001 for Eric Sprott, a well-known philanthropist, alumnus of the school, and precious-metals investor.

Business studies have a long history at Carleton, with the first commerce degrees awarded in 1949. Today, the Sprott School of Business offers a range of undergraduate, graduate, and professional programs. The school is also highly research-oriented. Among its accolades, Sprott has won the Overall Institution Performance Award for research contribution at the Administrative Sciences Association of Canada (ASAC) conference in 2004, 2005, 2006, 2007, 2008, 2010, and 2012, the most such honours among all Canadian business schools.

== Programs ==
=== Bachelor of Commerce ===
The Sprott School of Business offers a 4-year Bachelor of Commerce (Honours) degree, with a variety of concentrations and opportunities for co-operative education (co-op). The ability to choose as many as two concentrations in their degree enables students to customize their learning experience to meet their specific academic and career goals.

To earn a Bachelor of Commerce degree students must demonstrate proficient knowledge in the following base level courses: Marketing, Human Resources, Information Systems, Statistics, Finance, Economics, Ethics, Strategic Management, Organizational Theory, Organizational Behaviour, and Financial and Managerial Accounting.

==== Concentrations ====
- Accounting — A concentration geared towards providing students the knowledge to challenge the Chartered Accountant, Certified Management Accountant, or Certified General Accountant designation exams. It covers Financial, Managerial, Taxation, and Auditing Accounting fields specifically.
- Finance — The Finance Concentration at Carleton is structured to cover all the required topics tested on the Chartered Financial Analyst level 1 exam. It covers Investments, Corporate Finance, Mergers and acquisitions, Derivatives, and a prep course for writing finance based research reports.
- Information Systems
- International Business
- Management (previously named Managing People and Organizations)
- Marketing
- Operations Management
- Entrepreneurship
- General

=== Bachelor of International Business ===
Founded in 1995, the Bachelor of International Business was the first program of its kind in Canada. Taking the core of the Commerce program, adding a mandatory language study, foreign exchange to a country where that language is spoken, and an international focus to many of the business classes, the program is designed to prepare students for a business career in the international arena, whether it be with international corporations, government agencies, or developmental organizations.

Currently, students can study Japanese, German, French, Spanish, and Mandarin, and travel on exchange to such diverse locales as Argentina, Austria, Belgium, Chile, China, France, Germany, Japan, Mexico, Peru or Spain. These locations are based on existing exchange agreements with Carleton, as well as the availability of courses in Carleton's language programs as students are expected to complete two full-year courses of language study prior to going abroad.

==== Concentrations ====
- International Marketing and Trade
- Strategic Management and International Human Resources
- International Investment, Finance, and Banking

=== Master of Business Administration ===
While Sprott's MBA program is relatively new, it was developed from the previous Master of Management Studies program. The school decided to take their largely research-centred program, and refocus it into a program more targeted towards practical applications.

=== Doctoral program ===
The Sprott Ph.D. in Management is a research-focused program. It offers a number of interdisciplinary, issue-focused courses to provide a holistic perspective to defining and solving problems.

=== Sprott Competes ===
The Sprott School of Business also operates a comprehensive business case competition training program, known as Sprott Competes, whose aim is to cultivate student skills in integrative thinking, teamwork, decision-making, and effective communication. The program is open to all Sprott students and consists of a mix of course-based and extra-curricular components, including: a business analysis and presentation course, skill-building workshops, an internal case competition and an elite case training squad. Participants in the Sprott Competes program attend a range of national and international case competitions including:

- Jeux du Commerce (JDC) Central
- Queen's University Inter-Collegiate Business Competition (ICBC)
- John Molson Undergraduate Case Competition
- Network of International Business Schools (NIBS) Worldwide Case Competition
- University of Navarra International Case Competition
- University of Vermont Family Enterprise Case Competition

== Student life ==
Multiple Sprott clubs and societies provide numerous opportunities for students to get involved. These include the Sprott Business Students' Society, the Sprott Information Systems Students Association, the Sprott Finance Association, the Sprott International Business Association, the Sprott Marketing Association, and the Sprott Accounting Students Association, in addition to the numerous clubs and societies within Carleton University's general community.

=== SPROSH ===
Beginning in 2009, the Sprott Business Student Society introduced Sprosh, the Fall Orientation Week for Sprott Students. The week for all incoming first year business students, named interns throughout the week, coming into Carleton University. Upper year students take part as the facilitators of the week, all of whom have various roles: presidents, vice presidents, managers and board of directors.

=== Rankings ===
The Sprott School of Business has been ranked 16th overall in Canada, and 1st in its class by Ediversal rankings in 2016.

=== Sprott Student Investment Fund ===
The Sprott Student Investment Fund (SSIF) was founded in 2007 as a charitable organization under the guidance of academic overseer Howard Nemiroff with an endowment from the school of $50,000. It has grown from 8 members to over 20 members as of October 2019 and has been able to maintain a positive margin against the S&P 500 as its benchmark for performance comparison. The aim of the Fund is to educate its participants in how the process of evaluation of investment opportunities takes place with large sums of money. Its focus is on value investing, primarily based on bottom-up economic analysis matched with fundamental analysis. It does not use technical analysis to make meaningful investment decisions but technical analysis is sometimes used to determine entrance and exit opportunities. The Sprott Student Investment Fund is run by students enrolled in the Sprott School of Business and historically has been staffed primarily by students in the undergraduate Finance concentration. Currently, the Fund has over $1M AUM.
