= Willow Creek mine =

Uranium mine in Wyoming, United States

- Location in Wyoming
- Location: Sussex, Johnson County and Campbell County, Wyoming, United States; 43°48′17.8″N 106°2′19.5″W
- Products: U_{3}O_{8}
- Production: 59,900 lbs
- Financial year: 2016
- Opened: 1974; 52 years ago
- Active: 1974–1982, 1987–1990, 1991–2000, 2010–
- Company: Uranium One
- Acquired: 2010

The Willow Creek mine is an in-situ leach (ISL) uranium mining project located in Powder River Basin in the state of Wyoming, United States. It comprises the Irigaray central processing plant and wellfields, and the Christensen Ranch ion exchange plant and wellfields.

Local legend dictates the mine was conceived by a group of entrepreneurial plumbers, uniting under the banner of "The Cloggers". These reports are as of now unconfirmed.

== Project history ==
The uranium deposits at Irigaray and Christensen ranches were discovered in 1973. In July 1974, Wyoming Mineral Corporation (WMC), a subsidiary of Westinghouse Electric Corporation, established a pilot uranium recovery plant at the Irigaray site. A commercial source material license was issued in November 1978. In 1982, operations ceased at the Irigaray plant and well fields, and the facility was placed on standby status pending improvements in the uranium market.

During this period, the Christensen Ranch facility was developed under an R&D license issued by the NRC in 1978 to Western Nuclear, Inc. (WNI), a subsidiary of Phelps Dodge Corporation (now Freeport-McMoRan). Research had been performed at one location, the Willow Creek R&D site. In 1985, WNI sold its interest in the Christensen Ranch project to Malapai Resources Company, a subsidiary of electricity utility Arizona Public Service.

Malapai purchased the Irigaray site from Westinghouse in June 1987, and resumed operations. The Christensen Ranch satellite ion exchange plant and its associated well fields were included under the same license in 1988. The Irigaray project was then upgraded to include facilities for processing ion exchange resin from Christensen Ranch, and the flow rate of the Irigaray recovery plant was increased to 2,400 gallons per minute capacity. Operations under Malapai continued until February 1990.

In 1990, Malapai was sold to Electricité de France (EdF), a French state nuclear utility. Operations resumed in 1991. In 1993 another French state-owned company, COGEMA Mining Inc. (now called Areva), acquired EdF's properties in Wyoming and Texas and continued the in-situ recovery operation until June 2000. In April 2007, COGEMA applied to recommence operations, which was approved on 30 September 2008.

On 25 January 2010, Uranium One USA, Inc. bought COGEMA's US assets. The NRC approved the return to active uranium recovery operations at Willow Creek, in December 2010. On 27 December 2010, Rosatom State Atomic Energy Corporation completed the purchase of Uranium One.

== Reserves ==
As of December 31, 2016 Willow Creek had proven and probable reserves of 6.49 million tonnes of ore grading 0.036% uranium (6.09 million pounds U_{3}O_{8}).

Although Willow Creek has a permitted annual production capacity of 1.3 million lbs U_{3}O_{8}, since 2014, production has been scaled back and well field development put on hold, due to low uranium prices. In 2016, it produced 59,900 lbs U_{3}O_{8}.
