= Fanya Metal Exchange =

2011 scam

The Fanya Metal Exchange fraud was a notorious financial scam in China (also known as China's Ponzi Scheme) that was operational from 2011 to 2015. The collapse of the exchange sparked a series of nationwide protests against the involvement of Chinese local governments in supporting fraudulent fundraising schemes.

The exchange was established in 2011 as a global trading platform for rare metals and promoted by Yunnan government officials. It advertised returns as high as 13.7% and zero risk for investors. In the three years after it was set up, the exchange raised up to $6.4 billion from 220,000 investors across the country.

In 2015, the exchange blocked the withdrawal of funds and froze its accounts, triggering large-scale protests by defrauded creditors in Shanghai, Beijing and other major cities. Victims gathered outside the China Securities Regulatory Commission (CSRC) to accuse the Fanya exchange and CSRC government officials of supporting financial fraud. Twenty-one Yunnan executives, including the founder, Shan Jiuliang, were charged with embezzlement and of sabotaging financial markets in the Kunming Intermediate People's Court in 2018. The company was fined 1 billion yuan ($149.04 million) for illegal fundraising, and Shan was sentenced to 18 years in jail.

== Background ==
The Fanya Metal Exchange was a state-backed exchange that claimed to be the world's largest trading platform of rare metals, located in Kunming, Yunnan Province. The exchange focused on metals used in technologies promoted in the official Chinese strategic plan, including liquid crystal display (LCD) screens and solar panels. Its goal was to emulate the success of the London Metal Exchange and create an exchange dedicated solely to trading rare earths and other minor metals. It dealt in 14 rare nonferrous metals including indium, bismuth, antimony, and terbium, purchasing and storing them for resale. The exchange promised investors a fixed return of up to 13.7% per annum with the right to withdraw the principal at any time without penalty.

At its launch, Fanya was designated a "cooperation enterprise" of the National Bureau of Statistics of China. It was advertised on television as a government-endorsed and regulated safe investment product. A key product called "ri jin bao" (daily golden jewel) collected investors' money to be loaned to a third-party agency and invested in other rare metal products. The company's brochures claimed that major state-owned banks served as custodians for these investments. Because of ri jin bao's high returns and seemingly low risks, it rapidly became popular especially among middle-class investors.

== Business model and collapse ==
The exchange announced early on that it held the world's largest stores of bismuth, iridium, and rare earth metals. However, demand for these metals is low, making the funds invested in the stores illiquid. For example, by 2014 the exchange held more than 3,400 tonnes of indium and 19,000 tonnes of bismuth, in each case enough to meet global annual demand for several years. Since only small amounts of the stockpiles could be sold in a short period, Fanya would inevitably face a liquidity crisis if any sizeable request for cash withdrawal was made. In addition, the promise of a 13.7% interest rate could only be met with rapidly increasing rare metal prices. The exchange inevitably started to cover the interest and principal owed to existing investors using funds from new investors, the definition of a Ponzi scheme. When global rare metal prices declined the exchange started to collapse.

In April 2015, Fanya stopped withdrawals and froze assets nominally worth approximately 43 billion yuan ($6.7 billion) belonging to 220,000 creditors across the country. In July 2015 all assets were frozen. A complaint filed with the Yunnan financial authorities was rebuffed. In late 2015, the exchange ceased operations.

== Aftermath ==
The collapse of the Fanya Metal Exchange sparked months of nationwide protests, including protests in front of the Beijing and Shanghai offices of the CSRC that accused the regulator of "ignoring Fanya fraud". Hundreds of furious investors gathered outside the exchange in Kunming.

On July 15, 2015, Fanya announced that it would buy back 5 billion yuan's worth of metals from investors with funds from its partners.

On September 24, 2015, the exchange claimed that its liquidity problem was due to fluctuations in stock and commodity markets, as well as regulatory changes. It also attempted to blame the media for spreading "malicious rumors" and "deliberately inciting panic" in investors. The exchange proposed to sell its stocks of 6 rare metals and undergo extensive debt restructuring to resolve the crisis.

In October 2015 it was revealed that the "ri jin bao" financing scheme was never approved by the government. Fanya issued a statement claiming that ri jin bao was merely an internally circulated sales strategy.

Late in 2015 the exchange ceased operations and its building was taken over by "dozens" of investigators, following months of protests by investors outside government buildings in Kunming, Shanghai and Beijing. Early in 2016 Shan was arrested with 15 other suspects, and in March 2016 Kunming police announced that they had determined that the exchange acted illegally in its use of investors' funds. Investigators blamed regulatory failures for allowing the exchange to operate without proper supervision, but local authorities insisted they had done their job well. In June 2016 police announced that they had impounded more than 70,000 tonnes of rare metals and other assets of the exchange.

In August 2016, after a 7-month long investigation, the Kunming government announced 21 Fanya executives would be prosecuted for "illegal fundraising". Investors continued to seek to increase the visibility of the case, crowdfunding funds to support civil prosecution. A group of Fanya investors sent an open letter with 300 signatures and fingerprints to Cao Jianming, China's top prosecutor. Fanya investors organized to break out from behind the "Great Firewall" to protest on Twitter and press for attention from foreign media.

In July 2018, 21 executives involved in the exchange were charged in the Kunming Intermediate People's Court with embezzlement and sabotaging financial markets. Investors were not allowed to attend the trial, and some investors were asked to leave town before the trial began. The company was fined 1 billion yuan ($149.04 million) for illegal fundraising, and Shan was sentenced to 18 years in jail for crimes including embezzlement. Shan was also fined 500,000 yuan and had 50 million yuan of his personal property confiscated. Other executives charged included Yang Guohong, the former vice president of the exchange, who was accused of illegally appropriating property.

The Kunming Intermediate People's Court began selling off Fanya's assets in 2019. After initially attracting no bids on Fanya's indium stockpile, the sellers were forced to lower prices to complete the sale. Vital Materials eventually purchased the indium.

== Analysis ==
=== Regulatory failings ===
Both the Kunming and the Yunnan local governments approved the establishment of the exchange in 2011, although they had no right to do so, in a bid to draw investment to the province. Experts have argued that unless China undertakes sweeping regulatory reform, scams of this type are almost certain to occur.

=== Allegations of corruption ===
Analysts have suggested that Fanya was designed to swindle investors from its inception. At the time of Shan's arrest, he was reported to have given investigators a list of 400 individuals and companies who had "borrowed" from Fanya's funds. Defrauded investors have alleged that these individuals include government officials or people with ties to the government, and that the list has disappeared. It has also been alleged that the investigation of Fanya's collapse was delayed because local government officials who were members of the ruling Chinese Communist Party were involved in a "Promotional Work Leadership Group" that popularized Fanya as an investment vehicle.

=== Protests ===
The scale and scope of protests against the government resulting from Fanya's collapse have been unusual, fueled both by the scale of the losses suffered by investors and by outrage at the apparent support of a financial scam by local governments. Protestors are consciously risking jail to draw attention to their losses, and thousands of petitioners have been detained by the Chinese government. Many of Fanya's creditors came from the well-educated middle class. They have used social media extensively to organize their protests, and have collaborated to break through China's "Great Firewall" to flood Twitter with protest messages. More than 300 Fanya investors have become active Twitter users.
