= Kharasan mine =

Uranium mine in South Kazakhstan, Kazakhstan

- Location within Kazakhstan
- Location: South Kazakhstan Region, Kazakhstan; 43.84°N 66.86°E
- Products: uranium

The Kharasan mine is a large in-situ leaching mine located in the southern part of Kazakhstan in South Kazakhstan Region. Kharasan represents one of the largest uranium reserves in Kazakhstan having estimated reserves of 59.3 million tonnes of ore grading 0.074% uranium.

== See also ==
- Uranium mining in Kazakhstan
