= Noble metal =

Metallic elements that are nearly chemically inert

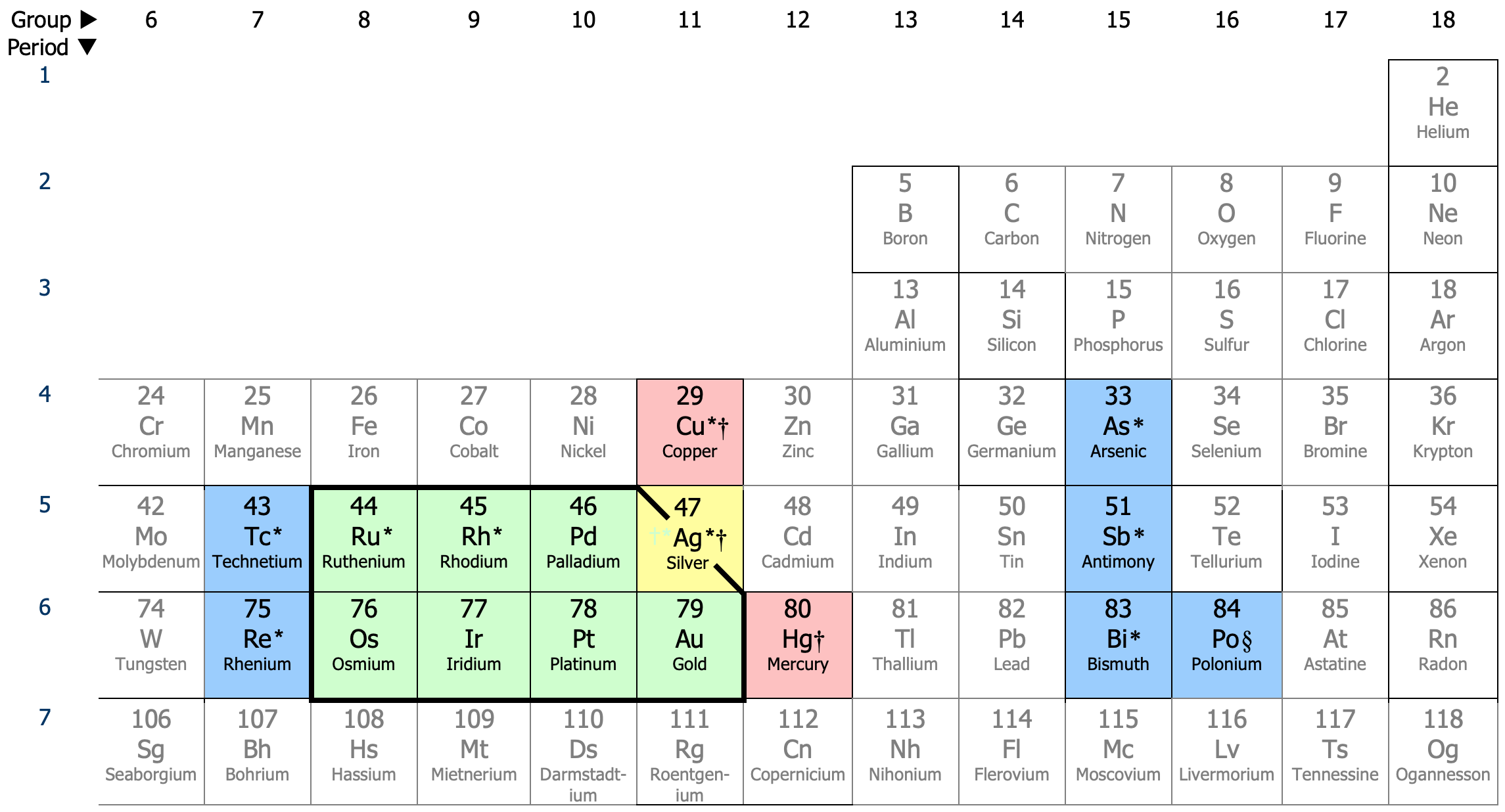
Periodic table extract showing approximately how often each element tends to be recognized as a noble metal: 7 most often (Ru, Rh, Pd, Os, Ir, Pt, Au) 1 often (Ag) 2 sometimes (Cu, Hg) 6 in a limited sense (Tc, Re, As, Sb, Bi, Po) The thick black line encloses the seven to eight metals most often to often so recognized. Silver is sometimes not recognized as a noble metal on account of its greater reactivity. * may be tarnished in moist air or corrode in an acidic solution containing oxygen and an oxidant † attacked by sulfur or hydrogen sulfide § self-attacked by radiation-generated ozone

A noble metal is a metallic chemical element that is resistant to corrosion and is usually found in nature in its raw form. Gold, platinum, and the other platinum group metals (ruthenium, rhodium, palladium, osmium, iridium) are most often so classified. Silver, copper, and mercury are sometimes included as noble metals, but each of these usually occurs in nature combined with sulfur.

In more specialized fields of study and applications, the number of elements counted as noble metals can vary. In some contexts, the term is used only for copper, silver, and gold which have filled d-bands. In others, it is applied more broadly to any metallic or semimetallic element that does not react with a weak acid and give off hydrogen gas in the process. This broader set includes copper, mercury, technetium, rhenium, arsenic, antimony, bismuth, polonium, gold, the six platinum group metals, and silver.

Many of the noble metals are used in alloys for jewelry or coinage. In dentistry, silver is not always considered a noble metal because it is subject to corrosion when present in the mouth. All the metals are important heterogeneous catalysts.

== Meaning and history ==
While lists of noble metals can differ, they tend to cluster around gold and the six platinum group metals: ruthenium, rhodium, palladium, osmium, iridium, and platinum.

In addition to this term's function as a compound noun, there are circumstances where noble is used as an adjective for the noun metal. A galvanic series is a hierarchy of metals (or other electrically conductive materials, including composites and semimetals) that runs from noble to active, and allows one to predict how materials will interact in the environment used to generate the series. In this sense of the word, graphite is more noble than silver and the relative nobility of many materials is highly dependent upon context, as for aluminium and stainless steel in conditions of varying pH.

The term noble metal can be traced back to at least the late 14th century and has slightly different meanings in different fields of study and application.

Prior to Mendeleev's publication in 1869 of the first (eventually) widely accepted periodic table, Odling published a table in 1864, in which the "noble metals" rhodium, ruthenium, palladium, platinum, iridium, and osmium were grouped together, adjacent to silver and gold.

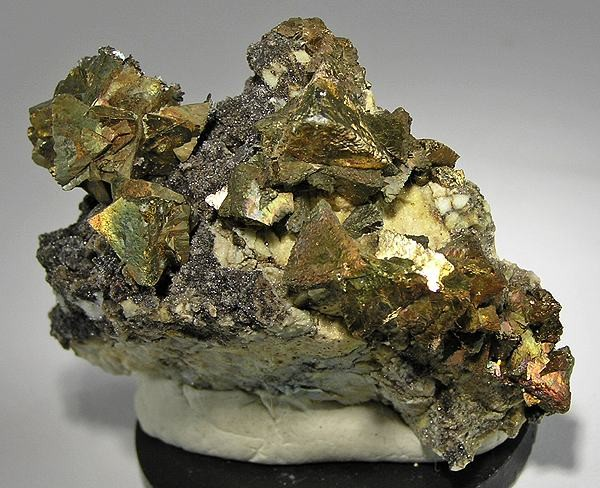
Chalcopyrite, which is copper iron sulfide (CuFeS_{2}), is the most abundant copper ore mineral

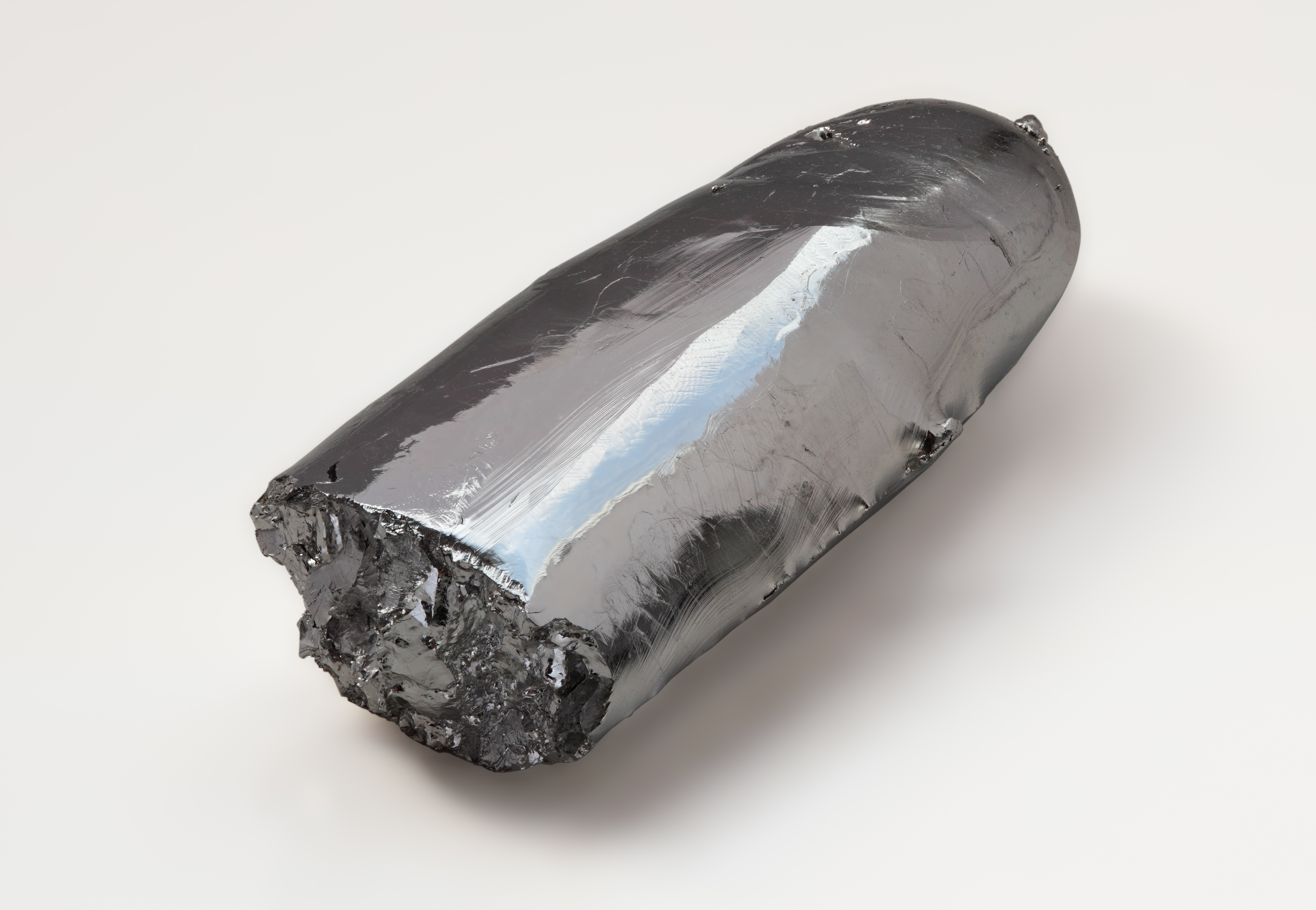
One half of a ruthenium bar.
Size ~ 40 × 15 × 10 mm
Weight ~44 g

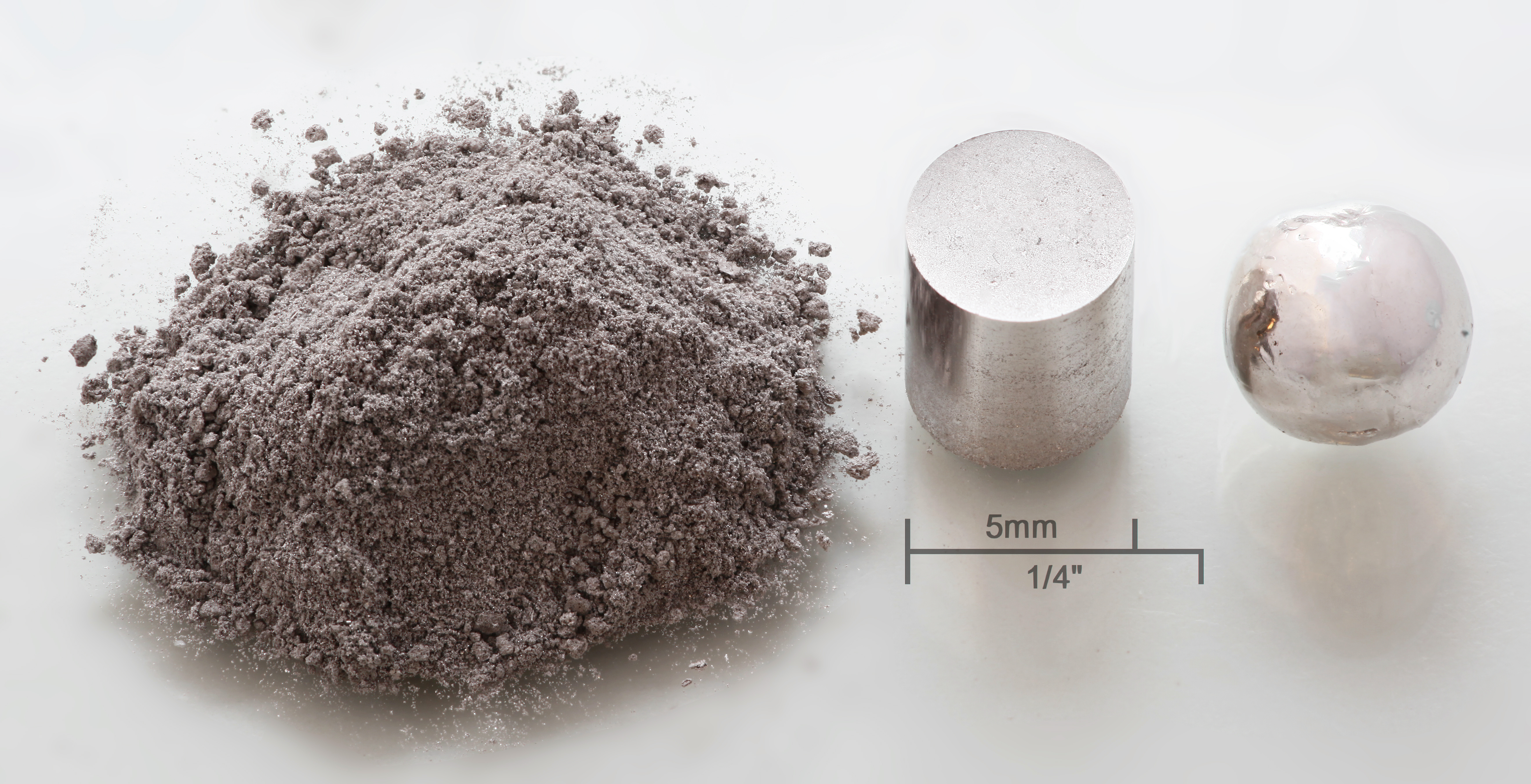
Rhodium: 1 g powder, 1g pressed cylinder, 1 g pellet.

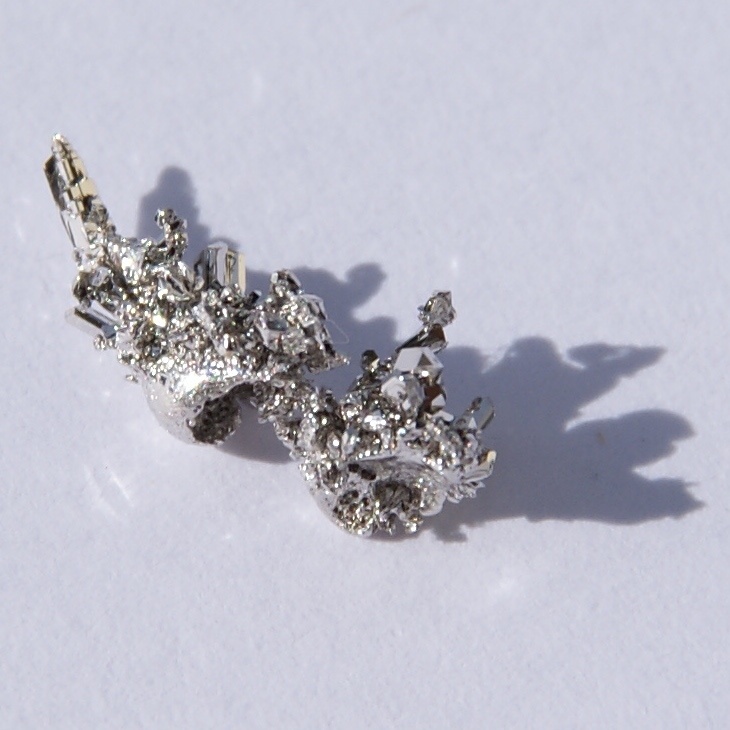
Palladium

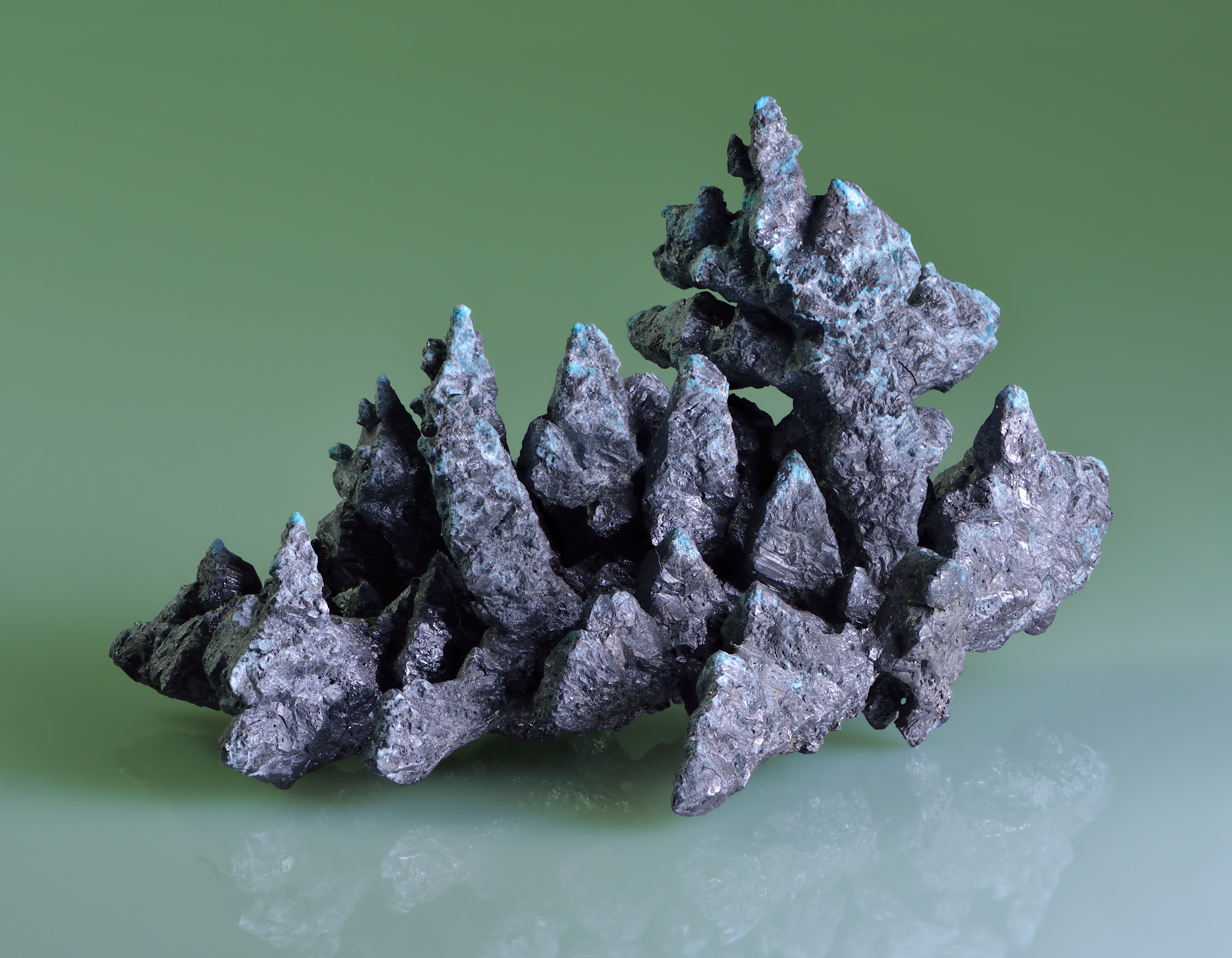
Acanthite, or silver sulfide (Ag_{2}S)

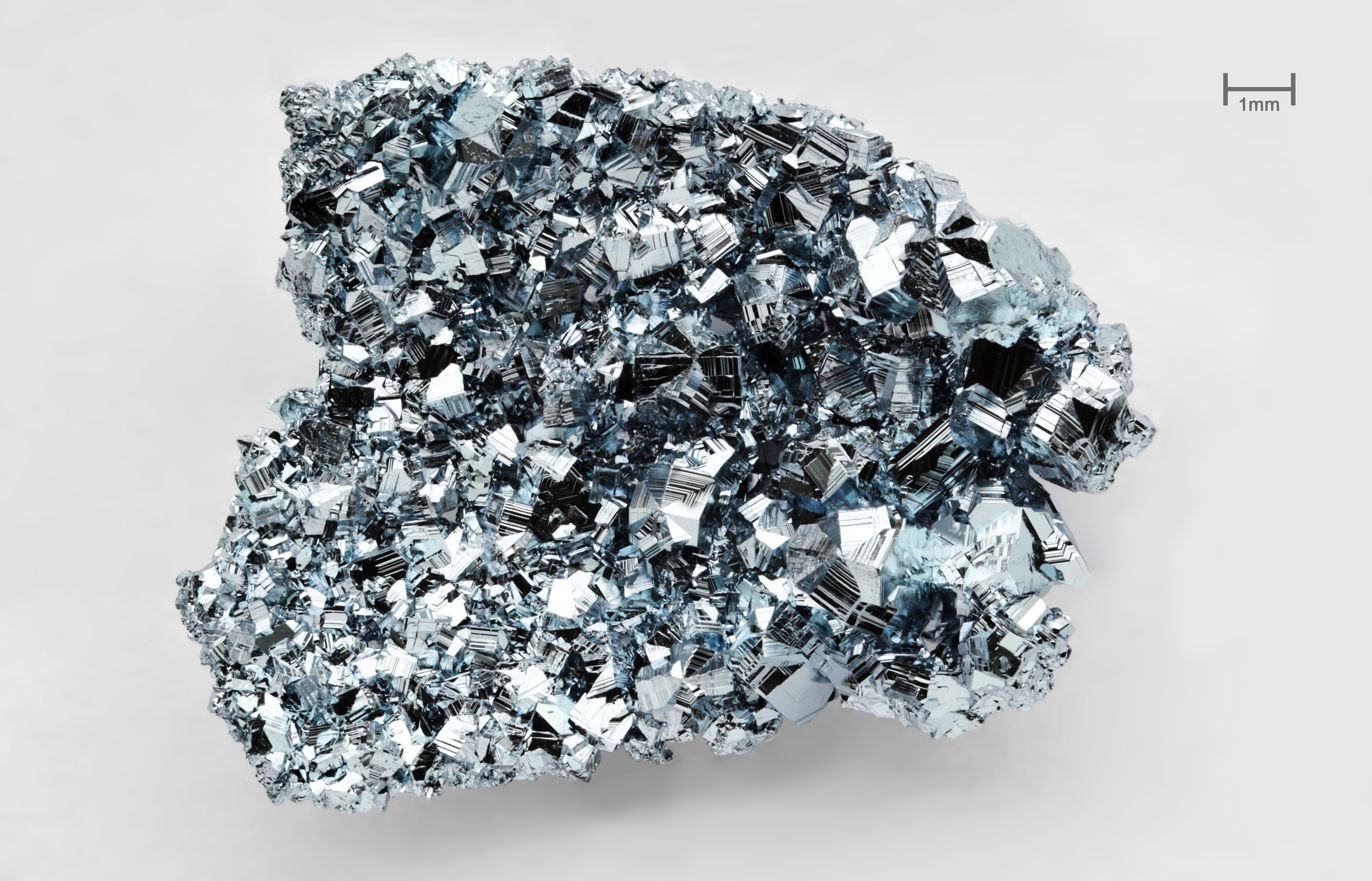
Osmium crystals, 2.2 g

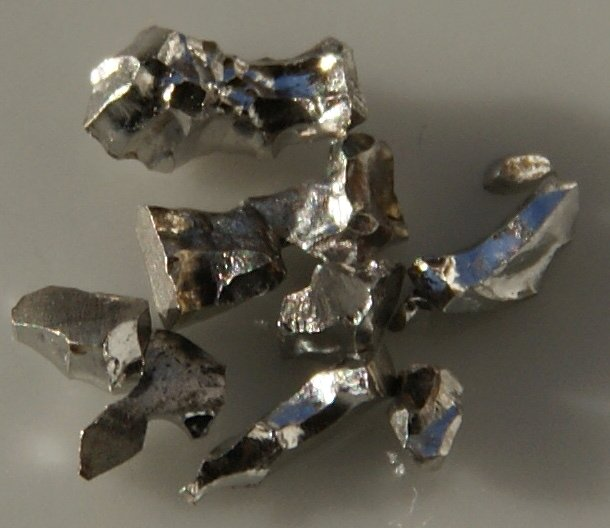
Pieces of pure iridium, 1 g, size: 1–3 mm each

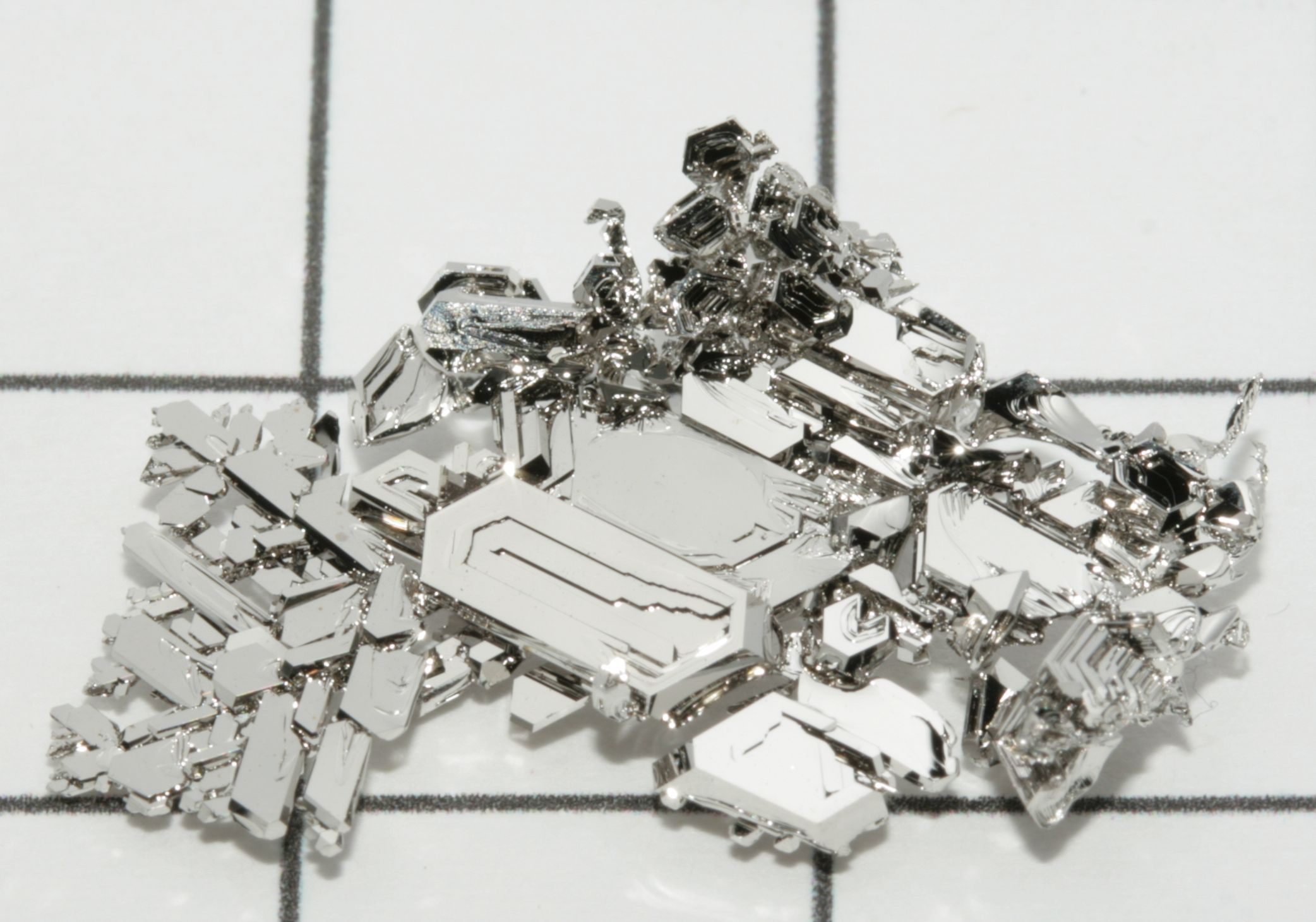
Crystals of pure platinum

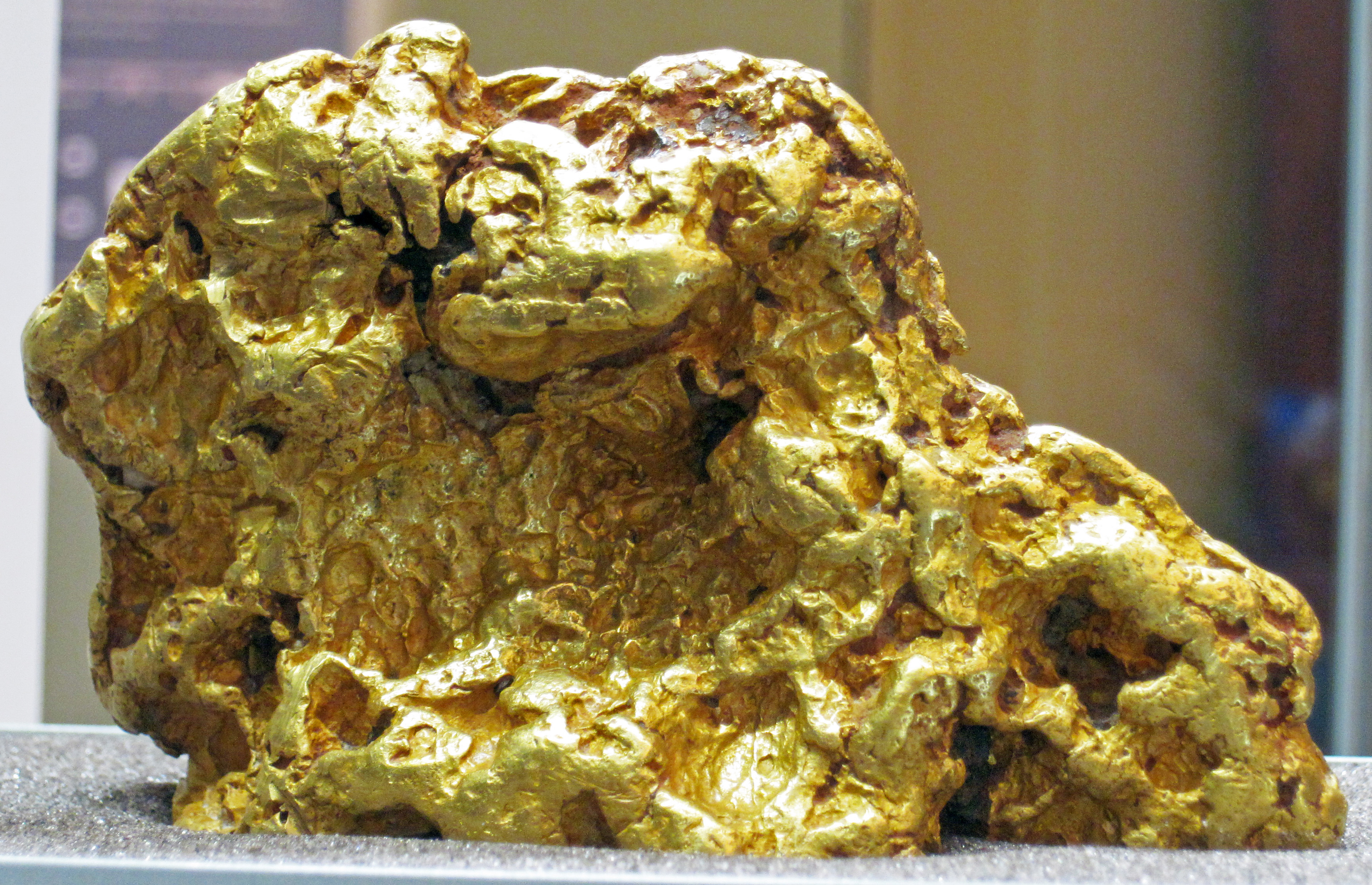
Gold nugget from Australia, nearly 9,000 g or 317 oz

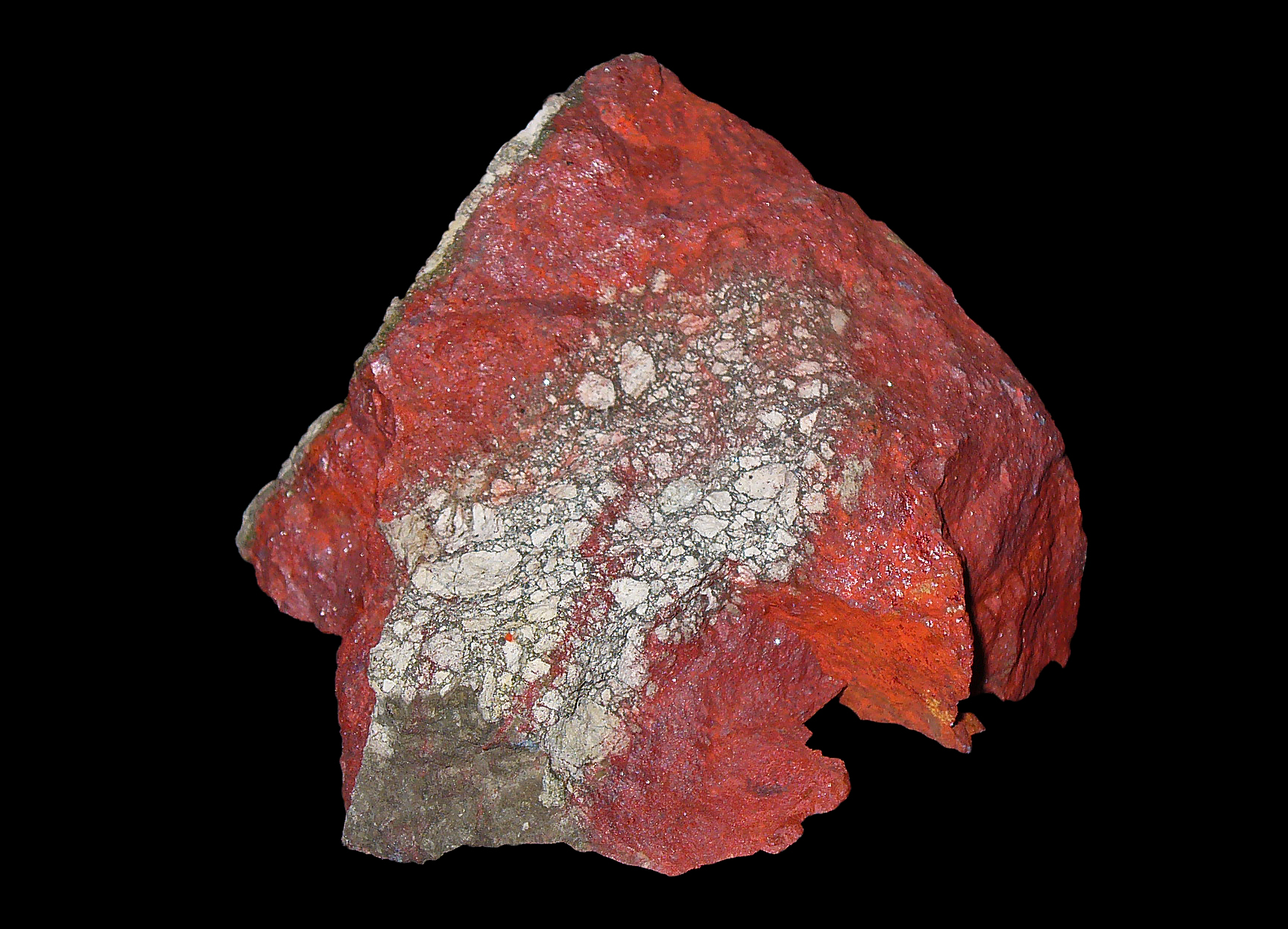
Cinnabar or mercury sulfide (HgS) is the most common source ore for refining elemental mercury

== Properties ==
Abundance of the chemical elements in the Earth's crust as a function of atomic number. The rarest elements (shown in yellow, including the noble metals) are not the heaviest, but are rather the siderophile (iron-loving) elements in the Goldschmidt classification of elements. These have been depleted by being relocated deeper into the Earth's core. Their abundance in meteoroid materials is relatively higher. Tellurium and selenium have been depleted from the crust due to formation of volatile hydrides.

=== Geochemical ===
The noble metals are siderophiles (iron-lovers). They tend to sink into the Earth's core because they dissolve readily in iron either as solid solutions or in the molten state. Most siderophile elements have practically no affinity whatsoever for oxygen: indeed, oxides of gold are thermodynamically unstable with respect to the elements.

Copper, silver, gold, and the six platinum group metals are the only native metals that occur naturally in relatively large amounts.

=== Corrosion resistance ===
Noble metals tend to be resistant to oxidation and other forms of corrosion, and this corrosion resistance is often considered to be a defining characteristic. Some exceptions are described below.

Copper is dissolved by nitric acid and aqueous potassium cyanide.

Ruthenium can be dissolved in aqua regia, a highly concentrated mixture of hydrochloric acid and nitric acid, only when in the presence of oxygen, while rhodium must be in a fine pulverized form. Palladium and silver are soluble in nitric acid, while silver's solubility in aqua regia is limited by the formation of silver chloride precipitate.

Rhenium reacts with oxidizing acids, and hydrogen peroxide, and is said to be tarnished by moist air. Osmium and iridium are chemically inert in ambient conditions. Platinum and gold can be dissolved in aqua regia. Mercury reacts with oxidising acids.

In 2010, US researchers discovered that an organic "aqua regia" in the form of a mixture of thionyl chloride SOCl_{2} and the organic solvent pyridine C_{5}H_{5}N achieved "high dissolution rates of noble metals under mild conditions, with the added benefit of being tunable to a specific metal" for example, gold but not palladium or platinum.

However, gold can be dissolved in selenic acid (H_{2}SeO_{4}).

=== Anion (-ide) formation ===
The noble elements gold and platinum also have a comparatively high electronegativity for a metallic element, thus allowing them to exist as single-metallic anions.

For example:

Cs + Au → CsAu

Caesium auride, a yellow crystalline salt with the Au^{−} ion. Platinum also exhibits similar properties with BaPt, BaPt_{2}, Cs_{2}Pt (barium and caesium platinides, which are reddish salts).

=== Electronic ===
The expression noble metal is sometimes confined to copper, silver, and gold since their full d-subshells can contribute to their noble character. There are also known to be significant contributions from how readily there is overlap of the d-electron states with the orbitals of other elements, particularly for gold. Relativistic contributions are also important, playing a role in the catalytic properties of gold.

The elements to the left of gold and silver have incompletely filled d-bands, which is believed to play a role in their catalytic properties. A common explanation is the d-band filling model of Hammer and Jens Nørskov, where the total d-bands are considered, not just the unoccupied states.

The low-energy plasmon properties are also of some importance, particularly those of silver and gold nanoparticles for surface-enhanced Raman spectroscopy, localized surface plasmons and other plasmonic properties.

=== Electrochemical ===
Standard reduction potentials in aqueous solution are also a useful way of predicting the non-aqueous chemistry of the metals involved. Thus, metals with high negative potentials, such as sodium, or potassium, will ignite in air, forming the respective oxides. These fires cannot be extinguished with water, which also react with the metals involved to give hydrogen, which is itself explosive. Noble metals, in contrast, are disinclined to react with oxygen and, for that reason (as well as their scarcity) have been valued for millennia, and used in jewellery and coins.

Electrochemical properties of some metals and metalloids
Element	Z	G	P	Reaction	SRP(V)	EN	EA
Gold ✣	79	11	6	Au^{3+} + 3 e^{−} ⇌ Au	1.5	2.54	223
Platinum ✣	78	10	6	Pt^{2+} + 2 e^{−} ⇌ Pt	1.2	2.28	205
Iridium ✣	77	9	6	Ir^{3+} + 3 e^{−} ⇌ Ir	1.16	2.2	151
Palladium ✣	46	10	5	Pd^{2+} + 2 e^{−} ⇌ Pd	0.915	2.2	54
Osmium ✣	76	8	6	OsO_{2} + 4 H^{+} + 4 e^{−} ⇌ Os + 2 H_{2}O	0.85	2.2	104
Mercury	80	12	6	Hg^{2+} + 2 e^{−} ⇌ Hg	0.85	2.0	−50
Rhodium ✣	45	9	5	Rh^{3+} + 3 e^{−} ⇌ Rh	0.8	2.28	110
Silver ✣	47	11	5	Ag^{+} + e^{−} ⇌ Ag	0.7993	1.93	126
Ruthenium ✣	44	8	5	Ru^{3+} + 3 e^{−} ⇌ Ru	0.6	2.2	101
Polonium ☢	84	16	6	Po^{2+} + 2 e^{−} ⇌ Po	0.6	2.0	136
Water				2 H_{2}O + 4 e^{−} + O_{2} ⇌ 4 OH^{−}	0.4		
Copper	29	11	4	Cu^{2+} + 2 e^{−} ⇌ Cu	0.339	2.0	119
Bismuth	83	15	6	Bi^{3+} + 3 e^{−} ⇌ Bi	0.308	2.02	91
Technetium ☢	43	7	6	TcO_{2} + 4 H^{+} + 4 e^{−} ⇌ Tc + 2 H_{2}O	0.28	1.9	53
Rhenium	75	7	6	ReO_{2} + 4 H^{+} + 4 e^{−} ⇌ Re + 2 H_{2}O	0.251	1.9	6
Arsenic^{MD}	33	15	4	As_{4}O_{6} + 12 H^{+} + 12 e^{−} ⇌ 4 As + 6 H_{2}O	0.24	2.18	78
Antimony^{MD}	51	15	5	Sb_{2}O_{3} + 6 H^{+} + 6 e^{−} ⇌ 2 Sb + 3 H_{2}O	0.147	2.05	101
Z atomic number; G group; P period; SRP standard reduction potential; EN electronegativity; EA electron affinity
✣ traditionally recognized as a noble metal; ^{MD} metalloid; ☢ radioactive

The adjacent table lists standard reduction potential in volts; electronegativity (revised Pauling); and electron affinity values (kJ/mol), for some metals and metalloids.

The simplified entries in the reaction column can be read in detail from the Pourbaix diagrams of the considered element in water. Noble metals have large positive potentials; elements not in this table have a negative standard potential or are not metals.

Electronegativity is included since it is reckoned to be, "a major driver of metal nobleness and reactivity".

The black tarnish commonly seen on silver arises from its sensitivity to sulfur containing gases such as hydrogen sulfide:

4 Ag + 2 H_{2}S + O_{2} → 2 Ag_{2}S + 2 H_{2}O

Rayner-Canham contends that, "silver is so much more chemically-reactive and has such a different chemistry, that it should not be considered as a 'noble metal'." In dentistry, silver is not regarded as a noble metal due to its tendency to corrode in the oral environment.

The relevance of the entry for water is addressed by Li et al. in the context of galvanic corrosion. Such a process will only occur when:

"(1) two metals which have different electrochemical potentials are...connected, (2) an aqueous phase with electrolyte exists, and (3) one of the two metals has...potential lower than the potential of the reaction (H_{2}O + 4 e^{−} + O_{2} ⇌ 4 OH^{−}) which is 0.4 V...The...metal with...a potential less than 0.4 V acts as an anode...loses electrons...and dissolves in the aqueous medium. The noble metal (with higher electrochemical potential) acts as a cathode and, under many conditions, the reaction on this electrode is generally H_{2}O + 4 e^{−} + O_{2} ⇌ 4 OH^{−})."

The superheavy elements from hassium (element 108) to livermorium (116) inclusive are expected to be "partially very noble metals"; chemical investigations of hassium has established that it behaves like its lighter congener osmium, and preliminary investigations of nihonium and flerovium have suggested but not definitively established noble behavior. Copernicium's behaviour seems to partly resemble both its lighter congener mercury and the noble gas radon. Moscovium has been also investigated to behave similarly to its lighter congener bismuth.

=== Oxides ===
Oxide melting points, °C
Element	I	II	III	IV	VI	VII	VIII
Copper	1232	1326					
Ruthenium				d1300			25
Rhodium			d1100	d1050			
Palladium		d750 (Note: Palladium oxide PdO can be reduced to palladium metal by exposing it to hydrogen in ambient conditions)					
Silver	d200	d100 (Note: Ag_{4}O_{4} is a mixed oxidation state compound silver in the oxidation state of +1 and +3.)					
Rhenium				d1000	d400	327	
Osmium				d500			40
Iridium				d1100			
Platinum				450			
Gold			d150				
Mercury		d500					
Strontium‡		2430					
Molybdenum‡					801		
Antimony^{MD}			655				
Lanthanum‡			2320				
Bismuth‡			817				
d = decomposes; ‡ = not a noble metal; ^{MD} = metalloid

As long ago as 1890, Hiorns observed as follows:

"Noble Metals. Gold, Platinum, Silver, and a few rare metals. The members of this class have little or no tendency to unite with oxygen in the free state, and when placed in water at a red heat do not alter its composition. The oxides are readily decomposed by heat in consequence of the feeble affinity between the metal and oxygen."

Smith, writing in 1946, continued the theme:

"There is no sharp dividing line [between 'noble metals' and 'base metals'] but perhaps the best definition of a noble metal is a metal whose oxide is easily decomposed at a temperature below a red heat." (Note: Incipient red heat corresponds to 525 °C)

"It follows from this that noble metals...have little attraction for oxygen and are consequently not oxidised or discoloured at moderate temperatures."

Such nobility is mainly associated with the relatively high electronegativity values of the noble metals, resulting in only weakly polar covalent bonding with oxygen. The table lists the melting points of the oxides of the noble metals, and for some of those of the non-noble metals, for the elements in their most stable oxidation states.

=== Catalytic properties ===
All the noble metals can act as catalysts. For example, platinum is used in catalytic converters, devices which convert toxic gases produced in car engines, such as the oxides of nitrogen, into non-polluting substances.

Gold has many industrial applications; it is used as a catalyst in hydrogenation and the water gas shift reaction.

== See also ==
- Galvanic series
- Minor metals
- Hallmark
- Precious metal
- Noble gas
