= Techsnabexport =

Russian uranium company

Techsnabexport (TENEX)
- Company type: Joint-stock company
- Founded: 1963
- Headquarters: Moscow, Russia
- Key people: Sergey Polgorodnik (Director General); Liudmila Zalimskaya (Chairman)
- Production output: Enriched uranium
- Services: Nuclear fuel cycle
- Revenue: 17.4 billion rubles (2019)
- Number of employees: 362 (2017)
- Parent: Rosatom
- Subsidiaries: SPb IZOTOP JSC; TENEX-Logistics JSC; LC NTC JSC; Crown LLC; INTERNEXCO GmbH; TENEX-Korea Co. TENEX-Japan Co. TRADEWILL LIMITED; TENAM Co.
- Website: tenex.ru

Techsnabexport (Russian: АО "Техснабэкспорт"), internationally known as TENEX, is an overseas trading company owned by Russian state-owned company Rosatom. Techsnabexport is an exporter of enriched uranium and a supplier of nuclear fuel cycle products.

== History ==
In 1949, a Soviet technology export enterprise Technoexport, under the Soviet Union's Foreign Trade Ministry, created a special working group to supply equipment to uranium mines in the Eastern Bloc. In 1952, the working group was used as a platform to create the Technical Supply Office of Technoexport, whose customers included the Soviet-German joint venture Wismuth in East Germany, the Jáchymov mines in Czechoslovakia, Quartzite in Romania, Kowarskie Kopalnie in Poland, and the Soviet-Bulgarian Mining Company. In 1955, Technoexport was reorganized and the Technical Supply Office was transferred to an export enterprise called Mashinoexport.

On 17 July 1963, Techsnabexport was established as an export and import bureau. It supplied equipment to uranium mining companies in Eastern Europe and managed clearing payments for uranium imports. The company was commissioned to export and import rare earth elements, rare and refractory metals, radioactive and stable isotopes, ionizing radiation sources, control and measuring equipment, and accelerator and X-ray equipment. In 1975, Techsnabexport was reorganized as an independent company. Its main activity was providing uranium enrichment services for foreign customers.

The first contract for the supply of uranium enrichment services was signed in May 1971 with the Atomic Energy Commission of France, launching Russian uranium products to European and global markets. In the 1970 and 1980s, contracts were signed with Italy, West Germany, Sweden, Spain, Finland, the United Kingdom, Belgium, and South Korea.

In 1988, Techsnabexport was transferred to the Soviet Union's Ministry of Medium Machine-Building (predecessor of Rosatom). In 2007, it was integrated with Atomenergoprom, 100% of shares of which belong to Rosatom. During the period of radical market reforms in the Russian nuclear industry between 2002 and 2007, TENEX acquired and consolidated assets in the uranium mining, engineering, and chemical sectors. Later, non-core assets were transferred to other subsidiaries of Rosatom, such as TVEL (acquired the Russian Gas Centrifuge holding), holding company Composite (acquired the research and manufacturing complex UMATEX Group), ARMZ Uranium Holding (acquired the Russia-based and foreign uranium mining assets), mechanical engineering and chemical sector companies.

In October 1992, the Russian Federal Agency on Atomic Energy and the United States Department of Commerce signed the Agreement Suspending the Anti-dumping Investigation on Uranium from the Russian Federation (Suspension Agreement). By the terms of the agreement, the investigation that was initiated in 1990s by the US natural uranium producers was frozen. The suspension agreement terms allowed for carrying out commercial supplies of negligible volumes of enriched uranium within the agreed quotas through 2002. In 1994, TENEX signed a contract with United States Enrichment Corporation to provide supplies of LEU downblended from 500 tons of highly enriched uranium extracted from Russian nuclear weapons to the US until the end of 2013. In 2008, Rosatom and the US Department of Commerce signed an amendment to the suspension agreement concerning uranium supplies from Russia, which was developed upon the initiative and with the participation of TENEX. It established necessary legal conditions for Russian uranium products to commercially enter the US market that had been closed to it during the preceding decade.

In 2008, TENEX signed contracts with China National Nuclear Corporation to provide technical support in the construction of the fourth stage of the gas centrifuge plant in China, as well as for uranium enrichment services and supplies of enriched uranium product from 2010 to 2020. In 2012, TENEX signed a contract with Emirates Nuclear Energy Corporation on low-enrichment uranium supplies from 2015 to 2029 for the Barakah nuclear power plant.

Since 2016, TENEX has been cooperating with Japanese partners on recovery after the Fukushima Daiichi Nuclear Power Plant accident. After a competitive tender was carried out in 2017 by the Mitsubishi Research Institute, TENEX and FSUE RosRAO worked on the creation of a neutron detector to search and identify fuel debris fragments inside the reactor space.

In February 2017, TENEX was appointed the sole organization authorized to conclude foreign trade deals related to import to Russia of irradiated fuel assemblies from nuclear power reactors. In 2017, TENEX was authorized by Rosatom to move low-enriched uranium though the territory of the Russian Federation within the IAEA LEU Bank creation in Kazakhstan.

In February 2018, TENEX and FSUE RosRAO, the V. G. Khlopin Radium Institute and SSC RIAR, was chosen for a project to develop technologies for analyzing the ageing properties of fuel debris subsidized by the Japanese government. Companies will study the samples of corium and "lava" generated by the Chernobyl Nuclear Power Plant accident, and will manufacture model samples of Fukushima Daiichi NPP fuel debris to develop a prediction model for the changes of corium properties with the aim of using it for post-accident clean-up at Fukushima Daiichi NPP. In 2019, after completing research on predicting changes in corium properties during aging, TENEX was selected as the executor of the second project on this topic.

== Operations ==
TENEX develops and supplies SNF storage and transportation systems, supplies equipment for RW management, builds infrastructure facilities for SNF management at the customer's premises, and reprocesses uranium-containing materials. The company also provides transportation and logistics services, and is developing new lines of business.

In 2019, TENEX concluded 28 deals with eighteen customers from eight countries, including additions to the existing contracts. The value of the deals was about $3 billion.

=== Nuclear fuel cycle and uranium products ===
Techsnabexport supplies uranium products manufactured by Russian NFC enterprises: natural and enriched uranium, uranium conversion and enrichment services, as well as services in handling regenerated uranium and other uranium-containing materials of non-standard specifications. These products are used to produce fuel for nuclear power plants and research reactors.

TENEX provides a significant portion of the uranium enrichment services for reactors of foreign design.

The total volume of the portfolio of long-term orders is about US$16 billion.

Techsnabexport was appointed as the only organization authorized to conclude foreign trade transactions related to the import of irradiated fuel assemblies into Russia for reprocessing.

=== Other activities ===
TENEX is working to expand the product offering for companies that produce and use "green" energy. The first deliveries of wood pellets as biofuel to the global market were made in 2019. The approach to the handling of wood in the supply chain was confirmed by certification according to international standards FSС and SBP.

The company is evaluating lithium deposits for their subsequent development.

== See also ==
- Energy policy of Russia
- Nuclear power in Russia
- Rosatom
