= Inkai Uranium Project =

Inkai Project
- Location in Kazakhstan
- Location: Kazakhstan; 45°16′56″N 067°32′12″E
- Products: Uranium
- Discovered: 1976
- Opened: 2009
- Company: Cameco (40%) and KazAtomProm (60%)
- Website: www.cameco.com

Inkai is a uranium mine located in Kazakhstan. Commercial production commenced in 2009, with the main processing plant being commissioned in 2010.

Inkai is a roll-front uranium deposit discovered in 1976. Uranium will be recovered using in-situ leach (ISL) mining methods.

== Reserves ==
Inkai is the largest roll-front uranium deposit in Kazakhstan. It lies within the Chu-Sarysu Basin and extends in a sub-meridional direction for about 55 km, with an overall ore-bearing zone width of up to 17 km. Ore body thickness increases from northeast to southwest, ranging from 30 to 90 m. To the northeast, Inkai is separated from the Myngkuduk deposit by a gap in the mineralized zone, while its southern boundary with the Budyonovskoye deposit is located near the lower reaches of the Chu River.

The deposit was discovered in 1976. Preliminary exploration was carried out between 1979 and 1983, followed by the first stage of detailed exploration from 1984 to 1991. The site is divided into four sections based on exploration progress. Proven economic reserves at Section No. 1, as approved by the State Reserves Committee, amount to 42,849 tonnes of uranium, with recoverable reserves of 35,192 tonnes. Estimated reserves and resources at Sections No. 2 and No. 3 are no less than 200,000 tonnes.

The ore at Inkai consists of medium- to coarse-grained quartz-feldspar sands with low carbonate content. These sands are suitable for in-situ leaching of uranium using sulfuric acid.

As of December 31, 2013, proven and probable reserves are 59,689,700 tonnes at an average grade of 0.07% U_{3}O_{8}. (87.6 Million pounds)

== Mining and production ==
The deposit is operated by the joint venture Inkai (Inkai JV), established in March 1996. It owned by Cameco of Canada (60%) and the National Atomic Company Kazatomprom (40%). The joint venture holds a mining license for Section No. 1 and an exploration and subsequent mining license for Sections No. 2 and No. 3. Commercial production at Section No. 1 involved the construction of a central processing plant, two satellite plants, an initial wellfield, a camp, and various auxiliary facilities. Construction of the main complex near the village of Taikonyr began in 2005, and operations commenced in 2010. In 2018, majority control of the JV shifted to the Kazakh side, when Cameco transferred 20% of its share to Kazatomprom. The mining license can be extended until 2045. In 2021, Inkai produced 3,449 tonnes of uranium, and in 2022 the venture reported revenues of US$476.3 million and net profit of US$278.7 million.

Until Russia's invasion of Ukraine in 2022, Cameco shipped uranium by rail to the port of Saint Petersburg and then to its refinery in Blind River, Ontario. Following the outbreak of war, the company announced that, in order to comply with international sanctions, it planned to use the Trans-Caspian transport route, via the Caspian Sea, Azerbaijan, and Georgia.

=== Pause in production ===
On 2 January 2025, Cameco announced suspending uranium production at Inkai JV over what it called a "bureaucratic holdup". Their joint venture had not gotten an extension to submit its project paperwork following a delayed submission to Kazakhstan's energy ministry.

== See also ==
- Sandstone uranium deposits
