= Kazatomprom =

Uranium producer

NAC Kazatomprom JSC (Kazatomprom)
- Type: Public
- Traded as: LSE: KAP, Astana International Financial Centre (AIX)
- ISIN: US63253R2013
- Industry: Nuclear fuel cycle
- Founded: 1997
- Headquarters: Astana, Kazakhstan
- Key people: Meirzhan Yussupov (CEO)
- Products: Uranium and rare earth metals
- Revenue: ▲KZT 502.3 bln (2019)
- Operating income: ▲KZT 151.9 bln (2019)
- Net income: ▼KZT 213.8 bln (2019)
- Total assets: 3,821,881,937,000 Kazakhstani tenge (2024)
- Number of employees: Over 20,000
- Parent: Samruk-Kazyna (75% ownership)
- Website: www.kazatomprom.kz

National Atomic Company Kazatomprom Joint Stock Company (Kazatomprom; Kazakh: Қазатомөнеркәсіп, romanized: Qazatomónerkásip) is the world’s largest producer and seller of natural uranium, providing over 40% of global primary uranium supply in 2019 from its operations in Kazakhstan. Kazatomprom's uranium is used for the generation of nuclear power around the world.

Kazatomprom is Kazakhstan’s national operator for the export and import of uranium and its compounds, nuclear power plant fuel, special equipment and technologies. Its status as a national company provides certain advantages, including, among other things, obtaining subsoil use agreements (in-situ recovery mining licences) through direct negotiation with the Government of Kazakhstan.

All of the company's mines and subsidiary processing operations are located in the Republic of Kazakhstan.

The uranium is virtually all ultimately destined for export as Kazakhstan has not had an operational nuclear power plant since the shutdown of the Soviet-built BN-350 reactor in Aktau in 1992. There is some debate regarding future use of nuclear power in Kazakhstan, however.

== Development Strategy ==
In 2018, Kazatomprom adopted a Development Strategy for 2018–2028 based on the principles of sustainable development.

In the wake of the Russo-Ukrainian war, the EU has focused on Kazatomprom for its uranium supplies to replace those from Russia, given the firm is developing its own refinement facilities and new transportation routes avoiding Russian territory.

== History ==
=== Foundation ===
Under a decree of Nursultan Nazarbayev, the first President of the Republic of Kazakhstan, Kazatomprom was established in 1997 as the national operator for the import and export of uranium, rare metals, and nuclear fuel for nuclear power plants.

==== Privatization ====
After more than 20 years as a national company owned solely by Kazakhstan's National Wealth Fund, Samruk-Kazyna, Kazatomprom was taken public with an IPO in November 2018 that placed 15% of the company's outstanding shares in free float on the Astana International Exchange (AIX) and on the London Stock Exchange (LSE). With the IPO, Kazatomprom became the first portfolio company of Samruk-Kazyna JSC to have shares offered on the international capital market as part of the Comprehensive Privatization Plan for 2016-2020 announced by the Government of Kazakhstan. This program is aimed at generating a free and competitive economy in Kazakhstan, creating and developing national platforms for attracting international capital, stimulating private business initiatives, and creating a favorable business climate. To attain this objective, the stated goal of the Kazakh Government is to reduce the State’s substantial share in gross value added to GDP to 15% in the medium- and long-term, which is better aligned with OECD countries.

After Samruk-Kazyna sold an additional 3.8% of the company's outstanding share capital in September 2019, and another 6.2% sold in June 2020, Samruk-Kazyna JSC remains the majority shareholder holding 75% of the outstanding share capital of Kazatomprom, while 25% are in free circulation and held by minority shareholders from around the world. In July 2024, Kazatomprom announced that Samruk-Kazyna had decreased its shareholding from 75% to 62.99% and the Ministry of Finance now owned 12%.

=== Uranium mining ===
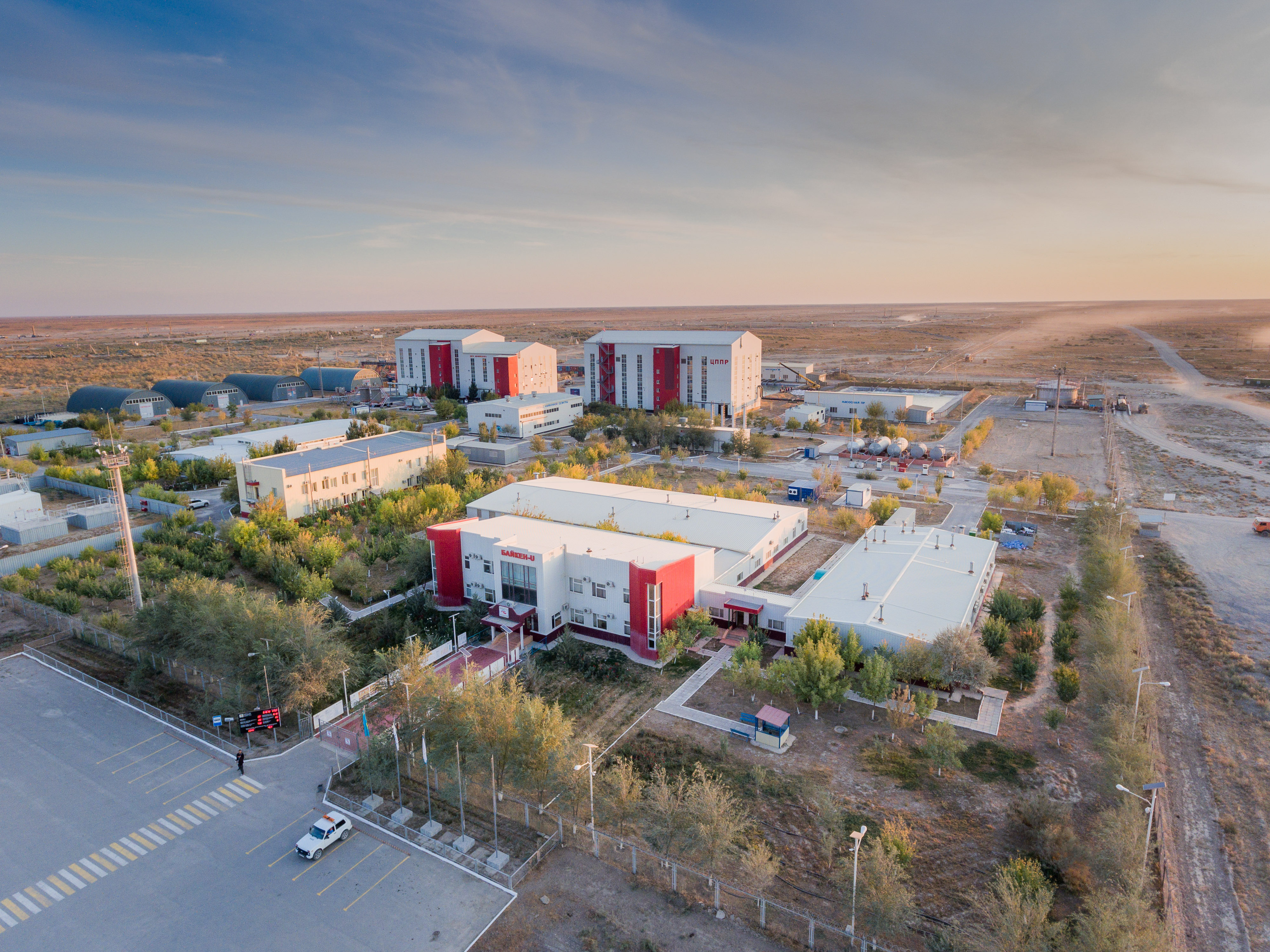
Baiken-U Mine Site, Kazakhstan

When Kazatomprom was founded in 1997, it was the 13th largest uranium producer in the world and by the early 2000s, the country had set a public objective to become the world's largest uranium producer by 2010. In 2009, production had reached 13,500 tU (~35 million lb U_{3}O_{8}), making Kazakhstan the world's largest producer and achieving its target a year ahead of schedule. Kazatomprom, as a national company with a proportionate share of production from all of Kazakhstan's various uranium operations, became the world's largest single uranium producer in 2010. Production continued to grow, reaching a peak of 24,586 tU (~63.9 million lb U_{3}O_{8}) in 2016.

The global uranium market entered a state of oversupply beginning in 2012, following a drop in demand that resulted from the 2011 Japanese earthquake and tsunami, which crippled the Fukushima Daiichi nuclear plant and led to the suspension of operations at all 54 of Japan's nuclear reactors. In 2017, recognizing the need for the world's largest primary uranium producer to take a leadership role in balancing global supply, Kazatomprom's management began to shift the company's strategy away from a focus on production volume, centering a new strategy on value and aligning production output with market demand.

By the time the company went public with an initial public offering in 2018, Kazatomprom had fully embraced a new value-driven strategy and refocused exclusively on its In-situ recovery (ISR) uranium production, the most profitable part of the nuclear fuel cycle. Under the strategy, for the period 2018-2020, production volumes were planned to be 20% lower than the volumes committed to under subsoil use contracts signed with the Kazakh government, at all of Kazatomprom's mines. Amid continued weak market conditions, the company subsequently extended its production reduction strategy through to 2022, after delivering on the commitment to reduce output by 20% against subsoil use contracts in its 2018 and 2019 results.

=== Nuclear fuel cycle integration ===
Throughout the 2000s and 2010s, Kazatomprom worked to expand its presence in the front-end nuclear fuel cycle, including agreements, joint ventures and projects in uranium conversion, enrichment, the production of UO_{2} powders and fuel pellets, and the production of finished fuel assemblies for nuclear power plants. Although the company retains a certain degree of vertical integration in order to meet the requirements of its customers, the focus has since moved to uranium mining.

Through its partnerships, Kazatomprom has gained access to refining and conversion technology. Although the company is not actively advancing any projects in these areas, it is prepared to expand into those segments of the fuel cycle, should the market signal that more refining and/or conversion capacity is needed.

In 2013, Kazatomprom, through the Kazakh-Russian joint venture Uranium Enrichment Center JSC, became a shareholder of Ural Electrochemical Plant JSC, the world's largest uranium enrichment plant. This cooperation in the peaceful use of nuclear energy enabled the company to gain access to uranium enrichment services. In 2020, following a strategic re-focusing on uranium mining, Kazatomprom sold its interest in the Uranium Enrichment Center JV to its partner, TVEL, while retaining access to enrichment services in Russia.

=== Low-enriched uranium (LEU) fuel bank ===
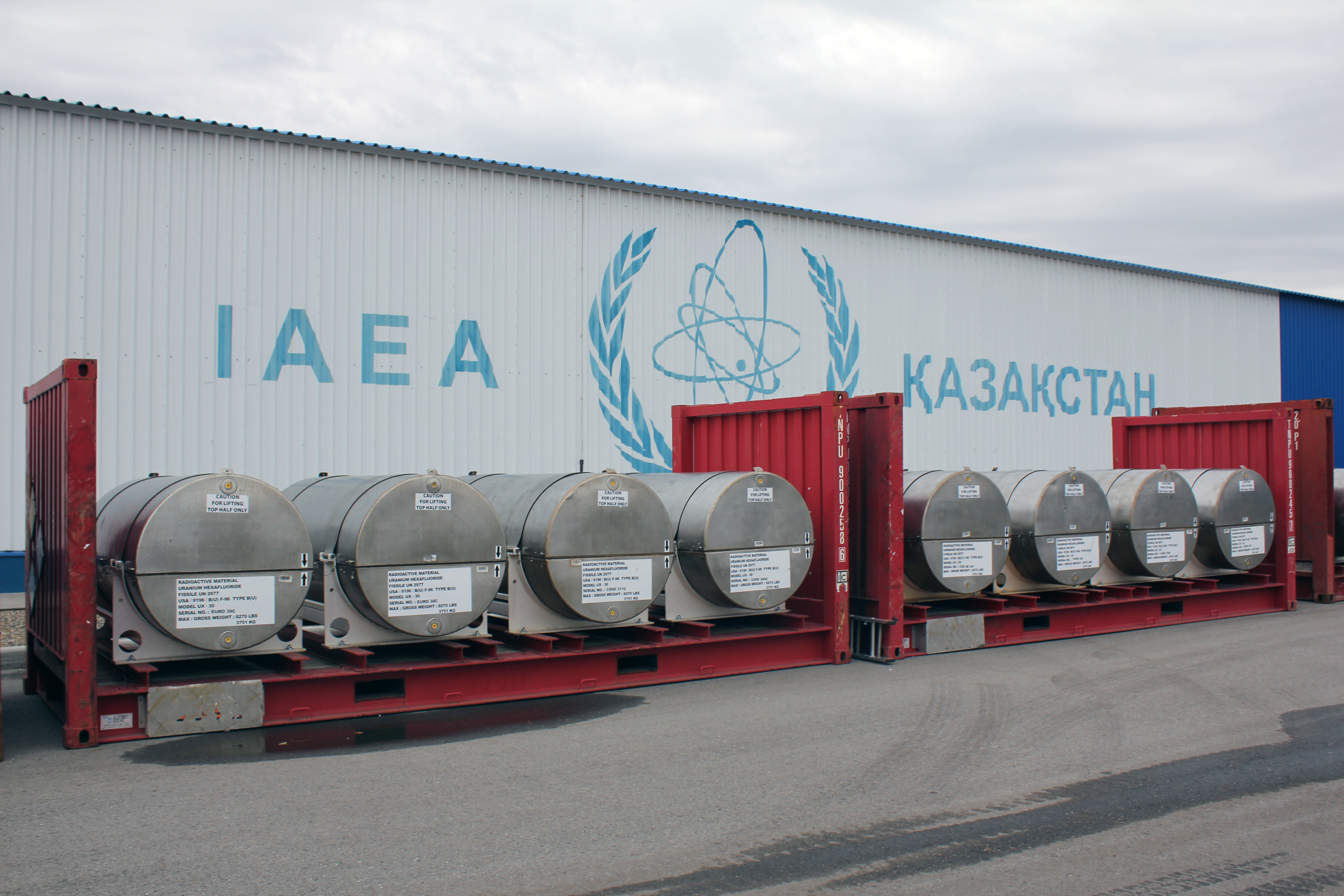
IAEA LEU Fuel Bank, East Kazakhstan

At Kazatomprom's Ulba Metallurgical Plant (UMP) in Oskemen, Kazakhstan, the International Atomic Energy Agency (IAEA) established a low-enriched uranium (LEU) Nuclear fuel bank, enabling IAEA member countries using nuclear energy for peaceful purposes, access to IAEA LEU reserves if uranium cannot be acquired in the commercial market. The LEU Bank, owned by the IAEA and located in Kazakhstan, holds a physical reserve of 90 metric tons of low-enriched UF_{6} delivered to the facility by Orano of France, and Kazatomprom.

== Business activities ==
=== Geological exploration ===
JSC "Volkovgeology", which is the successor of Volkovskaya geological expedition that opened the original Kordayskoye field, provides geological support for all activities of Kazatomprom and conducts technological drilling of mining and preparatory work on the uranium mining subsidiaries of the company.

==== Mineral assets ====
Kazakhstan has the largest uranium reserves in the world, with the first commercial deposit in the country (Kordayskoye) discovered and explored in 1951. With continued exploration through the late 1960s, uranium discoveries in the Shu-Sarysu and Ili provinces in southern Kazakhstan became the world's largest reserves of uranium. With these discoveries, Kazakhstan became the world leader in explored uranium reserves suitable in-situ recovery.

There are currently 56 identified deposits in the Republic of Kazakhstan that host reserves and resources in excess of 450,000 tonnes of uranium. Kazatomprom’s operations currently mine uranium from 14 of those deposits, of which one deposit has been fully depleted and is now in the decommissioning stage, while the remaining 13 deposits are being actively developed and mined. Those 13 active deposits are further subdivided into 24 areas grouped into the 13 uranium-mining subsidiaries with varying ownership structures. Four additional deposits are at the advanced exploration stage and the remaining 42 deposits are yet to be fully delineated.

Each of Kazakhstan's uranium deposits differ in terms of certain geological features, depth, and value. However, based on common geological settings, genetic traits, and territorial isolation, all are generally considered to be sandstone-hosted roll-front uranium deposits occurring in six provinces: Shu-Sarysu, Syrdariya, North Kazakhstan, the Caspian, Balkhash, Ili.

Over 65% of the world's proven uranium reserves that are suitable for ISR extraction are located in Kazakhstan, and all uranium resources developed by Kazatomprom will be recovered using the in-situ recovery method.

=== Uranium mining and processing ===
Uranium, which is abundant in the earth’s rocks and soil, is referred to as “natural” uranium when it is initially extracted, containing 0.7% uranium 235 (U235 isotope) and 99.3% uranium 238 (U238 isotope). Mining natural uranium is Kazatomprom's core business.

==== In-situ recovery mining ====
Using ISR technology, mining is carried out without blasting or sending people underground to bring the uranium ore to the surface. A low-pH production solution is pumped down “injection wells” into the ore body and as the production solution passes through the uranium-bearing rock layers (ore horizon), it dissolves natural uranium compounds. With the solution now containing the dissolved uranium, it is brought back to the surface through “production wells”. The solution is processed on surface using conventional processing techniques to extract the uranium, before being pumped back to the wellfields to extract more uranium.

Unlike the underground shaft mining or open-pit mining methods, the development of uranium deposits by ISR does not have a negative effect on the surface: there is no soil subsidence and disturbance, and no surface storage of low-grade ores or waste rocks. In addition, ISR in Kazakhstan does not require liquid waste or tailings management facilities. The major processing steps to extract the uranium take place deep underground (hence the term “in-situ”), resulting in lower production costs and an inherently higher level of health and safety performance due to lower mining risks. Upon depletion of the resource and completion of mining activities, Kazatomprom's remote mine site locations are restored to their pre-mining state, both above and below ground.

==== Uranium mining assets ====
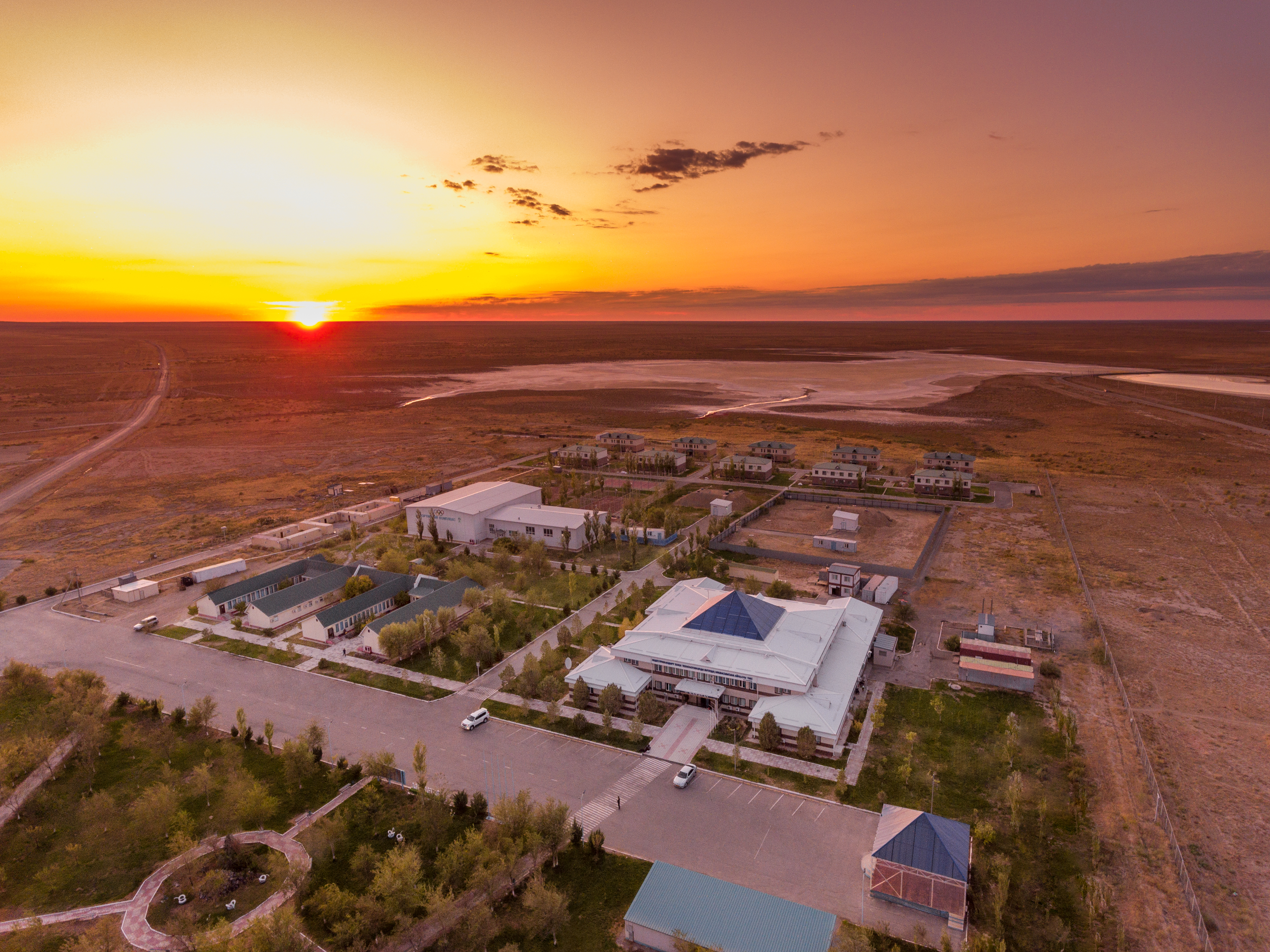
Kazatomprom's Karatau Mine, Kazakshtan

Kazatomprom operates through its subsidiaries, JVs and Associates, 24 deposit areas grouped into 13 asset clusters ("subsidiaries"), all of which are located in Kazakhstan and utilize the in-situ recovery (ISR) mining method. Benefits of ISR over conventional mining methods include lower cost of extraction, smaller environmental footprint and inherently better health and safety performance.

ISR uranium extraction was first used in 1960s and by 2017, its application was providing more than 50% of global uranium production. However, the ISR mining method can only be employed under specific geological conditions: a porous uranium ore horizon is required, through which the production solution can be pumped to dissolve the uranium, and dense, non-porous “confining” layers must be present above and below the ore horizon to ensure the production solution is well controlled between the injection and production wells.

All of Kazatomprom's production is carried out via ISR extraction. Eight of the ten largest ISR mines in the world are operated by Kazatomprom.

===== Mining subsidiaries (in order of 2019 production volume) =====
| Subsidiary | Deposit(s) | Discovered | Ownership | Partner(s) | JV Established | Contract Term | Region |
|---|---|---|---|---|---|---|---|
| JV KATCO LLP | Moinkum B1S, Moinkum B2 (Tortkuduk) | 1976 | 49% | Orano (France) | 1996 | 2000-2039 | Turkistan |
| JV INKAI LLP | Inkai B1 | 1976 | 60% | Cameco Corporation (Canada) | 1996 | 2000-2045 | Turkistan |
| KARATAU LLP | Budenovskoye B2 | 1979 | 50% | Uranium One (Russia) | 2005 | 2005-2040 | Turkistan |
| JV SMCC LLP | Akdala/Inkai B4 | 1972/1982 | 30% | Uranium One (Russia) | 2014 | 2001-2029 | Turkistan |
| JV KHORASAN-U LLP | North Kharasan - Kharasan | 1972 | 50% | Power Asia Group (Japan), China General Nuclear Power Group (China) | 2014 | 2005-2058 | Kyzylorda |
| ORTALYK LLP | Central Mynkuduk, Zhalpak | 1973 | 100% | - | 2011 | 2000-2033 | Turkistan |
| BAIKEN-U LLP | North Kharasan - Kharasan-2 | 1972 | 52.5% | Energy Asia Group - KAP, Sumitomo, KEPCO (Japan) | 2006 | 2006-2058 | Kyzylorda |
| JV AKBASTAU JSC | Budenovskoye B1, B3, B4 | 1976 | 50% | Uranium One (Russia) | 2006 | 2007-2038 | Turkistan |
| SAURAN LLP | Kanzhugan/Moinkum B1S, B3C/Uvanas/Mynkuduk | 1972/1976/1963/1973 | 100% | - | 2015 | 1996-2041 | Turkistan |
| SEMIZBAI-U LLP | Irkol/Semizbai | 1976/1973 | 51% | CGN (China) | 2006 | 2005-2030 | Kyzylorda/Akmola |
| RU-6 LLP | North/South Karamurun | 1979 | 100% | - | 1983 | 1996-2022 | Kyzylorda |
| APPAK LLP | West Mynkuduk | 1973 | 65.0% | Sumitomo, KEPCO (Japan) | 2005 | 2005-2035 | Turkistan |
| JV ZARECHNOYE JSC | Zarechnoye | 1977 | 49.98% | State Power Investment Corp. (China) | 2001 | 2002-2025 | Turkistan |

==== Uranium processing ====
Kazatomprom's Subsidiary, Ulba Metallurgical Plant JSC, provides services for final processing, reconversion, and production of fuel pellets for light water nuclear reactors, which it has done for nearly 40 years. The facility can process a wide range of uranium-containing materials for the production of ceramic-grade uranium dioxide powders with up to 5% enrichment (U235).

In addition to fuel pellets, Kazatomprom and China General Nuclear Power Corporation (CGNPC) in 2014 began jointly implementing a project to construct a fuel assembly production facility at Ulba, serving future Chinese needs for finished nuclear fuel assemblies. In 2021 Kazatomprom began production of fuel assemblies at the Ulba Fuel Assembly plant, and in 2025 reached the design capacity of producing 200 tons of low-enriched uranium in the form of fabricated fuel per year, sufficient to reload six reactors.

=== Rare metal production ===
Kazatomprom's Ulba Metallurgical Plant JSC is also involved in the production of certain rare metals, making the company among the world's largest producers of Tantalum, Niobium, and Beryllium. One of only three such enterprises in the world, the facility hosts a fully integrated beryllium production cycle and the only tantalum plant in the Commonwealth of Independent States.

Today, UMP ranks second in the world in the production of beryllium products, and fourth in the production of tantalum products.

=== Scientific research and development activity ===
Kazatomprom is engaged in research, design and development activities at its Research and Design Institute (IHT LLP) under which it centralizes the research and production subdivisions of its affiliated companies (Central Research and Development Laboratory under Ulba Metallurgical Plant JSC (UMP); Central Experimental and Methodological Expedition under Volkovgeology JSC).
