= ARMZ Uranium Holding =

Russian uranium producer

ARMZ Uranium Holding Co.
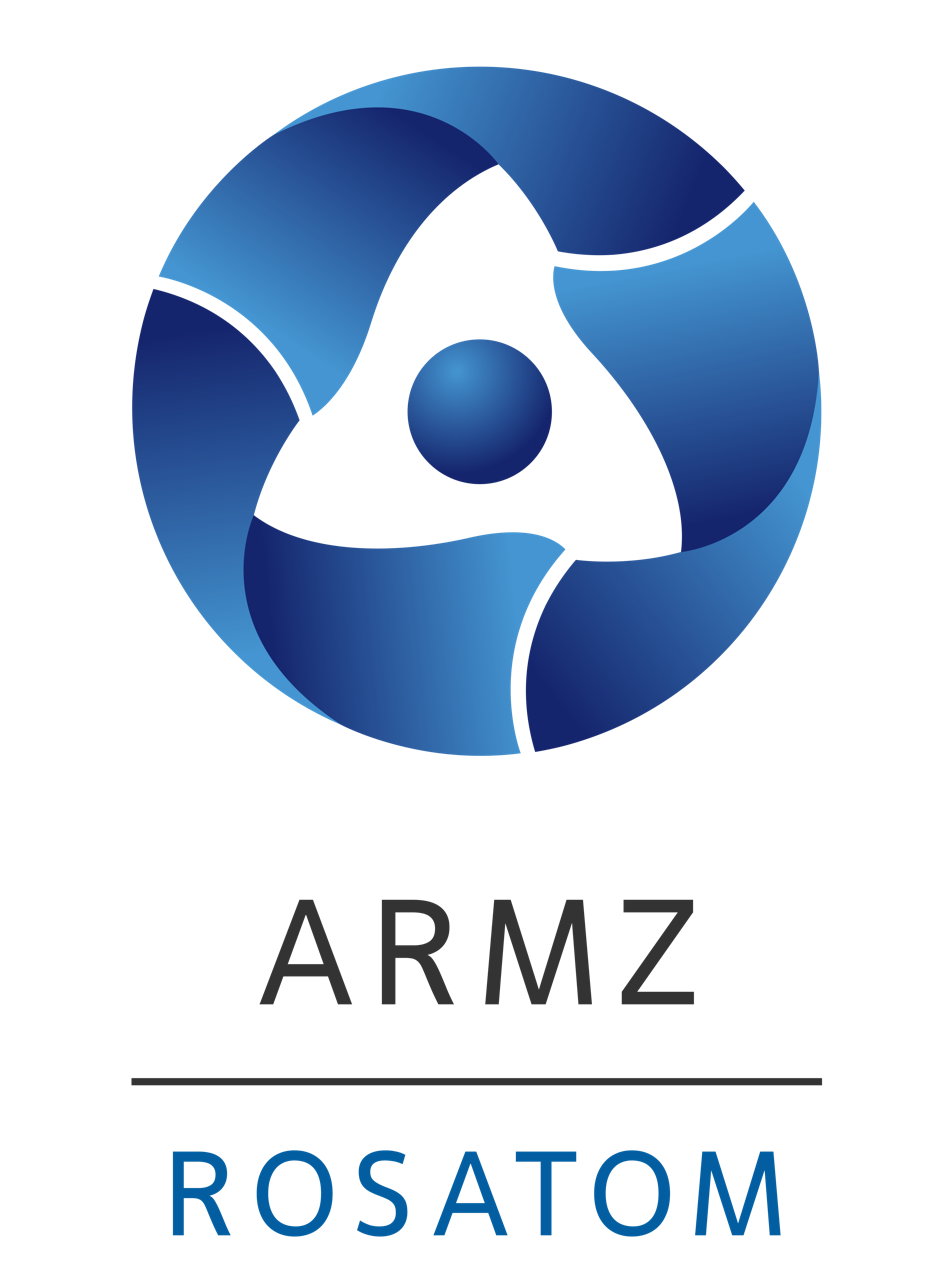
- Industry: Uranium mining
- Founded: 1991
- Headquarters: Moscow, Russia
- Key people: Alexander Lokshin (Chairman), Vladimir Verkhovtsev (Director General)
- Parent: Atomenergoprom
- Website: www.armz.ru

Atomredmetzoloto, JSC, (ARMZ Uranium Holding Co.), the Mining Division of Rosatom State Atomic Energy Corporation, is a Russian uranium producer internally ranked sixth in the world in terms of uranium production and second in terms of in-situ uranium reserves. ARMZ Uranium is the only uranium producer with operations inside Russia.

== History ==
ARMZ Uranium Holding Co. (Atomredmetzoloto, JSC) is a former state concern established in 1991, which evolved from the First Main Directorate of the USSR Ministry of Medium Machine-Building Industry. The concern was an industrial complex comprising mining and processing enterprises located in six countries of the Commonwealth of Independent States (i.e., Russia, Ukraine, Uzbekistan, Kazakhstan, Tajikistan, and Kyrgyzstan).

=== Early Days ===
The project for restructuring the nuclear industry resulted in the creation of Atomic Energy Power Corporation (Atomenergoprom, or AEP), a vertically integrated company encompassing enterprises of the civil nuclear industry. In early August 2007, Atomenergoprom acquired a 100% stake in Atomredmetzoloto, which became Russia's flagship uranium mining company.

The fundamental changes to restructure the nuclear industry were fraught with Atomenergoprom executed the consolidation of all uranium mining companies in Russia. To achieve its goals, Atomenergoprom transferred its shares in mining companies to ARMZ, i.e., 80.3% in Priargunsky Industrial Mining and Chemical Union (PIMCU), 97.85% in Dalur, and 99.99% in Khiagda. ARMZ took over Rusburmash, JSC in 200, and acquired a 100% stake in the authorized capital of VNIPIpromtechnologii, JSC in 2010.

In 2008, ARMZ announced a Russian-Armenian 50-50 joint venture to explore for uranium resources in Armenia's Syunik Province. However, according to the World Nuclear Association, the joint venture was a failure and was shut down in the middle of 2015.

=== Mergers and Acquisitions ===
In late 2010, Atomredmetzoloto acquired 51.4% of Uranium One (U1), a Canadian uranium mining company.

On December 15, ARMZ announced that it would buy Mantra Resources Limited, an Australian mining company, to ensure participation in the uranium development projects in Tanzania (including the Mkuju River area with over 39,000 tons of uranium reserves). In June 2011, it closed a transaction worth US$983 million to purchase a 100% stake in Mantra Resources. In January 2013, ARMZ agreed with the U1 management to increase its stake in Uranium One up to 100%.

In 2013, a spin-off of ARMZ's overseas assets was carried out to pass them under the management of Uranium One Holding, whereby ARMZ Uranium Holding Co. consolidated the uranium mining assets in Russia. In 2017, ARMZ suspended its Mkuju River uranium project due to low uranium prices.

== Ownership and Top Management ==
Atomenergoprom, JSC is the holder of 84.5% of Atomredmetzoloto, JSC shares.

Alexander Lokshin is the Chairman of the ARMZ Board of Directors.

In May 2013, the Board of Directors appointed Vladimir Verkhovtsev as General Director of ARMZ Uranium Holding Co.

== Operations ==
Atomredmetzoloto is engaged in exploration, mining, and processing of uranium and gold ores, rare and trace elements, while the uranium operations are run by its three existing enterprises (i.e., PIMCU, Dalur, and Khiagda).

Although ARMZ was a majority shareholder of the Canadian Uranium One, holding a 51% stake, in January 2013 it acquired the remaining shares in the company, thus becoming its sole owner.

Atomredmetzoloto also holds a 100% stake in Gornoe Uranium Mining Company (Chita, the Trans-Baikal Territory) and Elkon MMP, JSC (Aldan, the Republic of Sakha), a 99.78% stake in The First Ore Mining Company (TFOMC, Moscow), and a 50.003% stake in Lunnoye, JSC (the Lunnoye gold and uranium deposit, the Republic of Sakha).

In June 2019, ARMZ founded a new company — ARMZ Mining Machinery (Krasnokamensk, the Trans-Baikal Territory). Created under the business development strategy to diversify ARMZ's core businesses, ARMZ Mining Machinery in cooperation with Aramine headquartered in France produces high-tech mining machinery, such as load-haul-dump units.

Its other business diversification projects include ancillary mining operations to produce scandium (Dalur), gold and silver (the Lunnoye gold and uranium deposit).

On the Novaya Zemlya archipelago in the Arctic, preparations are underway for The First Ore Mining Company to start mining zinc and lead concentrates. During the field season of 2020, the international team was engaged to carry out Geological Prospecting activities which created a foundation for ARMZ to conduct an appraisal of mineral resources and reserves of the Pavlovskoye deposit in accordance with the JORC Code.

Drilling and geological monitoring operations for the projects are performed by Rusburmashр, JSC, both domestically and internationally.

== Performance Indicators ==
In 2020, ARMZ Uranium Holding Co. produced 2,846 tons of uranium at its Russian enterprises, thus ranking among the world's six top producers of uranium.

In total, the company employed 7,189 specialists in 2020, while its consolidated revenues amounted to RUB 20.4 billion.

== See also ==
- Energy policy of Russia
- Nuclear power in Russia
- Uranium One controversy
- Rosatom
