= Karatau mine =

Uranium mine in Kazakhstan

Coordinates: 44.3430°N 68.1490°E

- Interactive map of Karatau mine
- Location: South Kazakhstan Province, Kazakhstan
- Products: uranium

The Karatau mine is a large in-situ leaching mine located in the southern part of Kazakhstan in South Kazakhstan Province. Karatau represents one of the largest uranium reserves in Kazakhstan having estimated reserves of 70.4 million tonnes of ore grading 0.05% uranium.
