= Akdala mine =

In-situ leaching mine in Kazakhstan

- Location within Kazakhstan

Location
- Location: Almaty Province, Kazakhstan; 45.65°N 68.4°E

Production
- Products: uranium

The Akdala mine (Kazakh: Ақдала шахтасы, romanized: Aqdala şahtasy) is a large in-situ leaching mine located in the southern part of Kazakhstan in Almaty Province. Akdala represents one of the largest uranium reserves in Kazakhstan having estimated reserves of 43.5 million tonnes of ore grading 0.036% uranium.
