= Eric Sprott =

Canadian businessman

CM Eric Sprott
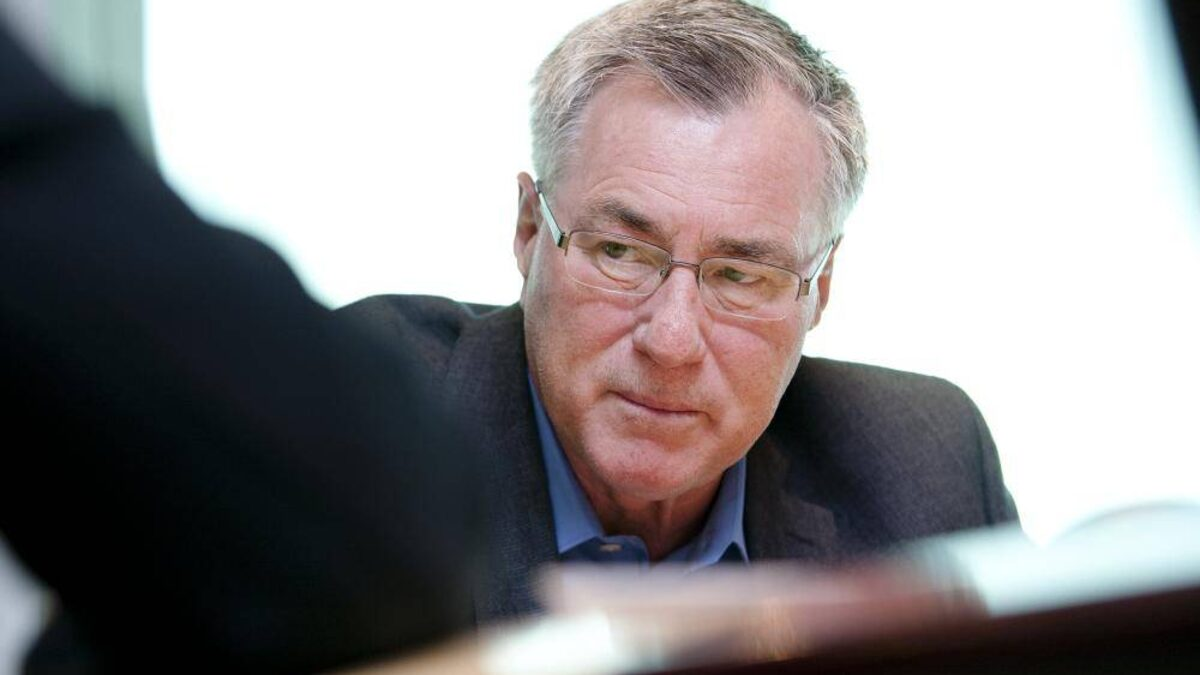
- Born: 1944 or 1945 (age 81–82)
- Education: Carleton University
- Occupations: Investor, Philanthropist
- Known for: Sprott School of Business
- Spouse: Vizma Sprott
- Children: 2

Eric Sprott (born 1944/45) is a Canadian investor and philanthropist. He is the founder of Sprott Securities and Sprott Asset Management, which later became Sprott Inc., a publicly traded asset management firm focused on precious metals and natural resource investments with approximately US$50 billion in assets under management.

Sprott is known for his investments in gold and mining companies and has been a prominent financier of junior mining firms. He has been referred to as the “Gold Bull” and described as a contrarian investor due to his long-standing advocacy for precious metals. His personal portfolio has been reported to hold approximately 90% of his liquid assets in gold, silver, and related mining equities. He is a Member of the Order of Canada and has been inducted into the Investment Industry Hall of Fame and the Canadian Mining Hall of Fame. His charitable contributions, primarily through the Sprott Foundation, exceed $337 million.

== Early life ==
Eric Sprott was born in Ottawa, Ontario, Canada, in 1944. He grew up in Canada's capital during the post-war economic boom, a period that shaped many of his early views on the nature of money and economic cycles. Sprott has described his upbringing as relatively modest, instilling in him a sense of frugality and skepticism toward financial excess that would later define his investment style.

Sprott attended Carleton University in Ottawa, where he pursued a Bachelor of Commerce, graduating in 1965. Carleton's business curriculum gave Sprott a grounding in accounting and financial analysis, and he went on to earn the designation of Chartered Accountant (CA). His alma mater would later honor him with an Honorary Doctorate in recognition of his extraordinary career achievements and philanthropic legacy. In 2001, following a donation of $10 million, Carleton renamed its business faculty the Sprott School of Business.

== Career ==
=== Merrill Lynch (1960s) ===
After qualifying as a chartered accountant, Sprott joined Merrill Lynch as a research analyst in 1968, focusing on securities analysis with a growing emphasis on natural resources and commodities. Around this period, he borrowed $50,000 from his girlfriend’s father to invest in the stock market, promising a 10 percent return within a year. The investment was successful and helped establish his early reputation as an investor. He left in 1970, subsequently joining Loewen Ondaatje McCutcheon, where he deepened his expertise in resource equities — particularly junior mining stocks then largely ignored by mainstream Bay Street analysts — before eventually striking out on his own.

=== Sprott Securities Inc. (1981-2002) ===
In 1981, Sprott founded Sprott Securities Inc., a Toronto-based brokerage focused on small-cap value equities and natural resource stocks that were often overlooked by larger firms. During the 1980s and 1990s, the firm became active in financing junior mining companies and resource exploration projects, bringing many early-stage gold, silver, and base-metal companies to institutional and retail investors. In 1997, Sprott also launched the Sprott Canadian Equity Fund.

In 2001 (with the transaction completed in 2002), Sprott sold Sprott Securities to its employees, after which the brokerage was renamed Cormark Securities Inc. Sprott and his partners retained the firm’s asset management business as a separate entity.

=== Sprott Asset Management LP (2001–present) ===
Sprott advised investors to buy gold before the 2008 financial crisis. After the 2008 financial crisis, gold rallied to a new all-time high of over $2000/oz.

The Sprott Molybdenum Participation Corporation was a dedicated commodity hedge fund created in April 2007 to invest in molybdenum assets. The primary investment objective of the corporation was to achieve capital appreciation by investing in securities of private and public companies that explore for, mine, and process molybdenum. The fund was listed on Toronto Stock Exchange under the ticker MLY.

He was the chairman of Sprott Inc, a Toronto-based asset management firm, from 2010 to May 2017.

Sprott is a "long-time gold bull", and claims to hold 90% of his assets (except for Sprott Inc shares) in gold and silver.

== Personal life ==
Sprott was married to Vizma Sprott and has two children, Juliana Haver and Larisa Sprott. Vizma Sprott died on February 11, 2025.
