= South Inkai mine =

Uranium mine in Kazakhstan

Coordinates: 45.1680°N 67.4950°E

- Interactive map of South Inkai mine
- Location: South Kazakhstan Province, Kazakhstan
- Products: uranium
- Company: 70% Uranium One - 30 % Kazatomprom

The South Inkai mine is a large in-situ leaching mine located in the southern part of Kazakhstan in South Kazakhstan Province. South Inkai represents one of the largest uranium reserves in Kazakhstan having estimated reserves of 135.4 million tonnes of ore grading 0.026% uranium.

Commercial production from the South Inkai uranium mine started in January 2009.
