= Akbastau mine =

Uranium mine in Kazakhstan

- Location within Kazakhstan
- Location: South Kazakhstan Province, Kazakhstan; 44°44′45.89″N 67°39′0″E
- Products: uranium

The Akbastau mine is a large in-situ leaching mine located in the southern part of Kazakhstan in South Kazakhstan Province. Akbastau represents one of the largest uranium reserves in Kazakhstan, having estimated reserves of 66 million tonnes of ore grading 0.077% uranium.

The mine started production at the end of 2009.
