= Atomenergoprom =

Russian nuclear company

- Native name: AO Атомэнергопром
- Company type: Public (AO)
- Industry: Nuclear power
- Founded: 2007
- Headquarters: Moscow, Russia
- Key people: Kirill Borisovich Komarov; Vladislav I. Korogodin
- Parent: Rosatom
- Website: www.atomenergoprom.ru/en/

Atomenergoprom (Atomic Energy Power Corporation, AEP, Russian: AO Атомэнергопром) is a 100% state-owned holding company that unifies the Russian civil nuclear industry. It is a part of the Rosatom state corporation.

== History ==
Atomenergoprom was created by a Presidential Decree signed by Vladimir Putin on 27 April 2007, following the adoption of a new law by the Russian Parliament on 19 January 2007, creating one of the world's largest nuclear companies. On 7 July 2007, the corporate charter and board of directors were approved.

== Organization ==
Atomenergoprom includes nuclear power plant operator Rosenergoatom, nuclear fuel producer and supplier TVEL, uranium trader Tekhsnabexport (Tenex), nuclear facilities constructor Atomenergomash, international nuclear construction and project management concern Atomstroyexport, and uranium mining company ARMZ Uranium Holding Co. (Atomredmetzoloto). Among the unitary enterprises corporatized in a transfer of shareholdings from the government to Atomenergoprom are Novosibirsk State Design Research Institute VNIPIET, Zarubezhatomenergostroy All-Russian Production Association (Moscow), Lenatomenergostroy Specialized Construction-Installation Department (Sosnovy Bor, Leningrad oblast), Nizhniy Novgorod Research and Development Institute Atomenergoproekt, the Atom-Service department of Energoatom, Atomtekhenergro (Mytischi, Moscow Region), the Research and Development Institute for Nuclear Machinery Construction (VNIAEM, Moscow), Isotop All-Region Association (Moscow) and Atomspetstrans of Rosatom (Moscow).

== Management ==
Sergei Kiriyenko, former Prime Minister of Russia and current head of the Rosatom State Corporation, serves as the chairman of the board of directors. Vladimir Travin, deputy head of Rosatom, serves as the director of the company; Sergey Obozov, former director general of Rosenergoatom, is the first deputy director; and Petr Schedrovitsky, former President of the Russian Institute of Nuclear Power Plant Operators, serves as the deputy director. Vladimir Smirnov, former director general of Tekhsnabexport is an adviser to the director. Igor Borovkov, Tatiana Elfimova and Ivan Kamenskikh, all of whom previously held senior positions at Rosatom, also serve as directors.

== See also ==
- Energy policy of Russia
- Nuclear power in Russia
