= Zarechnoye mine =

Uranium mine in Kazakhstan

- Location within Kazakhstan
- Location: South Kazakhstan Region, Kazakhstan; 42.28°N 68.01°E
- Products: Uranium

The Zarechnoye mine is a large in-situ leaching mine located in the southern part of Kazakhstan in South Kazakhstan Region. Zarechnoye represents one of the largest uranium reserves in Kazakhstan having estimated reserves of 90 million tonnes of ore grading 0.036% uranium.
