= Uranium mining =

Process of extraction of uranium ore from the ground

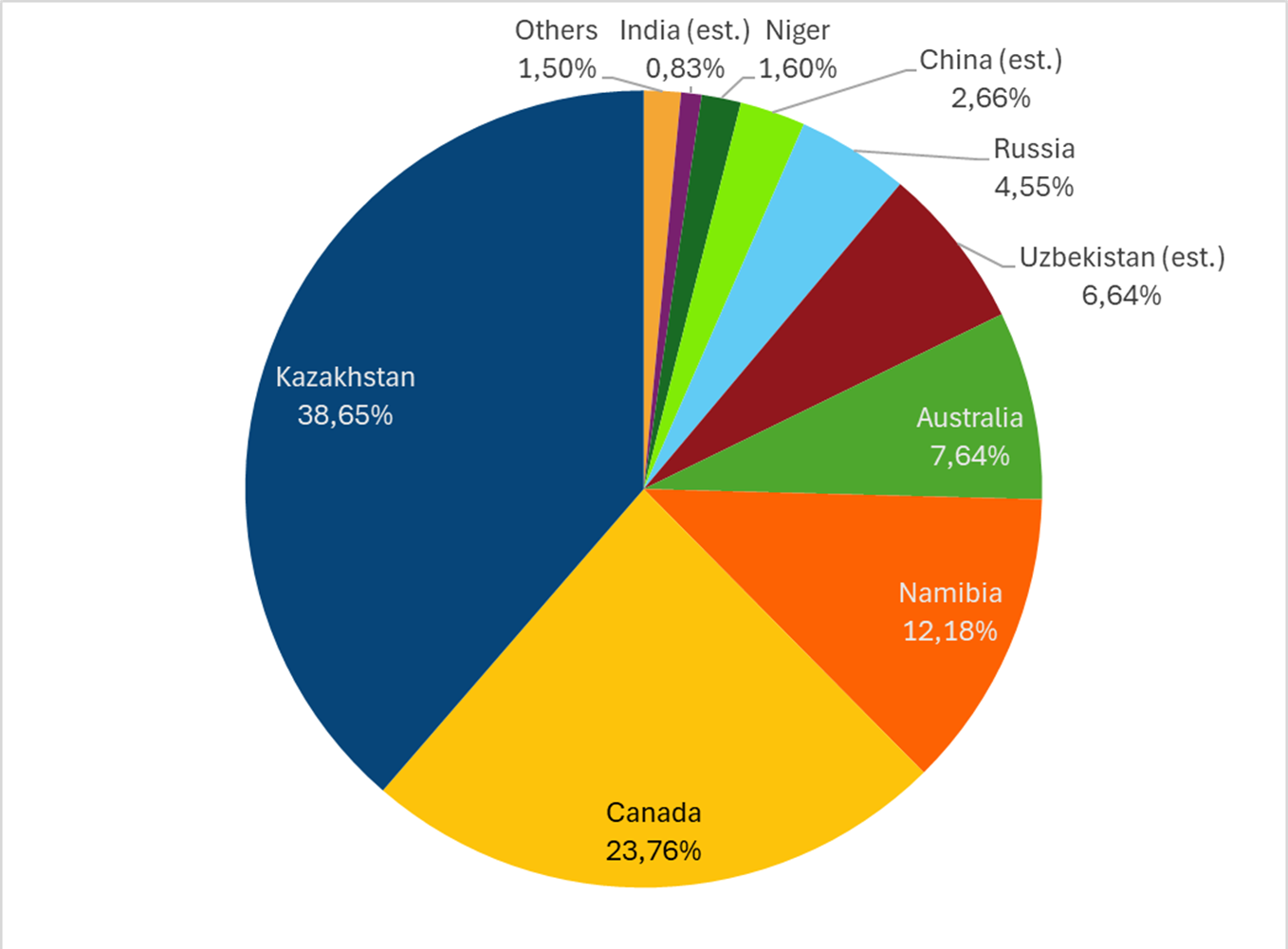
2024 uranium mining by nation

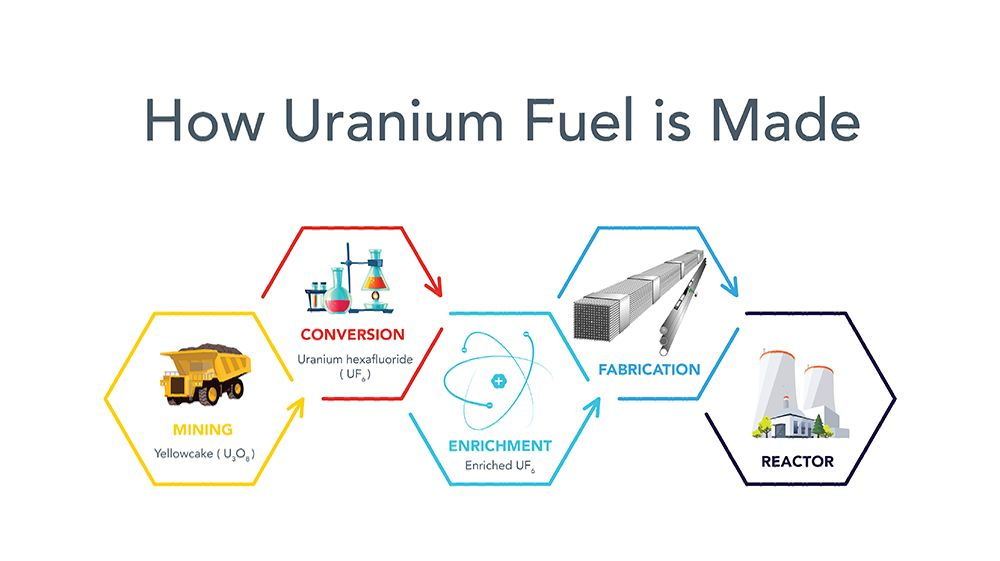
Schematic diagram of stages from uranium mining to energy production

Uranium mining is the process of extraction of uranium ore from the earth. Almost 50,000 tons of uranium were produced in 2022. Kazakhstan, Canada, and Namibia were the top three uranium producers, respectively, and together account for 69% of world production. Other countries producing more than 1,000 tons per year included Australia, Niger, Russia, Uzbekistan and China. Nearly all of the world's mined uranium is used to power nuclear power plants. Historically uranium was also used in applications such as uranium glass or ferrouranium but those applications have declined due to the radioactivity and toxicity of uranium and are nowadays mostly supplied with a plentiful cheap supply of depleted uranium which is also used in uranium ammunition. In addition to being cheaper, depleted uranium is also less radioactive due to a lower content of short-lived ^{234}U and ^{235}U than natural uranium.

Uranium is mined by in-situ leaching (57% of world production) or by conventional underground or open-pit mining of ores (43% of production). During in-situ mining, a leaching solution is pumped down drill holes into the uranium ore deposit where it dissolves the ore. The uranium-rich fluid is then pumped back to the surface, and the uranium compounds are extracted from solution. In conventional mining, ores are processed by grinding the ore materials to a uniform particle size and then treating the ore to extract the uranium by chemical leaching. The milling process commonly yields dry powder-form material consisting of natural uranium, "yellowcake", which is nowadays commonly sold on the uranium market as U_{3}O_{8}. While some nuclear power plants – most notably heavy water reactors like the CANDU – can operate with natural uranium (usually in the form of uranium dioxide), the vast majority of commercial nuclear power plants and many research reactors require uranium enrichment, which raises the content of ^{235}U from the natural 0.72% to 3–5% (for use in light water reactors) or even higher, depending on the application.

== History ==
=== Early uranium mining ===
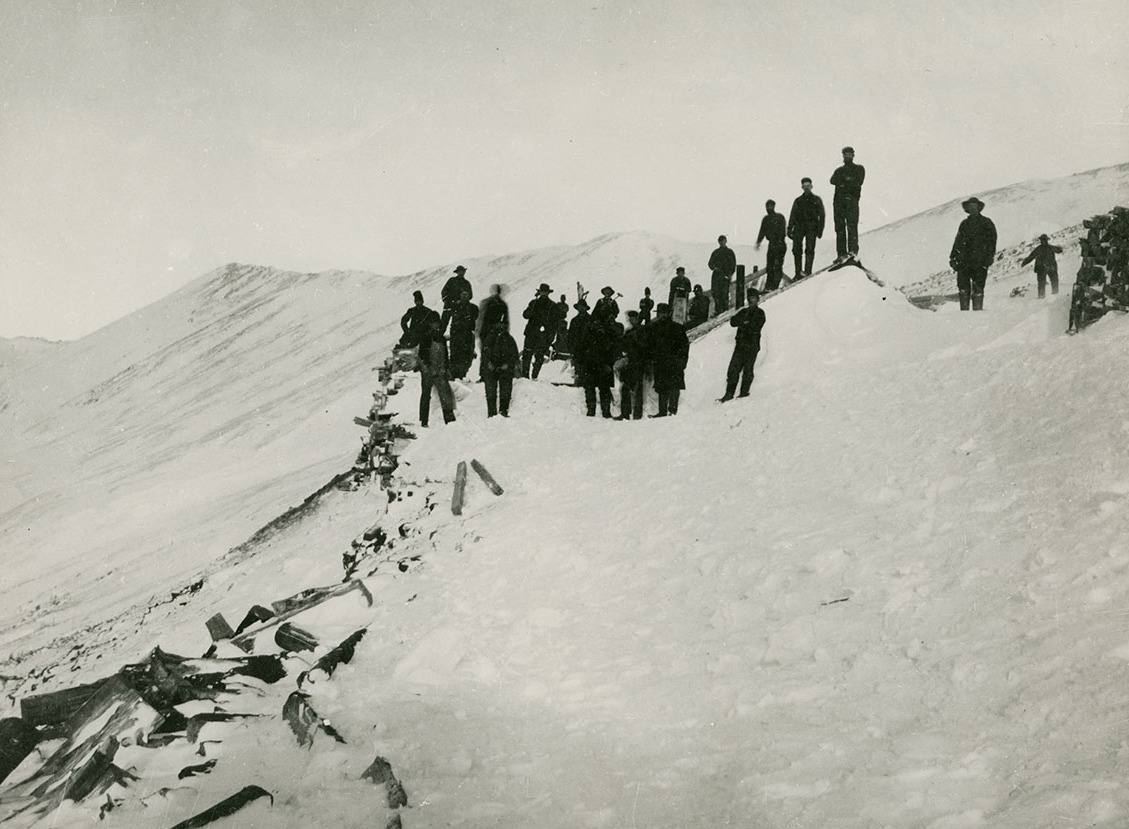
Miners on North Star Mountain in Colorado, 1879

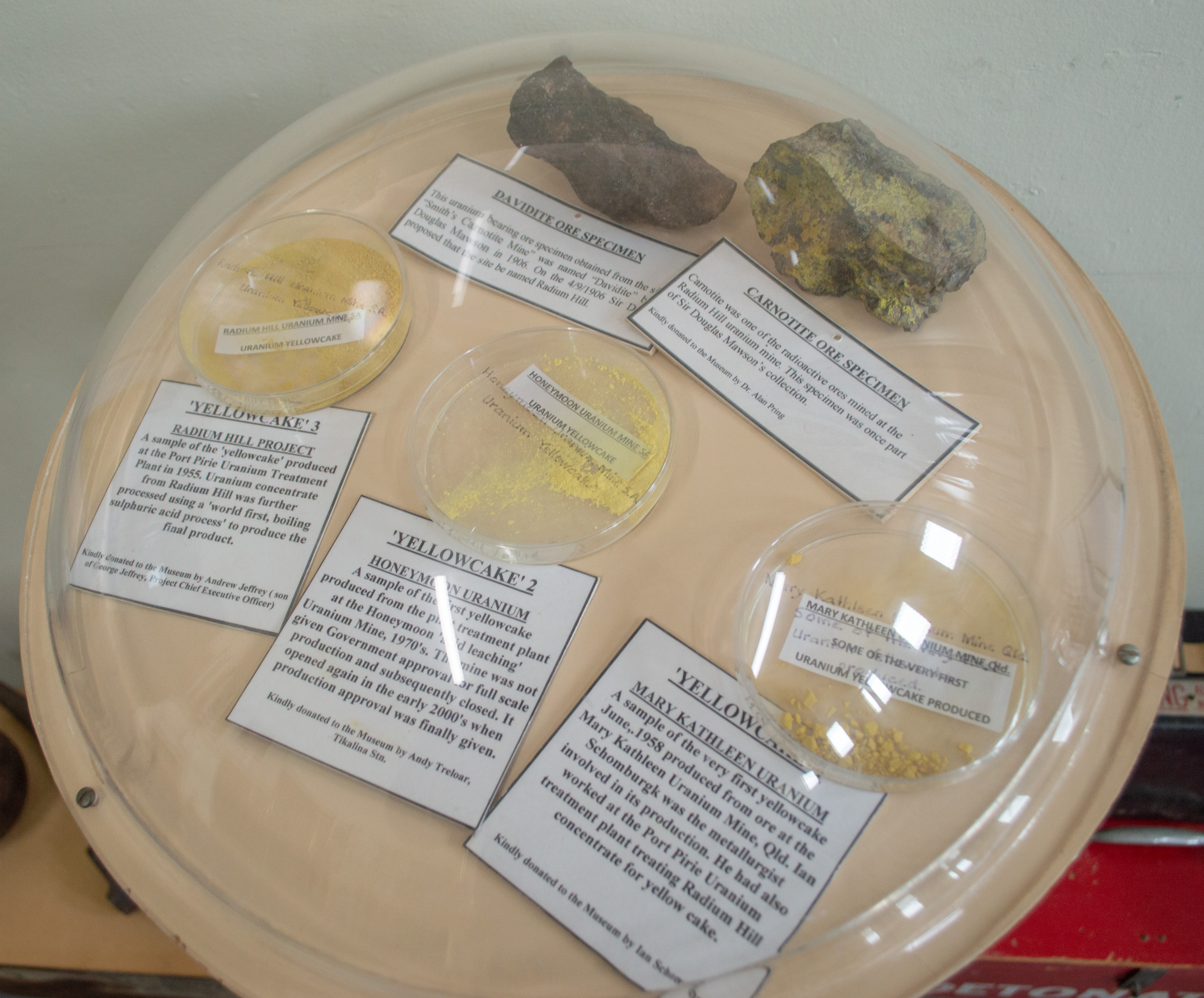
Yellowcake and ore mined in Australia

Before 1789, when Martin Heinrich Klaproth discovered the element, uranium compounds produced included nitrate, sulfate, phosphate, acetate and potassium- and sodium-diuranate. Klaproth detected the element in pitchblende from the George Wagsfort mine, Ore Mountains, and established commercial use as glass coloring. Pitchblende from these mountains was mentioned as early as 1565, and 110 t of uranium was produced from 1825 until 1898. In 1852, the uranium mineral autunite from the Massif Central was identified.

Around 1850, uranium mining began in Joachimsthal, Bohemia, where more than 620 t of uranium metal (tU) was produced from 1850 to 1898, with 10,000 tU produced before closure in 1968. In 1871, uranium ore mining began in Central City, Colorado, where 50 t were mined before 1895. In 1873, the uranium mining began in the South Terras mine, St Stephen-in-Brannel, Cornwall, producing most of the 300 tU from that area in the 19th century. In 1898, carnotite was first mined in the Uravan Mineral Belt, yielding 10 tU annually.

In 1898, Pierre Curie and Marie Skłodowska-Curie took delivery of 1 t of pitchblende from St. Joachimsthal, from which Marie identified the element radium. Pierre advocated its usage as a cancer cure, which fostered a spa business for that town.

In 1913, the Shinkolobwe, Katanga Province, was discovered. In 1931, the Port Radium deposit was discovered. Other significant discoveries included Beira Province, Tyuya Muyun, and Radium Hill.

=== Atomic age ===
Uranium production in 2015.

In 1922, Union Minière du Haut Katanga started producing medicinal radium from the Shinkolobwe mine, but closed down in the late 1930s as the radium market diminished. In May 1940, the Nazis invaded Belgium and seized Union Minière's uranium ore stored there. On 18 September 1942, 1250 t of Shinkolobwe uranium ore for the Manhattan Project was purchased from Union Minière's Edgar Sengier, who had stockpiled the ore in an Archer Daniels Midland warehouse near the Bayonne Bridge, Staten Island. In 1943, the Sengier reopened the Sinkolobwe mine with U.S. Army Corps of Engineers' resources, and a $13 million investment from the United States. Sengier reported that uranium ore had been extracted from the mine down to a depth of 79 meters, but that another 101 meters of ore was available for extraction. This amounted to 10,000 tons of up to 60% triuranium octoxide. The project also acquired most of the production from the Eldorado Mine (Northwest Territories).

According to Richard Rhodes, referring to German uranium research, "Auer, the thorium specialists ... delivered the first ton of pure uranium oxide processed from Joachimsthal ores to the War Office in January 1940. In June 1940 ... Auer ordered sixty tons of refined uranium oxide from the Union Miniére in occupied Belgium."

While the Soviet Republics of Kazakhstan and the RSFSR would later become some of the leading uranium producers in the world, immediately after the end of World War II the availability of large uranium deposits in the USSR wasn't yet known and thus the Soviets developed immense mining operations in their satellite states East Germany and Czechoslovakia which had known uranium deposits in the Ore Mountains. The deliberately opaquely named SDAG Wismut (the German term "Wismut" for Bismuth should give the illusion of prospection for a metal the Soviets definitely weren't after) became the biggest employer in the Saxon Ore Mountains and remote mining towns like Johanngeorgenstadt swelled to ten times their population in a few years. The mining cost immense amounts of money and miners were on the one hand subject to heavier repression and surveillance but on the other hand allowed more generous supply with consumer goods than other East Germans. While production was never able to compete with global uranium market prices, the dual use nature of the mined material as well as the possibility to pay miners in soft currency but sell uranium for hard currency or substitute imports which would have had to be paid for in hard currency tipped the scales in favor of continuing mining operations throughout the Cold War. After German reunification, mining was wound down and the arduous task of rehabilitating the land impacted by mining was begun.

The seventeen towns and mines under Wismut's control contributed 50 percent of the uranium used in the Soviet's first atomic bomb, Joe-1, and 80 percent of the uranium used in the Soviet nuclear program. Of the 150,000 laborers, 1281 were killed in accidents and 20,000 suffered injuries. After Stalin's death in 1953, the Red Army turned over control of production to SDAG, and prison laborers were released, reducing the population of laborers to 45,000. At its peak in 1953, the St. Joachimsthal mines had 16,100 inmates, half of whom were Soviet political prisoners.

By 1975, 75% of global uranium ore production came from quartz-pebble conglomerates and sandstones located in the Elliot Lake area of Canada, Witwatersrand, and the Colorado Plateau.

In 1990, 55% of world production came from underground mines, but this shrank to 33% by 1999. From 2000, new Canadian mines again increased the proportion of underground mining, and with Olympic Dam it is now 37%. In situ leach (ISL, or ISR) mining has been steadily increasing its share of the total, mainly due to Kazakhstan.

In 2009, top producing mines included the McArthur River uranium mine at 7400 tU, the Ranger Uranium Mine at 4423 tU, the Rössing uranium mine at 3574 tU, the Moiynkum Desert mines at 3250 tU, the Streltsovsk mine at 3003 tU, the Olympic Dam mine at 2981 tU, the Arlit mine at 1808 tU, the Rabbit Lake mine at 1400 tU, the Akouta mine at 1435 tU, and the McClean Lake mine at 1400 tU. The world's largest deposits include the Olympic Dam mine at 295,000 tU, the Imouraren mine at 183,520 tU, the McArthur River mine at 128,900 tU, the Streltsovsk mine at 118,341 tU, the Novokonstantinovka mines at 93,630, the Cigar Lake Mine at 80,500 tU, Uzbekistan mines at 76,000 tU, the Elkon mine at 71,300 tU, the Brazilian Itataia complex at 67,240 tU, the Marenica project at 62,856 tU, the Langer Heinrich Mine at 60,830 tU, the Dominion mine at 55,753 tU, the Inkai Uranium Project at 51,808 tU, the Kiggavik project at 51,574 tU, the Rössing mine at 50,657 tU, the Australian Yeleerie project at 44,077, and the Trekkopje mine at 42,243 tU.

== Deposit types ==
Many different types of uranium deposits have been discovered and mined. There are mainly three types of uranium deposits including unconformity-type deposits, namely paleoplacer deposits and sandstone-type, also known as roll front type deposits.

Uranium deposits are classified into 15 categories according to their geological setting and the type of rock in which they are found. This geological classification system is determined by the International Atomic Energy Agency (IAEA).

Uranium is also contained in seawater but at present prices on the uranium market, costs would have to be lowered by a factor of 3–6 to make its recovery economical.

=== Sedimentary ===
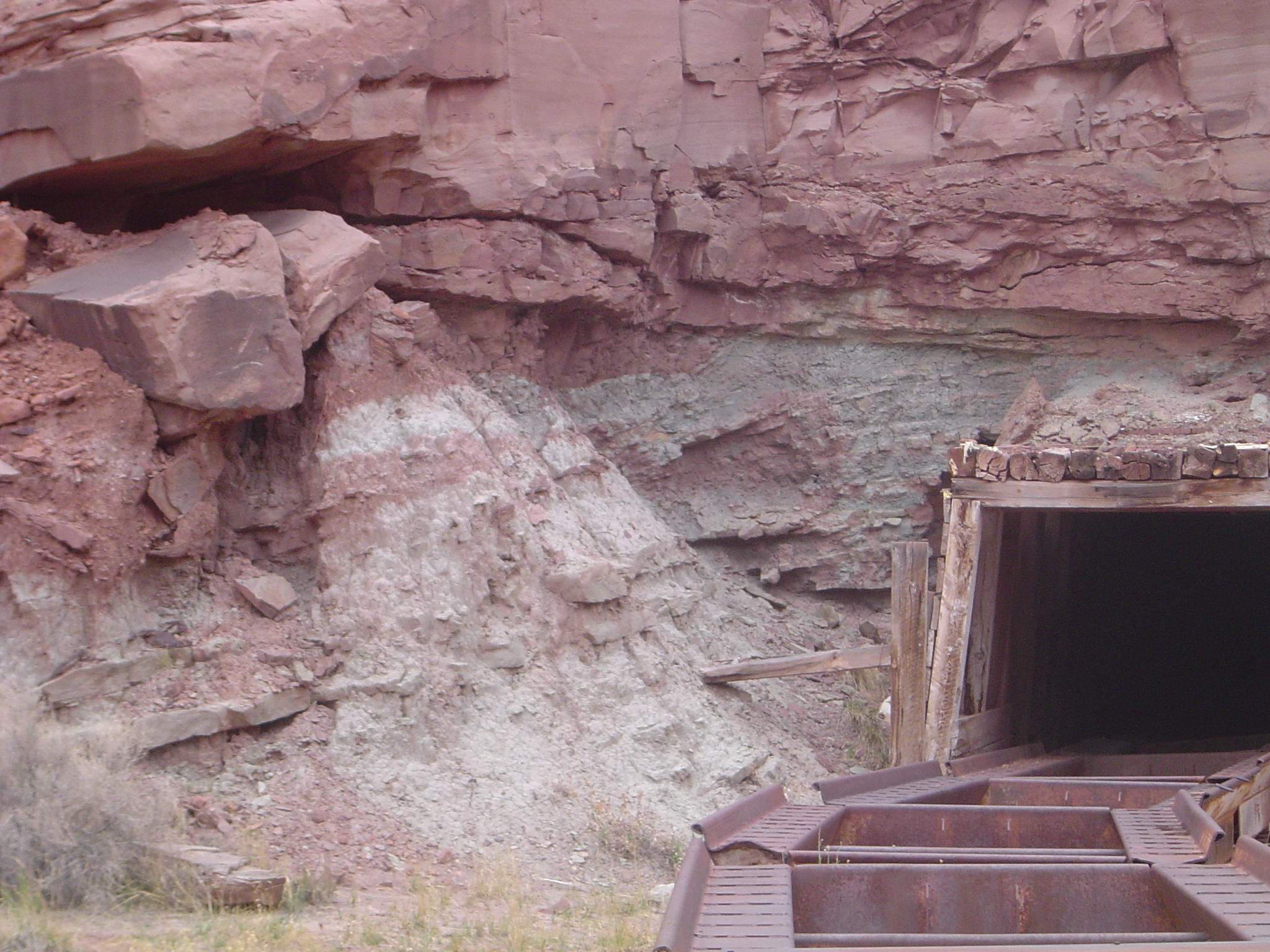
The Mi Vida uranium mine, near Moab, Utah. Note alternating red and white/green sandstone. This type of uranium deposit is easier and cheaper to mine than the other types because the uranium is found not far from the surface of the crust.

Uranium deposits in sedimentary rocks include those in sandstone (in Canada and the western US), Precambrian unconformities (in Canada), phosphate, Precambrian quartz-pebble conglomerate, collapse breccia pipes (see Arizona breccia pipe uranium mineralization), and calcrete.

Sandstone uranium deposits are generally of two types. Roll-front type deposits occur at the boundary between the up dip and oxidized part of a sandstone body and the deeper down dip reduced part of a sandstone body. Peneconcordant sandstone uranium deposits, also called Colorado Plateau–type deposits, most often occur within generally oxidized sandstone bodies, often in localized reduced zones, such as in association with carbonized wood in the sandstone.

Precambrian quartz-pebble conglomerate-type uranium deposits occur only in rocks older than two billion years old. The conglomerates also contain pyrite. These deposits have been mined in the Blind River–Elliot Lake district of Ontario, Canada, and from the gold-bearing Witwatersrand conglomerates of South Africa.

Unconformity-type deposits make up about 33% of the World Outside Centrally Planned Economies Areas' (WOCA) uranium deposits.

=== Igneous or hydrothermal ===
Hydrothermal uranium deposits encompass the vein-type uranium ores. Vein-type hydrothermal uranium deposits represent epigenetic concentrations of uranium minerals that typically fill breccias, fractures, and shear zones. Many studies have sought to identify the source of uranium with hydrothermal vein-type deposits and the potential sources still remains a mystery, but are thought to include preexisting rocks that have been broken down by weathering and force that come from areas of long-term sediment build up. The South Chine Block is an example of a region that has been relying on vein-type hydrothermal uranium deposit demand for the past half century. Igneous deposits include nepheline syenite intrusives at Ilimaussaq, Greenland; the disseminated uranium deposit at Rossing, Namibia; uranium-bearing pegmatites, and the Aurora crater lake deposit of the McDermitt Caldera in Oregon. Disseminated deposits are also found in the states of Washington and Alaska in the US.

=== Breccia ===
Breccia uranium deposits are found in rocks that have been broken due to tectonic fracturing, or weathering. Breccia uranium deposits are most common in India, Australia and the United States. A large mass of breccia is called a breccia pipe or chimney and is composed of the rock forming an irregular and almost cylinder-like shape. The origin of breccia pipe is uncertain but it is thought that they form on intersections and faults. When the formations are found solid in ground host rock called rock flour, it usually is often a site for copper or uranium mining. Copper Creek, Arizona, is home to approximately 500 mineralized breccia pipes and Cripple Creek, Colorado, also is a site that contains breccia pipe ore deposits that is associated with a volcanic pipe.

Olympic Dam mine, the world's largest uranium deposit, was discovered by Western Mining Corporation in 1975 and is owned by BHP.

== Exploration ==
Uranium prospecting is similar to other forms of mineral exploration with the exception of some specialized instruments for detecting the presence of radioactive isotopes.

The Geiger counter was the original radiation detector, recording the total count rate from all energy levels of radiation. Ionization chambers and Geiger counters were first adapted for field use in the 1930s. The first transportable Geiger–Müller counter (weighing 25 kg) was constructed at the University of British Columbia in 1932. H.V. Ellsworth of the GSC built a lighter weight, more practical unit in 1934. Subsequent models were the principal instruments used for uranium prospecting for many years, until geiger counters were replaced by scintillation counters.

The use of airborne detectors to prospect for radioactive minerals was first proposed by G. C. Ridland, a geophysicist working at Port Radium in 1943. In 1947, the earliest recorded trial of airborne radiation detectors (ionization chambers and Geiger counters) was conducted by Eldorado Mining and Refining Limited. (a Canadian Crown Corporation since sold to become Cameco Corporation). The first patent for a portable gamma-ray spectrometer was filed by Professors Pringle, Roulston & Brownell of the University of Manitoba in 1949, the same year as they tested the first portable scintillation counter on the ground and in the air in northern Saskatchewan.

Airborne gamma-ray spectrometry is now the accepted leading technique for uranium prospecting with worldwide applications for geological mapping, mineral exploration & environmental monitoring. Airborne gamma-ray spectrometry used specifically for uranium measurement and prospecting must account for a number of factors like the distance between the source and the detector and the scattering of radiation through the minerals, surrounding earth and even in the air. In Australia, a Weathering Intensity Index has been developed to help prospectors based on the Shuttle Radar Topography Mission (SRTM) elevation and airborne gamma-ray spectrometry images.

A deposit of uranium, discovered by geophysical techniques, is evaluated and sampled to determine the amounts of uranium materials that are extractable at specified costs from the deposit. Uranium reserves are the amounts of ore that are estimated to be recoverable at stated costs. As prices rise or technology allows for lower cost of recovery of known, previously uneconomic, deposits, reserves increase. For uranium this effect is particularly pronounced as the biggest currently uneconomic reserve – uranium extraction from seawater – is bigger than all known land based resources of uranium combined.

From 2008 through at least 2024, the only four countries that have reported non-domestic uranium exploration and development expenses are: China, Japan, France, and Russia.

The U.S. is investigating whether China is circumventing a ban on Russian uranium imports by exporting its uranium to the U.S. while importing enriched uranium from Russia. This inquiry follows a spike in Chinese uranium exports to the U.S. after the December 2023 ban, which aimed to cut off funding for Russia's war in Ukraine.

== Mining techniques ==
As with other types of hard rock mining there are several methods of extraction. In 2022, the percentage of the mined uranium produced by each mining method was: in-situ leach (59.8 percent), underground mining (18.0 percent), open pit (15.9 percent), heap leaching (0.0 percent, since around 2018), co-product/by-product (6.1%). Since 2015, the in-situ leaching has been producing increasing shares of the uranium production worldwide, as it presents itself as a lower-cost alternative, especially in Kazakhstan reaching its peak in 2021. Changes in distribution of production methods can also be explained by the closing or re-opening of previously idle mines, for example the revival of the McArthur River mine in Canada, which uses underground mining, or the closure of the Ranger mine in Australia, and Akouta mine in Niger, which significantly reduced the proportion of open pit mining.

=== Open pit ===
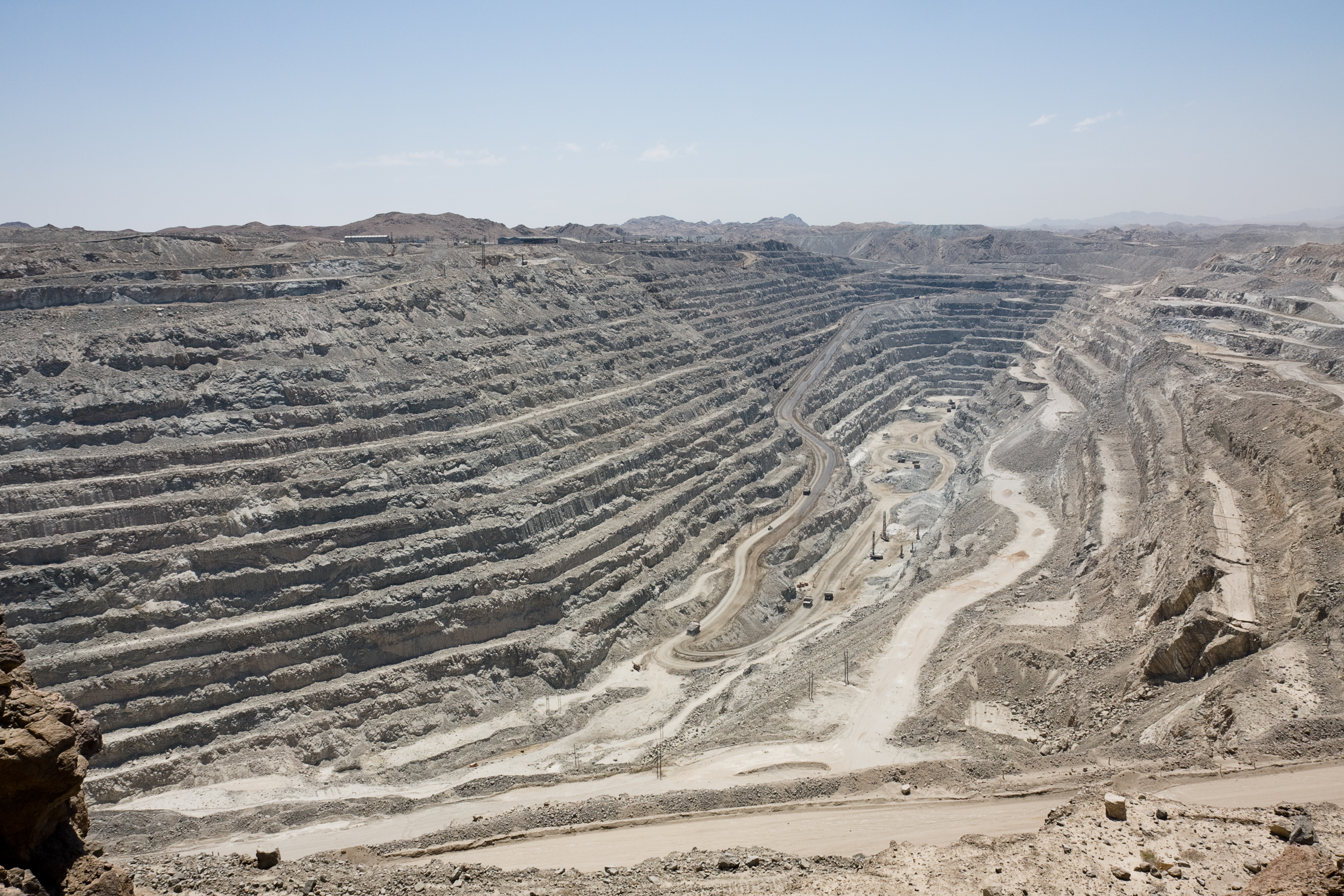
Rössing open pit uranium mine, Namibia

In open pit mining, overburden is removed by drilling and blasting to expose the ore body, which is then mined by blasting and excavation using loaders and dump trucks . Workers spend much time in enclosed cabins thus limiting exposure to radiation . Water is extensively used to suppress airborne dust levels. Groundwater is an issue in all types of mining, but in open pit mining, the usual way of dealing with it – i.e. when the target mineral is found below the natural water table – is to lower the water table by pumping off the water . The ground may settle considerably when groundwater is removed and may again move unpredictably when groundwater is allowed to rise again after mining is concluded . Land reclamation after mining takes different routes, depending on the amount of material removed. Due to the high energy density of uranium, it is often sufficient to fill in the former mine with the overburden, but in case of a mass deficit exceeding the height difference between the previous surface level and the natural water table, artificial lakes develop when groundwater removal ceases . If sulfites, sulfides or sulfates are present in the now-exposed rocks acid mine drainage can be a concern for those newly developing bodies of water . Mining companies are now required by law to establish a fund for future reclamation while mining is ongoing and those funds are usually deposited in such a way as to be unaffected by bankruptcy of the mining company .

=== Underground ===
If the uranium is too far below the surface for open pit mining, an underground mine might be used with tunnels and shafts dug to access and remove uranium ore.

Underground uranium mining is in principle no different from any other hard rock mining and other ores are often mined in association (e.g., copper, gold, silver). Once the ore body has been identified a shaft is sunk in the vicinity of the ore veins, and crosscuts are driven horizontally to the veins at various levels, usually every 100 to 150 metres. Similar tunnels, known as drifts, are driven along the ore veins from the crosscut. To extract the ore, the next step is to drive tunnels, known as raises when driven upwards and winzes when driven downward, through the deposit from level to level. Raises are subsequently used to develop the stopes where the ore is mined from the veins.

The stope, which is the workshop of the mine, is the excavation from which the ore is extracted. Three methods of stope mining are commonly used. In the "cut and fill" or "open stoping" method, the space remaining following removal of ore after blasting is filled with waste rock and cement. In the "shrinkage" method, only sufficient broken ore is removed via the chutes below to allow miners working from the top of the pile to drill and blast the next layer to be broken off, eventually leaving a large hole. The method known as "room and pillar" is used for thinner, flatter ore bodies. In this method the ore body is first divided into blocks by intersecting drives, removing ore while so doing, and then systematically removing the blocks, leaving enough ore for roof support.

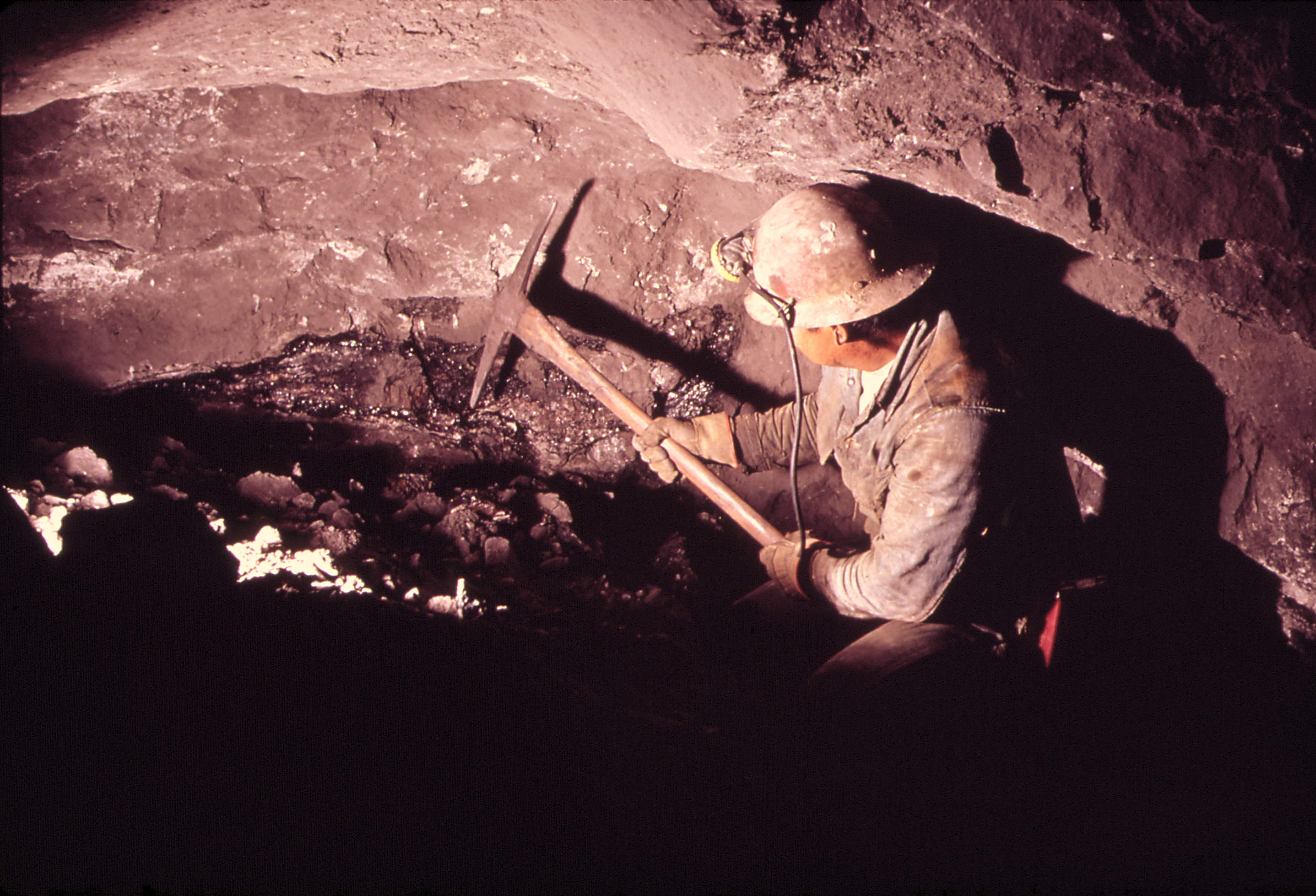
Historical method of underground uranium mining, Nucla, Colorado, 1972

The health effects discovered from radon exposure in unventilated uranium mining prompted the switch away from uranium mining via tunnel mining towards open cut and in-situ leaching technology, a method of extraction that does not produce the same occupational hazards, or mine tailings, as conventional mining.

With regulations in place to ensure the use of high volume ventilation technology if any confined space uranium mining is occurring, occupational exposure and mining deaths can be largely eliminated. The Olympic Dam and Canadian underground mines are ventilated with powerful fans with radon levels being kept at a very low to practically "safe level" in uranium mines. Naturally occurring radon in other, non-uranium mines, also may need control by ventilation.

=== Heap leaching ===
Heap leaching is an extraction process by which chemicals (usually sulfuric acid) are used to extract the economic element from ore which has been mined and placed in piles on the surface. Heap leaching is generally economically feasible only for oxide ore deposits. Oxidation of sulfide deposits occurs during the geological process called weathering. Therefore, oxide ore deposits are typically found close to the surface. If there are no other economic elements within the ore a mine might choose to extract the uranium using a leaching agent, usually a low molar sulfuric acid.

If the economic and geological conditions are right, the mining company will level large areas of land with a small gradient, layering it with thick plastic (usually HDPE or LLDPE), sometimes with clay, silt or sand beneath the plastic liner. The extracted ore will typically be run through a crusher and placed in heaps atop the plastic. The leaching agent will then be sprayed on the ore for 30–90 days. As the leaching agent filters through the heap, the uranium will break its bonds with the oxide rock and enter the solution. The solution will then filter along the gradient into collecting pools which will then be pumped to on-site plants for further processing. Only some of the uranium (commonly about 70%) is actually extracted.

The uranium concentrations within the solution are very important for the efficient separation of pure uranium from the acid. As different heaps will yield different concentrations, the solution is pumped to a mixing plant that is carefully monitored. The properly balanced solution is then pumped into a processing plant where the uranium is separated from the sulfuric acid.

Heap leach is significantly cheaper than traditional milling processes. The low costs allow for lower grade ore to be economically feasible (given that it is the right type of ore body). US environmental law requires that the surrounding ground water is continually monitored for possible contamination. The mine will also have to have continued monitoring even after the shutdown of the mine. In the past mining companies would sometimes go bankrupt, leaving the responsibility of mine reclamation to the public. 21st century additions to US mining law require that companies set aside the money for reclamation before the beginning of the project. The money will be held by the public to insure adherence to environmental standards if the company were to ever go bankrupt.

=== In-situ leaching ===
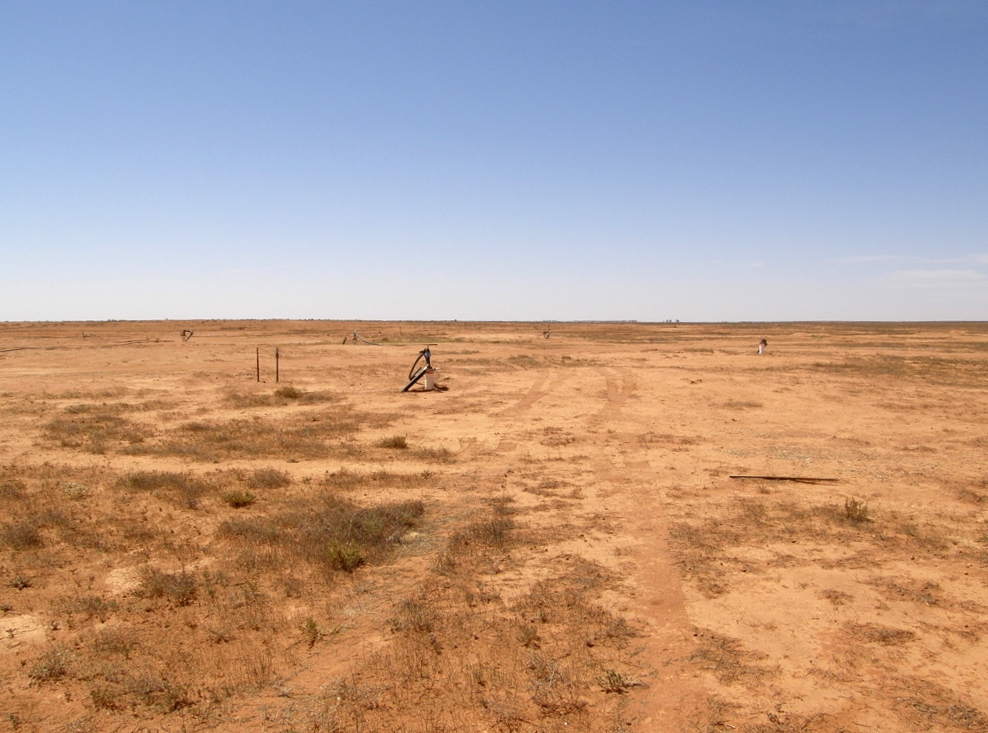
Trial well field for in situ recovery at Honeymoon, South Australia

In situ leaching (ISL), also known as solution mining, or in situ recovery (ISR) in North America, involves leaving the ore where it is in the ground, and recovering the minerals from it by dissolving them and pumping the pregnant solution to the surface where the minerals can be recovered. Consequently, there is little surface disturbance and no tailings or waste rock generated. However, the orebody needs to be permeable to the liquids used, and located so that they do not contaminate ground water away from the orebody.

Uranium ISL uses the native groundwater in the orebody which is fortified with a complexing agent and in most cases an oxidant. It is then pumped through the underground orebody to recover the minerals in it by leaching. Once the pregnant solution is returned to the surface, the uranium is recovered in much the same way as in any other uranium plant (mill).

In Australian ISL mines (Beverley, Four Mile and Honeymoon Mine) the oxidant used is hydrogen peroxide and the complexing agent sulfuric acid. Kazakh ISL mines generally do not employ an oxidant but use much higher acid concentrations in the circulating solutions. ISL mines in the USA use an alkali leach due to the presence of significant quantities of acid-consuming minerals such as gypsum and limestone in the host aquifers. Any more than a few percent carbonate minerals means that alkali leach must be used in preference to the more efficient acid leach.

The Australian government has published a best practice guide for in situ leach mining of uranium, which is being revised to take account of international differences.

=== Seawater recovery ===
The uranium concentration in sea water is low, approximately 3.3 parts per billion or 3.3 micrograms per liter of seawater. The total quantity in all of the world's oceans has been estimated at 4 billion tons, 1,000 times the estimated land-based reserves. Some scientists believe this resource is practically limitless with respect to world-wide demand. That is to say, if even a portion of the uranium in seawater could be used the entire world's nuclear power generation fuel could be provided over a long time period. Some proponents claim this statistic is exaggerated. It is believed that uranium extracted on an industrial scale from seawater would constantly be replenished by uranium leached from the surface area of the ocean floor, which is believed to contain 1,000 times the uranium as the ocean itsself. Some commentators have argued that this strengthens the case for nuclear power to be considered a renewable energy.

Although research and development for recovery of this low-concentration element by inorganic adsorbents such as titanium oxide compounds has occurred since the 1960s in the United Kingdom, France, Germany, and Japan, this research was halted due to low recovery efficiency.

At the Takasaki Radiation Chemistry Research Establishment of the Japan Atomic Energy Research Institute (JAERI Takasaki Research Establishment), research and development has continued culminating in the production of adsorbent by irradiation of polymer fiber. Adsorbents have been synthesized that have a functional group (amidoxime group) that selectively adsorbs heavy metals, and the performance of such adsorbents has been improved. Uranium adsorption capacity of the polymer fiber adsorbent is high, approximately tenfold greater in comparison to the conventional titanium oxide adsorbent.

One method of extracting uranium from seawater is using a uranium-specific nonwoven fabric as an adsorbent. The total amount of uranium recovered from three collection boxes containing 350 kg of fabric was >1 kg of yellowcake after 240 days of submersion in the ocean. The experiment by Seko et al. was repeated by Tamada et al. in 2006. They found that the cost varied from ¥15,000 to ¥88,000 depending on assumptions and "The lowest cost attainable now is ¥25,000 with 4g-U/kg-adsorbent used in the sea area of Okinawa, with 18 repetitionuses [sic]." With the May, 2008 exchange rate, this was about $240/kg-U.

In 2012, ORNL researchers announced the successful development of a new adsorbent material dubbed "HiCap", which vastly outperforms previous best adsorbents, which perform surface retention of solid or gas molecules, atoms or ions. "We have shown that our adsorbents can extract five to seven times more uranium at uptake rates seven times faster than the world's best adsorbents," said Chris Janke, one of the inventors and a member of ORNL's Materials Science and Technology Division. HiCap also effectively removes toxic metals from water, according to results verified by researchers at Pacific Northwest National Laboratory.

In 2012 it was estimated that this fuel source could be extracted at 10 times the current price of uranium. In 2014, with the advances made in the efficiency of seawater uranium extraction, it was suggested that it would be economically competitive to produce fuel for light water reactors from seawater if the process was implemented at large scale.

In 2025, Chinese researchers demonstrated uranium recovery from seawater at a cost that may be competitive with traditional mining techniques.

=== Co-product/by-product ===
Uranium can be recovered as a by-product along with other co-products such as molybdenum, vanadium, nickel, zinc and petroleum products. Uranium is also often found in phosphate minerals, where it has to be removed because phosphate is mostly used for fertilizers. Phosphogypsum is a waste product from phosphate mining that can contain significant amounts of uranium and radium. Coal fly ash also contains significant amounts of uranium and has been suggested as a source for uranium extraction.

== Resources ==
Uranium occurs naturally in many rocks, and even in seawater. However, like other metals, it is seldom sufficiently concentrated to be economically recoverable. Like any resource, uranium cannot be mined at any desired concentration. No matter the technology, at some point it is too costly to mine lower grade ores. Mining companies usually consider concentrations greater than 0.075% (750 ppm) as ore, or rock economical to mine at current uranium market prices. There are around 40 trillion tons of uranium in Earth's crust, but most is distributed at trace concentration over its 3×10^{19} ton mass. Estimates of the amount concentrated into ores affordable to extract for under $130 per kg can be less than a millionth of that total.

Uranium grades
Source	Concentration
Very high-grade ore – 20% U	200,000 ppm U
High-grade ore – 2% U	20,000 ppm U
Low-grade ore – 0.1% U	1,000 ppm U
Very low-grade ore – 0.01% U	100 ppm U
Granite	4–5 ppm U
Sedimentary rock	2 ppm U
Earth's continental crust (av)	2.8 ppm U
Seawater	0.003 ppm U

Economically extractable reserves of uranium (0.01% ore or better)
Ore concentration	tonnes of uranium	Ore type
>1%	10000	vein deposits
0.2–1%	2 million	pegmatites, unconformity deposits
0.1–0.2%	80 million	fossil placers, sandstones
0.02–0.1%	100 million	lower grade fossil placers, sandstones
100–200 ppm	2 billion	volcanic deposits
The table assumes the fuel will be used in a LWR burner. Uranium becomes far more economical when used in a fast burner reactor such as the Integral Fast Reactor.

Uranium-235, the fissile isotope of uranium used in nuclear reactors, makes up about 0.7% of uranium from ore. It is the only naturally occurring isotope capable of directly generating nuclear power. While uranium-235 can be "bred" from ^{234}U, a natural decay product of ^{238}U present at 55 ppm in all natural uranium samples, uranium-235 is ultimately a finite non-renewable resource. Due to the currently low price of uranium, the majority of commercial light water reactors operate on a "once through fuel cycle" which leaves virtually all the energy contained in the original ^{238}U, which makes up over 99% of natural uranium, unused. Nuclear reprocessing can recover part of that energy by producing MOX fuel or Remix Fuel for use in conventional power generating light water reactors. This technology is currently used at industrial scale in France, Russia and Japan. However, at current uranium prices, this is widely deemed uneconomical if only the "input" side is considered.

Breeder reactor technology could allow the current reserves of uranium to provide power for humanity for billions of years, thus making nuclear power a sustainable energy.

=== Reserves ===
Reserves are the most readily available resources. About 96% of the global uranium reserves are found in these ten countries: Australia, Canada, Kazakhstan, South Africa, Brazil, Namibia, Uzbekistan, the United States, Niger, and Russia.

The known uranium resources represent a higher level of assured resources than is normal for most minerals. Further exploration and higher prices will certainly, on the basis of present geological knowledge, yield further resources as present ones are used up. There was very little uranium exploration between 1985 and 2005, so the significant increase in exploration effort that we are now seeing could readily double the known economic resources. On the basis of analogies with other metal minerals, a doubling of price from price levels in 2007 could be expected to create about a tenfold increase in measured resources, over time.

=== Known conventional resources ===
Known conventional resources are resources that are known to exist and easy to mine. In 2006, there were about 4 million tons of conventional resources. In 2011, this increased to 7 million tonnes. Exploration for uranium has increased: from 1981 to 2007, annual exploration expenditures grew modestly, from US$4 million to US$7 million. This increased to US$11 million in 2011.

The world's largest deposits of uranium are found in three countries. Australia has just over 30% of the world's reasonably assured resources and inferred resources of uranium – about 1.673 megatonnes (3.69×10^{9} lb). Kazakhstan has about 12% of the world's reserves, or about 651 kilotonnes (1.4×10^{9} lb). Canada has 485 kilotonnes (1,100×10^{6} lb) of uranium, representing about 9%.

=== Undiscovered conventional resources ===
Undiscovered conventional resources are resources that are thought to exist but have not been mined. It will take a significant exploration and development effort to locate the remaining deposits and begin mining them. However, since the entire earth's geography has not been explored for uranium at this time, there is still the potential to discover exploitable resources. The OECD Redbook cites areas still open to exploration throughout the world. Many countries are conducting complete aeromagnetic gradiometer radiometric surveys to get an estimate the size of their undiscovered mineral resources. Combined with a gamma-ray survey, these methods can locate undiscovered uranium and thorium deposits. The U.S. Department of Energy conducted the first and only national uranium assessment in 1980 – the National Uranium Resource Evaluation (NURE) program.

=== Secondary resources ===
Secondary uranium resources are recovered from other sources such as nuclear weapons, inventories, reprocessing and re-enrichment. Since secondary resources have exceedingly low discovery costs and very low production costs, they have displaced a significant portion of primary production. In 2017, about 7% of uranium demand was met from secondary resources.

Due to reduction in nuclear weapons stockpiles, a large amount of former weapons uranium was released for use in civilian nuclear reactors. As a result, starting in 1990, a significant portion of uranium nuclear power requirements were supplied by former weapons uranium, rather than newly mined uranium. In 2002, mined uranium supplied only 54 percent of nuclear power requirements. But as the supply of former weapons uranium has been used up, mining has increased, so that in 2012, mining provided 95 percent of reactor requirements, and the OCED Nuclear Energy Agency and the International Atomic Energy Agency projected that the gap in supply would be completely erased in 2013.

==== Inventories ====
Inventories are kept by a variety of organizations – government, commercial and others.

The US DOE keeps inventories for security of supply to cover for emergencies where uranium is not available at any price.

==== Decommissioning nuclear weapons ====
Both the US and Russia have committed to recycle their nuclear weapons into fuel for electricity production. This program is known as the Megatons to Megawatts Program. Down blending 500 tonnes (1,100×10^{3} lb) of Russian weapons high enriched uranium (HEU) will result in about 15 kilotonnes (33,000×10^{3} lb) of low enriched uranium (LEU) over 20 years. This is equivalent to about 152 kilotonnes (340×10^{6} lb) of natural U, or just over twice annual world demand. Since 2000, 30 tonnes (66×10^{3} lb) of military HEU is displacing about 10.6 kilotonnes (23×10^{6} lb) of uranium oxide mine production per year which represents some 13% of world reactor requirements. The Megatons to Megawatts program came to an end in 2013.

Plutonium recovered from nuclear weapons or other sources can be blended with uranium fuel to produce a mixed-oxide fuel. In June 2000, the US and Russia agreed to dispose of 34 kilotonnes (75×10^{6} lb) each of weapons-grade plutonium by 2014. The US undertook to pursue a self-funded dual track program (immobilization and MOX). The G-7 nations provided US$1 billion to set up Russia's program. The latter was initially MOX specifically designed for VVER reactors, the Russian version of the Pressurized Water Reactor (PWR), the high cost being because this was not part of Russia's fuel cycle policy. This MOX fuel for both countries is equivalent to about 12 kilotonnes (26×10^{6} lb) of natural uranium. The U.S. also has commitments to dispose of 151 tonnes (330×10^{3} lb) of non-waste HEU.

==== Reprocessing and recycling ====
Nuclear reprocessing (or recycling) can increase the supply of uranium by separating the uranium from spent nuclear fuel. Spent nuclear fuel is primarily composed of uranium, with a typical concentration of around 96% by mass. The composition of reprocessed uranium depends on the time the fuel has been in the reactor, but it is mostly uranium-238, with about 1% uranium-235, 1% uranium-236 and smaller amounts of other isotopes including uranium-232.

Currently, there are eleven reprocessing plants in the world. Of these, two are large-scale commercially operated plants for the reprocessing of spent fuel elements from light water reactors with throughputs of more than 1 kilotonne (2.2×10^{6} lb) of uranium per year. These are La Hague, France with a capacity of 1.6 kilotonnes (3.5×10^{6} lb) per year and Sellafield, England at 1.2 kilotonnes (2.6×10^{6} lb) uranium per year. The rest are small experimental plants. The two large-scale commercial reprocessing plants together can reprocess 2,800 tonnes of uranium waste annually. The United States had reprocessing plants in the past but banned reprocessing in the late 1970s due to the high costs and the risk of nuclear proliferation via plutonium.

The main problems with uranium reprocessing are the cost of mined uranium compared to the cost of reprocessing, At present, reprocessing and the use of plutonium as reactor fuel is far more expensive than using uranium fuel and disposing of the spent fuel directly – even if the fuel is only reprocessed once. Reprocessing is most useful as part of a nuclear fuel cycle using fast-neutron reactors since reprocessed uranium and reactor-grade plutonium both have isotopic compositions not optimal for use in today's thermal-neutron reactors.

=== Unconventional resources ===
Unconventional resources are occurrences that require novel technologies for their exploitation and/or use. Often unconventional resources occur in low-concentration. The exploitation of unconventional uranium requires additional research and development efforts for which there is no imminent economic need, given the large conventional resource base and the option of reprocessing spent fuel. Phosphates, seawater, uraniferous coal ash, and some type of oil shales are examples of unconventional uranium resources.

==== Phosphates ====
Uranium occurs at concentrations of 50 to 200 parts per million (ppm) in phosphate-laden earth or phosphate rock. As uranium prices increase, there has been interest in extraction of uranium from phosphate rock, which is normally used as the basis of phosphate fertilizers. There are 22 million tons of uranium in phosphate deposits. Recovery of uranium from phosphates is a mature technology; it has been used in Belgium and the United States, but high recovery costs limit the use of these resources, with estimated production costs in the range of US$60–100/kgU including capital investment, according to a 2003 OECD report for a new 100 tU/year project. Historical operating costs for the uranium recovery from phosphoric acid range from $48–$119/kg U_{3}O_{8}. In 2011, the average price paid for U_{3}O_{8} in the United States was $122.66/kg.

Worldwide, approximately 400 wet-process phosphoric acid plants were in operation. Assuming an average recoverable content of 100 ppm of uranium, and that uranium prices do not increase so that the main use of the phosphates are for fertilizers, this scenario would result in a maximum theoretical annual output of 3.7 kilotonnes (8.2×10^{6} lb) U_{3}O_{8}.

==== Seawater ====
Unconventional uranium resources include up to 4,000 megatonnes (8,800×10^{9} lb) of uranium contained in sea water. Several technologies to extract uranium from sea water have been demonstrated at the laboratory scale. According to the OECD, uranium may be extracted from seawater for about US$300/kgU.

In 2012, ORNL researchers announced the successful development of a new absorbent material dubbed HiCap, which vastly outperforms previous best adsorbents, which perform surface retention of solid or gas molecules, atoms or ions. "We have shown that our adsorbents can extract five to seven times more uranium at uptake rates seven times faster than the world's best adsorbents", said Chris Janke, one of the inventors and a member of ORNL's Materials Science and Technology Division. HiCap also effectively removes toxic metals from water, according to results verified by researchers at Pacific Northwest National Laboratory.

In 2025, researchers introduced a technique that uses electrodeposition on a covalent organic framework (COF), a porous crystalline polymer PEDOT that infused the pores of an amidoxime-functionalised, fully π-conjugated sp^{2}c-COF-A. The electrode can be repeatedly regenerated and reused.

==== Uraniferous coal ash ====
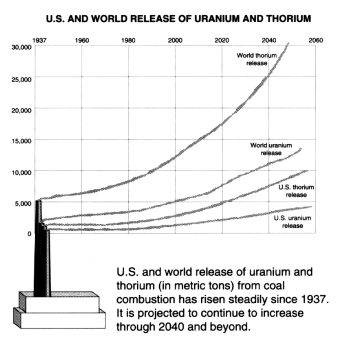
Annual release of "technologically enhanced"/concentrated Naturally occurring radioactive material, uranium and thorium radioisotopes naturally found in coal and concentrated in heavy/bottom coal ash and airborne fly ash. As predicted by ORNL to cumulatively amount to 2.9 million tons over the 1937–2040 period, from the combustion of an estimated 637 billion tons of coal worldwide.

According to a study by Oak Ridge National Laboratory, the theoretical maximum energy potential (when used in breeder reactors) of trace uranium and thorium in coal actually exceeds the energy released by burning the coal itself. This is despite very low concentration of uranium in coal of only several parts per million average before combustion.

From 1965 to 1967 Union Carbide operated a mill in North Dakota, United States, burning uraniferous lignite and extracting uranium from the ash. The plant produced about 150 metric tons of U_{3}O_{8} before shutting down.

An international consortium has set out to explore the commercial extraction of uranium from uraniferous coal ash from coal power stations located in Yunnan province, China. The first laboratory scale amount of yellowcake uranium recovered from uraniferous coal ash was announced in 2007. The three coal power stations at Xiaolongtang, Dalongtang and Kaiyuan have piled up their waste ash. Initial tests from the Xiaolongtang ash pile indicate that the material contains (160–180 parts per million uranium), suggesting a total of 2.085 kilotonnes (4.60×10^{6} lb) U_{3}O_{8} could be recovered from that ash pile alone.

==== Oil shales ====
Some oil shales contain uranium, which may be recovered as a byproduct. Between 1946 and 1952, a marine type of Dictyonema shale was used for uranium production in Sillamäe, Estonia, and between 1950 and 1989 alum shale was used in Sweden for the same purpose.

=== Breeding ===
A breeder reactor produces more nuclear fuel than it consumes and thus can extend the uranium supply. It typically turns the dominant isotope in natural uranium, uranium-238, into fissile plutonium-239. This results in a hundredfold increase in the amount of energy to be produced per mass unit of uranium, because uranium-238, which comprises 99.3% of natural uranium, is not used in conventional reactors, which instead use uranium-235 (comprising 0.7% of natural uranium). In 1983, physicist Bernard Cohen proposed that the world supply of uranium is effectively inexhaustible, and could therefore be considered a form of renewable energy. He claims that fast breeder reactors, fueled by naturally-replenished uranium-238 extracted from seawater, could supply energy at least as long as the sun's expected remaining lifespan of five billion years.

There are two types of breeders: fast breeders and thermal breeders. Efforts at commercializing breeder reactors have been largely unsuccessful, due to higher costs and complexity compared to LWR, as well as political opposition. A few commercial breeder reactors exist. In 2016, the Russian BN-800 fast-neutron breeder reactor started producing commercially at full power (800 MWe), joining the previous BN-600. As of 2020, the Chinese CFR-600 is under construction after the success of the China Experimental Fast Reactor, based on the BN-800. These reactors are currently generating mostly electricity rather than new fuel because the abundance and low price of mined and reprocessed uranium oxide makes breeding uneconomical, but they can switch to breed new fuel and close the cycle as needed. The CANDU reactor, which was designed to be fueled with natural uranium, is capable of using spent fuel from Light Water Reactors as fuel, since it contains more fissile material than natural uranium. Research into "DUPIC" – direct use of PWR spent fuel in CANDU type reactors – is ongoing and could increase the usability of fuel without the need for reprocessing.

==== Fast breeder ====
A fast breeder, in addition to consuming uranium-235, converts fertile uranium-238 into plutonium-239, a fissile fuel. Fast breeder reactors are more expensive to build and operate, including the reprocessing, and could only be justified economically if uranium prices were to rise to pre-1980 values in real terms. In addition to considerably extending the exploitable fuel supply, these reactors have an advantage in that they produce less long-lived transuranic wastes, and can consume nuclear waste from current light water reactors, generating energy in the process.

Uranium turned out to be far more plentiful than anticipated, and the price of uranium declined rapidly (with an upward blip in the 1970s). This is why the United States halted their use in 1977, and the UK abandoned the idea in 1994. Significant technical and materials problems were encountered with FBRs, and geological exploration showed that scarcity of uranium was not going to be a concern for some time. By the 1980s, due to both factors, it was clear that FBRs would not be commercially competitive with existing light water reactors. The economics of FBRs still depend on the value of the plutonium fuel which is bred, relative to the cost of fresh uranium.

At higher uranium prices breeder reactors may be economically justified. Many nations have ongoing breeder research programs. China, India, and Japan plan large scale use of breeder reactors during the coming decades. 300 reactor-years experience has been gained in operating them.

==== Thermal breeder ====
Fissile uranium can be produced from thorium in thermal breeder reactors. Thorium is three times more plentiful than uranium. Thorium-232 is in itself not fissile, but it can be made into fissile uranium-233 in a breeder reactor. In turn, the uranium-233 can be fissioned, with the advantage that smaller amounts of transuranics are produced by neutron capture, compared to uranium-235 and especially compared to plutonium-239.

Despite the thorium fuel cycle having a number of attractive features, development on a large scale can run into difficulties, mainly due to the complexity of fuel separation and reprocessing. Advocates for liquid core and molten salt reactors such as LFTR claim that these technologies negate the above-mentioned thorium's disadvantages present in solid-fueled reactors.

The first successful commercial reactor at the Indian Point Energy Center in Buchanan, New York, (Indian Point Unit 1) ran on thorium. The first core did not live up to expectations.

== Production ==
The 10 countries responsible for 94% of all uranium extraction.

Uranium production is highly concentrated. The world's top uranium producers in 2017 were Kazakhstan (39% of world production), Canada (22%) and Australia (10%). Other major producers include Namibia (6.7%), Niger (6%), and Russia (5%). Uranium production in 2017 was 59,462 tonnes, 93% of the demand. The balance came from inventories held by utilities and other fuel cycle companies, inventories held by governments, used reactor fuel that has been reprocessed, recycled materials from military nuclear programs and uranium in depleted uranium stockpiles.

== Demand ==
World consumption of primary energy by energy type in terawatt-hours (TWh)

World annual commercial reactor-related uranium requirements amounted to around 60,100 tonnes as of January 2021.

As some countries are not able to supply their own needs of uranium economically, countries have resorted to importing uranium ore from elsewhere. For example, owners of U.S. nuclear power reactors bought 67 million pounds (30 kt) of natural uranium in 2006. Out of that 84%, or 56 million pounds (25 kt), were imported from foreign suppliers, according to the Energy Department.

Because of the improvements in gas centrifuge technology in the 2000s, replacing former gaseous diffusion plants, cheaper separative work units have enabled the economic production of more enriched uranium from a given amount of natural uranium, by re-enriching tails ultimately leaving a depleted uranium tail of lower enrichment. This has somewhat lowered the demand for natural uranium.

=== Demand forecasts ===
According to Cameco Corporation, the demand for uranium is directly linked to the amount of electricity generated by nuclear power plants. Currently, reactor capacity is growing slowly and reactors are being run more productively, with higher capacity factors and reactor power levels. Improved reactor performance translates into greater uranium consumption.

Nuclear power stations of 1000 megawatt electrical generation capacity require around 200 tonnes (440×10^{3} lb) of natural uranium per year. For example, the United States has 103 operating reactors with an average generation capacity of 950 MWe demanded over 22 kilotonnes (49×10^{6} lb) of natural uranium in 2005. As the number of nuclear power plants increases, so does the demand for uranium.

As nuclear power plants take a long time to build and refuelling is undertaken at sporadic, predictable intervals, uranium demand is rather predictable in the short term. It is also less dependent on short-term economic boom–bust cycles as nuclear power has one of strongest fixed costs to variable costs ratios (i.e. the marginal costs of running, rather than leaving idle an already constructed power plant are very low, compared to the capital costs of construction) and it is thus nearly never advisable to leave a nuclear power plant idle for economic reasons. However, nuclear policy can lead to short term fluctuations in demand, as evidenced by the German nuclear phaseout, which was decided upon by the government of Gerhard Schröder (1998–2005) reversed during the second Merkel cabinet (2009–2013) only for a reversal of that reversal to occur as a consequence of the Fukushima nuclear accident, which also led to the temporary shutdown of several German nuclear power plants.

== Prices ==
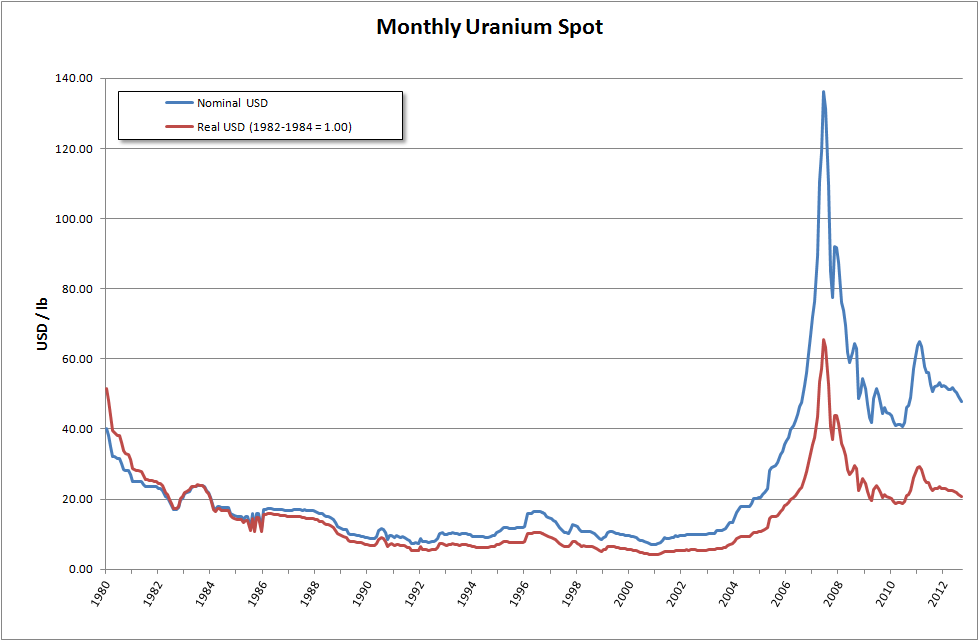
Uranium prices can fluctuate widely, which has an effect on mining companies

Generally speaking, in the case of nuclear energy the cost of fuel has the lowest share in total energy costs of all fuel consuming energy forms (i.e. Fossil fuels, biomass and nuclear). Furthermore, given the immense energy density of nuclear fuel (particularly in the form of enriched uranium or high grade plutonium), it is easy to stockpile amounts of fuel material to last several years at constant consumption. Power plants that do not have online refuelling capabilities, as is the case for the vast majority of commercial power plants in operation, will refuel as seldom as possible to avoid costly downtime and usually plan refuelling shutdowns long in advance so as to allow maintenance and inspection to use the scheduled downtime as well. As such power plant operators tend to have long-term contracts with fuel suppliers that are – if at all – only minorly affected by the fluctuations of uranium prices. The effect on electricity price for end consumers is negligible even in countries like France, which derive a majority of their electric energy from nuclear power. Nonetheless, short term price developments like the 2007 uranium bubble can have drastic effects on mining companies, prospection and the economic calculations as to whether a certain deposit is worthwhile for commercial purposes.

Since 1981 uranium prices and quantities in the US are reported by the Department of Energy. The import price dropped from 32.90 US$/lb-U_{3}O_{8} in 1981 down to 12.55 in 1990 and to below 10 US$/lb-U_{3}O_{8} in the year 2000. Prices paid for uranium during the 1970s were higher, 43 US$/lb-U_{3}O_{8} is reported as the selling price for Australian uranium in 1978 by the Nuclear Information Centre. Uranium prices reached an all-time low in 2001, costing US$7/lb, but in April 2007 the price of Uranium on the spot market rose to US$113.00/lb, a high point of the uranium bubble of 2007. This was very close to the all time high (adjusted for inflation) in 1977.

Following the 2011 Fukushima nuclear disaster, the global uranium sector remained depressed with the uranium price falling more than 50%, declining share values, and reduced profitability of uranium producers since March 2011 and into 2014. As a result, uranium companies worldwide are reducing costs, and limiting operations. As an example, Westwater Resources (previously Uranium Resources), has had to cease all uranium operations due to unfavorable prices. Since then, Westwater has tried branching out into other markets, namely lithium and graphite.

As of July 2014, the price of uranium concentrate remained near a five-year low, the uranium price having fallen more than 50% from the peak spot price in January 2011, reflecting the loss of Japanese demand following the 2011 Fukushima nuclear disaster. As a result of continued low prices, in February 2014 mining company Cameco deferred plans to expand production from existing Canadian mines, although it continued work to open a new mine at Cigar Lake. Also in February 2014, Paladin energy suspended operations at its mine in Malawi, saying that the high-cost operation was losing money at current prices.

=== Effect of price on mining and nuclear power plants ===
In general short term fluctuations in the price of uranium are of more concern to operators and owners of mines and potentially lucrative deposits than to power plant operators. Due to its high energy density, uranium is easy to stockpile in the form of strategic reserves and thus a short term increase in prices can be compensated by accessing those reserves. Furthermore, many countries have de facto reserves in the form of reprocessed uranium or depleted uranium which still contain a share of fissile material that can make re-enrichment worthwhile if market conditions call for it. Nuclear reprocessing of spent fuel is – as of the 2020s – done commercially primarily to use the fissile material still contained in spent fuel. The commonly employed PUREX process recovers uranium and plutonium which can then be converted into MOX-fuel for use in the same light water reactors that produced the spent fuel. Whether reprocessing is economical is subject to much debate and depends in part on assumptions as to the price of uranium and the cost of disposal via deep geological repository or nuclear transmutation. Reactors that can run on natural uranium consume less mined uranium per unit of power produced but can have higher capital costs to build due to the need for heavy water as moderator. Furthermore they need to be capable of online refueling because the burnup achievable with natural uranium is lower than that achievable with enriched uranium – having to shut down the entire reactor for every refueling would quickly make such a reactor uneconomic. Breeder reactors also become more economical as uranium prices rise and it was among other things a decline in uranium prices in the 1970s that led to a decline in interest in breeder reactor technology. The thorium fuel cycle is a further alternative if and when uranium prices remain at a sustained high level and consequently interest in this alternative to current "mainstream" light water reactor technology is dependent in no small part on uranium prices.

== Legality ==
Uranium mining is illegal in a number of jurisdictions. As uranium is often mined incidental to other minerals a ban in practice typically means that uranium is buried again at the mine after initial extraction.

Country/Territory	State / Province	Status	Notes
Australia	New South Wales	Illegal	banned in 1986. Prospecting is legal.
Australia	Victoria	Illegal	banned
Australia	South Australia	legal	one of the world's largest sources
Australia	Tasmania	legal	no active mines
Australia	Queensland	Illegal	banned
Australia	Northern Territory	legal	a long history of uranium mining
Australia	Western Australia	Illegal	ban lifted in 2008, reinstated in 2017
Indonesia	everywhere	legal	ban lifted
Greenland	everywhere	Illegal	banned in 2021
New Zealand	everywhere	Illegal	banned in 1996
United States of America	Virginia	Illegal	banned in 1982
Kyrgyzstan	everywhere	Illegal	banned in 2019
Kazakhstan	everywhere	legal	a major producer

== Politics ==
In March 1951, the United States Atomic Energy Commission (AEC) set a high price for uranium ore. The resultant uranium rush attracted many prospectors to the Southwest. Charles Steen made a significant discover near Moab, Utah, while Paddy Martinez made another near Grants, New Mexico. However, by the 1960s, the United States, USSR, France and China were reducing their acquisitions of uranium. The United States started enriching only uranium mined within its country, but by 1965, production had dropped by 40 percent. By 1971, in an attempt to stop further reductions in prices, mining executives from UCAN, Nufcor, Rio Tinto, and government representatives agreed to share the market with Canadians getting 33.5 percent, South Africa 23.75 percent, France 21.75 percent, Australia 17 percent, and Rio Tinto Zinc 4 percent. By 1974, this market share agreement ended as uranium prices rose in concert with energy prices due to OPEC boycotts, and the United States ending its trade ban of foreign uranium.

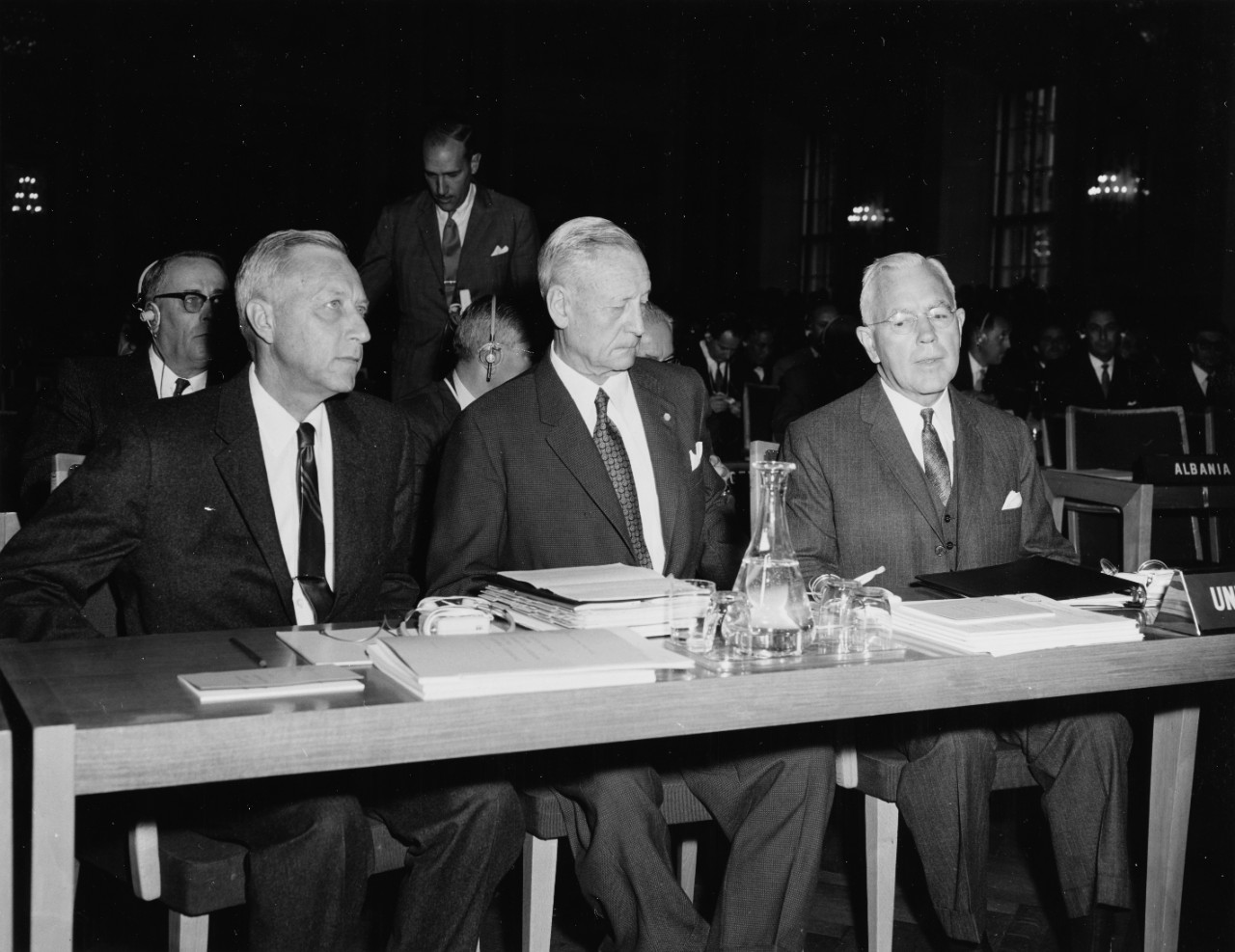
U.S. Delegates at the Fourth General Conference of the International Atomic Energy Agency in Vienna, Austria, 1960

In Europe a mixed situation exists. Considerable nuclear power capacities have been developed, notably in Belgium, Finland, France, Germany, Spain, Sweden, Switzerland, and the UK. In many countries development of nuclear power has been stopped and phased out by legal actions. In Italy the use of nuclear power was barred by a referendum in 1987; this is now under revision. Ireland in 2008 also had no plans to change its non-nuclear stance.

The years 1976 and 1977 saw uranium mining become a major political issue in Australia, with the Ranger Inquiry (Fox) report opening up a public debate about uranium mining. The Movement Against Uranium Mining group was formed in 1976, and many protests and demonstrations against uranium mining were held. Concerns relate to the health risks and environmental damage from uranium mining. Notable Australian anti-uranium activists have included Kevin Buzzacott, Jacqui Katona, Yvonne Margarula, and Jillian Marsh.

The World Uranium Hearing was held in Salzburg, Austria, in September 1992. Anti-nuclear speakers from all continents, including indigenous speakers and scientists, testified to the health and environmental problems of uranium mining and processing, nuclear power, nuclear weapons, nuclear tests, and radioactive waste disposal. People who spoke at the 1992 hearing include: Thomas Banyacya, Katsumi Furitsu, Manuel Pino and Floyd Red Crow Westerman. They highlighted the threat of radioactive contamination to all peoples, especially indigenous communities, and said that their survival requires self-determination and emphasis on spiritual and cultural values. Increased renewable energy commercialization was advocated.

The Kingdom of Saudi Arabia with the help of China has built an extraction facility to obtain uranium yellowcake from uranium ore. According to Western officials with information regarding the extraction site, the process is conducted by the oil-rich kingdom to champion nuclear technology. However, Saudi Energy Minister denied having built a uranium ore facility and claimed that the extraction of minerals is a fundamental part of the kingdom's strategy to diversify its economy.

Despite sanctions on Russia some countries still buy its uranium in 2022, and some argue the EU should stop. As of 2022 S&P Global say non-Russian miners await more certainty before deciding whether to invest in new mines.

== Health risks ==
Uranium ore emits radon gas. The health effects of high exposure to radon are a particular problem in the mining of uranium; significant excess lung cancer deaths have been identified in epidemiological studies of uranium miners employed in the 1940s and 1950s.

The first major studies with radon and health occurred in the context of uranium mining, first in the Joachimsthal region of Bohemia and then in the Southwestern United States during the early Cold War. Because radon is a product of the radioactive decay of uranium, underground uranium mines may have high concentrations of radon. Many uranium miners in the Four Corners region contracted lung cancer and other pathologies as a result of high levels of exposure to radon in the mid-1950s. The increased incidence of lung cancer was particularly pronounced among Navajo and Mormon (who generally have low rates of lung cancer) miners. This is in part due to the religious prohibition on smoking in Mormonism. Safety standards requiring expensive ventilation were not widely implemented or policed during this period. While radon exposure is the main source of lung cancer in non-smokers who aren't exposed to asbestos, there is evidence that the combination of smoking and radon exposure increases the risk above the combined risks of either harmful substance.

In studies of uranium miners, workers exposed to radon levels of 50 to 150 picocuries of radon per liter of air (2000–6000 Bq/m^{3}) for about 10 years have shown an increased frequency of lung cancer. Statistically significant excesses in lung cancer deaths were present after cumulative exposures of less than 50 WLM. There is unexplained heterogeneity in these results (whose confidence intervals do not always overlap). The size of the radon-related increase in lung cancer risk varied by more than an order of magnitude between the different studies.

Since that time, ventilation and other measures have been used to reduce radon levels in most affected mines that continue to operate. The power to detect any excess risks in miners nowadays is likely to be small, exposures being much smaller than in the early years of mining. Coal mining in addition to other health risks can also expose miners to radon as uranium (and its decay product radon) are often found in and near coal deposits and can accumulate underground as radon is denser than air.

In the USA, the Radiation Exposure Compensation Act provides compensation to sufferers of various health problems linked to radiation exposure, or to their surviving relatives. Uranium miners, uranium mill workers and uranium transport workers have been compensated under the scheme.

=== United States clean-up efforts ===
Despite efforts made in cleaning up uranium sites, significant problems stemming from the legacy of uranium development still exist today on the territory of the Navajo Nation and in the states of Utah, Colorado, New Mexico, and Arizona. Hundreds of abandoned mines have not been cleaned up and present environmental and health risks in many communities. At the request of the U.S. House Committee on Oversight and Government Reform in October 2007, and in consultation with the Navajo Nation, the Environmental Protection Agency (EPA), along with the Bureau of Indian Affairs (BIA), the Nuclear Regulatory Commission (NRC), the Department of Energy (DOE), and the Indian Health Service (IHS), developed a coordinated Five-Year Plan to address uranium contamination. Similar interagency coordination efforts are beginning in the State of New Mexico as well. In 1978, Congress passed the Uranium Mill Tailings Radiation Control Act (UMTRCA), a measure designed to assist in the cleanup of 22 inactive ore-processing sites throughout the southwest. This also included constructing 19 disposal sites for the tailings, which contain a total of 40 million cubic yards of low-level radioactive material. The Environmental Protection Agency estimates that there are 4000 mines with documented uranium production, and another 15,000 locations with uranium occurrences in 14 western states, most found in the Four Corners area and Wyoming.

The Uranium Mill Tailings Radiation Control Act is a United States environmental law that amended the Atomic Energy Act of 1954 and gave the Environmental Protection Agency the authority to establish health and environmental standards for the stabilization, restoration, and disposal of uranium mill tailings. Title 1 of the Act required the EPA to set environmental protection standards consistent with the Resource Conservation and Recovery Act, including groundwater protection limits; the Department of Energy to implement EPA standards and provide perpetual care for some sites; and the Nuclear Regulatory Commission to review cleanups and license sites to states or the DOE for perpetual care. Title 1 established a uranium mill remedial action program jointly funded by the federal government and the state. Title 1 of the Act also designated 22 inactive uranium mill sites for remediation, resulting in the containment of 40 million cubic yards of low-level radioactive material in UMTRCA Title 1 holding cells.

== Peak uranium ==
Peak uranium is the point in time that the maximum global uranium production rate is reached. Predictions of peak uranium differ greatly. Pessimistic predictions of future high-grade uranium production operate on the thesis that either the peak has already occurred in the 1980s or that a second peak may occur sometime around 2035. Optimistic predictions claim that the supply is far more than demand and do not predict peak uranium.

As of 2017, identified uranium reserves recoverable at US$130/kg were 6.14 million tons (compared to 5.72 million tons in 2015). At the rate of consumption in 2017, these reserves are sufficient for slightly over 130 years of supply. The identified reserves as of 2017 recoverable at US$260/kg are 7.99 million tons (compared to 7.64 million tons in 2015).

The expected amount of usable uranium for nuclear power that is recoverable depends greatly on how it is used. The main factor is the nuclear technology: light-water reactors, which comprise the great majority of reactors today, only consume about 0.5% of their uranium fuel, leaving over 99% of it as spent fuel waste. Fast breeder reactors instead consume closer to 99% of uranium fuel. Another factor is the ability to extract uranium from seawater. About 4.5 billion tons of uranium are available from seawater at about 10 times the current price of uranium with current extraction technology, which is about a thousand times the known uranium reserves. The Earth's crust contains approximately 65 trillion tons of uranium, of which about 32 thousand tons flow into oceans per year via rivers, which are themselves fed via geological cycles of erosion, subduction and uplift. The ability to extract uranium from seawater economically would therefore make uranium a renewable resource in practice.

Uranium can also be bred from thorium (which is itself 3–4 times as abundant as uranium) in certain breeder reactors, although there are currently no commercially practical thorium reactors in the world and their development would require substantial financial investment which is not justified given the current low prices of natural uranium.

Thirteen countries have hit peak and exhausted their economically recoverable uranium resources at current prices according to the Energy Watch Group.

In a similar manner to every other natural metal resource, for every tenfold increase in the cost per kilogram of uranium, there is a three-hundredfold increase in available lower quality ores that would then become economical. The theory could be observed in practice during the uranium bubble of 2007 when an unprecedented price hike led to investments in the development of uranium mining of lower quality deposits, which mostly became stranded assets after uranium prices returned to a lower level.

=== Uranium supply ===
There are around 40 trillion tons of uranium in Earth's crust, but most is distributed at low parts per million trace concentration over its 3×10^{19} ton mass. Estimates of the amount concentrated into ores affordable to extract for under $130/kg can be less than a millionth of that total.

One highly criticized life cycle study by Jan Willem Storm van Leeuwen suggested that below 0.01–0.02% (100–200 ppm) in ore, the energy required to extract and process the ore to supply the fuel, operate reactors and dispose properly comes close to the energy gained by using the uranium as a fissible material in the reactor. Researchers at the Paul Scherrer Institute who analyzed the Jan Willem Storm van Leeuwen paper, however, have detailed the number of incorrect assumptions of Jan Willem Storm van Leeuwen that led them to this evaluation, including their assumption that all the energy used in the mining of Olympic Dam is energy used in the mining of uranium, when that mine is predominantly a copper mine and uranium is produced only as a co-product, along with gold and other metals. The report by Jan Willem Storm van Leeuwen also assumes that all enrichment is done in the older and more energy intensive gaseous diffusion technology, whereas the less energy intensive gas centrifuge technology has produced the majority of the world's enriched uranium now for a number of decades.

In the early days of the nuclear industry, uranium was thought to be very scarce, so a closed fuel cycle would be needed. Fast breeder reactors would be needed to create nuclear fuel for other power producing reactors. In the 1960s, new discoveries of reserves and new uranium enrichment techniques allayed these concerns. An appraisal of nuclear power by a team at MIT in 2003, and updated in 2009, stated that:

Most commentators conclude that a half century of unimpeded growth is possible, especially since resources costing several hundred dollars per kilogram (not estimated in the Red Book) would also be economically usable ... We believe that the world-wide supply of uranium ore is sufficient to fuel the deployment of 1000 reactors over the next half century.

==== Production ====
According to Robert Vance of the OECD's Nuclear Energy Agency, the world production rate of uranium has already reached its peak in 1980, amounting to 69,683 tonnes (150×10^{6} lb) of U_{3}O_{8} from 22 countries. However, this is not due to lack of production capacity. Historically, uranium mines and mills around the world have operated at about 76% of total production capacity, varying within a range of 57% and 89%. The low production rates have been largely attributable to excess capacity. Slower growth of nuclear power and competition from secondary supply significantly lowere demand for freshly mined uranium. Secondary supplies include military and commercial inventories, enriched uranium tails, reprocessed uranium and mixed oxide fuel.

According to data from the International Atomic Energy Agency, world production of mined uranium has peaked twice in the past: once, circa 1960 in response to stockpiling for military use, and again in 1980, in response to stockpiling for use in commercial nuclear power. Up until about 1990, the mined uranium production was in excess of consumption by power plants. But since 1990, consumption by power plants has outstripped the uranium being mined; the deficit being made up by liquidation of the military (through decommissioning of nuclear weapons) and civilian stockpiles. Uranium mining has increased since the mid-1990s, but is still less than the consumption by power plants.

==== Primary sources ====
Various agencies have tried to estimate how long uranium primary resources will last, assuming a once-through cycle. The European Commission said in 2001 that at the current level of uranium consumption, known uranium resources would last 42 years. When added to military and secondary sources, the resources could be stretched to 72 years. Yet this rate of usage assumes that nuclear power continues to provide only a fraction of the world's energy supply. If electric capacity were increased six-fold, then the 72-year supply would last just 12 years. The world's present measured resources of uranium, economically recoverable at a price of US$130/kg according to the industry groups Organisation for Economic Co-operation and Development (OECD), Nuclear Energy Agency (NEA) and International Atomic Energy Agency (IAEA), are enough to last for "at least a century" at current consumption rates. According to the World Nuclear Association, yet another industry group, assuming the world's current rate of consumption at 66,500 tonnes of uranium per year and the world's present measured resources of uranium (4.7–5.5 Mt) are enough to last for some 70–80 years.

=== Predictions ===
There have been numerous predictions of peak uranium in the past. In 1943, Alvin M. Weinberg et al. believed that there were serious limitations on nuclear energy if only ^{235}U were used as a nuclear power plant fuel. They concluded that breeding was required to usher in the age of nearly endless energy. In 1956, M. King Hubbert declared world fissionable reserves adequate for at least the next few centuries, assuming breeding and reprocessing would be developed into economical processes. In 1975 the US Department of the Interior, Geological Survey, distributed the press release "Known US Uranium Reserves Won't Meet Demand". It was recommended that the US not depend on foreign imports of uranium.

==== Pessimistic predictions ====
Panel from All-Atomic Comics (1976) citing pessimistic uranium supply predictions as an argument against nuclear power.

Many analysts predicted a uranium peak and exhaustion of uranium reserves in the past or the near future. Edward Steidle, Dean of the School of Mineral Industries at Pennsylvania State College, predicted in 1952 that supplies of fissionable elements were too small to support commercial-scale energy production. Michael Meacher, the former environment minister of the UK (1997–2003), reports that peak uranium happened in 1981. He also predicts a major shortage of uranium sooner than 2013 accompanied with hoarding and its value pushed up to the levels of precious metals. M. C. Day projected in 1975 that uranium reserves could run out as soon as 1989, but, more optimistically, would be exhausted by 2015. Jan Willem Storm van Leeuwen, an independent analyst with Ceedata Consulting, contends that supplies of the high-grade uranium ore required to fuel nuclear power generation will, at current levels of consumption, last to about 2034. Afterwards, he expects the cost of energy to extract the uranium will exceed the price the electric power provided. The Energy Watch Group has calculated that, even with steep uranium prices, uranium production will have reached its peak by 2035 and that it will only be possible to satisfy the fuel demand of nuclear plants until then.

Various agencies have tried to estimate how long these resources will last. The European Commission said in 2001 that at the current level of uranium consumption, known uranium resources would last 42 years. When added to military and secondary sources, the resources could be stretched to 72 years. Yet this rate of usage assumes that nuclear power continues to provide only a fraction of the world's energy supply. If electric capacity were increased six-fold, then the 72-year supply would last just 12 years. According to the industry groups OECD, NEA and IAEA, the world's present measured resources of uranium, economically recoverable at a price of US$130/kg, are enough to last for 100 years at current consumption. According to the Australian Uranium Association, another industry group, assuming the world's current rate of consumption at 66,500 tonnes of uranium per year and the world's present measured resources of uranium (4.7 Mt) are enough to last for 70 years.

==== Optimistic predictions ====
All the following references claim that the supply is far more than demand. Therefore, they do not predict peak uranium. In his 1956 paper, M. King Hubbert wrote that nuclear energy would last for the "foreseeable future". Hubbert's study assumed that breeder reactors would replace light water reactors and that uranium would be bred into plutonium (and possibly thorium would be bred into uranium). He also assumed that economic means of reprocessing would be discovered. For political, economic and nuclear proliferation reasons, the plutonium economy never materialized. Without it, uranium is used up in a once-through process and will peak and run out much sooner. However, at present, it is generally found to be cheaper to mine new uranium out of the ground than to use reprocessed uranium, and therefore the use of reprocessed uranium is limited to only a few nations.

The OECD estimates that with the world nuclear electricity generating rates of 2002, with LWR, once-through fuel cycle, there are enough conventional resources to last 85 years using known resources and 270 years using known and as yet undiscovered resources. With breeders, this is extended to 8,500 years.

If one is willing to pay $300/kg for uranium, there is a vast quantity available in the ocean. It is worth noting that since fuel cost only amounts to a small fraction of nuclear energy total cost per kWh, and raw uranium price also constitutes a small fraction of total fuel costs, such an increase on uranium prices would not involve a very significant increase in the total cost per kWh produced.

In 1983, physicist Bernard Cohen proposed that uranium is effectively inexhaustible, and could therefore be considered a renewable source of energy. He claims that fast breeder reactors, fueled by naturally replenished uranium extracted from seawater, could supply energy at least as long as the sun's expected remaining lifespan of five billion years. While uranium is a finite mineral resource within the earth, the hydrogen in the sun is finite too – thus, if the resource of nuclear fuel can last over such time scales, as Cohen contends, then nuclear energy is every bit as sustainable as solar power or any other source of energy, in terms of sustainability over the time scale of life surviving on this planet. His paper assumes extraction of uranium from seawater at the rate of 16 kilotonnes (35×10^{6} lb) per year of uranium. The current demand for uranium is near 70 kilotonnes (150×10^{6} lb) per year; however, the use of breeder reactors means that uranium would be used at least 60 times more efficiently than today.

James Hopf, a nuclear engineer writing for American Energy Independence in 2004, believes that there is several hundred years' supply of recoverable uranium even for standard reactors. For breeder reactors, "it is essentially infinite".

The IAEA estimates that using only known reserves at the current rate of demand and assuming a once-through nuclear cycle that there is enough uranium for at least 100 years. However, if all primary known reserves, secondary reserves, undiscovered and unconventional sources of uranium are used, uranium will be depleted in 47,000 years. Kenneth S. Deffeyes estimates that if one can accept ore one tenth as rich then the supply of available uranium increases 300 times. His paper shows that uranium concentration in ores is log-normal distributed. There is relatively little high-grade uranium and a large supply of very low grade uranium. Ernest Moniz, a professor at the Massachusetts Institute of Technology and the former United States Secretary of Energy, testified in 2009 that an abundance of uranium had put into question plans to reprocess spent nuclear fuel. The reprocessing plans dated from decades previous, when uranium was thought to be scarce. But now, "roughly speaking, we've got uranium coming out of our ears, for a long, long time".

=== Possible effects and consequences ===
As uranium production declines, uranium prices would be expected to increase. However, the price of uranium makes up only 9% of the cost of running a nuclear power plant, much lower than the cost of coal in a coal-fired power plant (77%), or the cost of natural gas in a gas-fired power plant (93%).

Uranium is different from conventional energy resources, such as oil and coal, in several key aspects. Those differences limit the effects of short-term uranium shortages, but most have no bearing on the eventual depletion. Some key features are:

- The uranium market is diverse, and no country has a monopoly influence on its prices.
- Thanks to the extremely high energy density of uranium, stockpiling of several years' worth of fuel is feasible.
- Significant secondary supplies of already mined uranium exist, including decommissioned nuclear weapons, depleted uranium tails suitable for reenrichment, and existing stockpiles.
- Vast amounts of uranium, roughly 800 times the known reserves of mined uranium, are contained in extremely dilute concentrations in seawater.
- Introduction of fast neutron reactors would increase the uranium use efficiency by about 100 times.

=== Substitutes ===
An alternative to uranium is thorium, which is three times more common than uranium. Fast breeder reactors are not needed. Compared to conventional uranium reactors, thorium reactors using the thorium fuel cycle may produce about 40 times the amount of energy per unit of mass. However, creating the technology, infrastructure and know-how needed for a thorium-fuel economy is uneconomical at current and predicted uranium prices.

== See also ==
- Botanical prospecting for uranium
- Energy development
- Energy security
- Isotopes of uranium
- List of uranium projects
- Nuclear fuel cycle
- Uranium metallurgy
- Uranium mining in France
- Uranium tile
- Uranium in the environment
- Uranium mining debate
- World energy supply and consumption
- Nuclear fuel cycle in France
