= Nuclear power as sustainable energy =

Ongoing debate on whether nuclear power is renewable

Whether nuclear power should be considered a form of sustainable energy or renewable energy is an ongoing subject of debate. Legal definitions of renewable energy usually exclude nuclear energy technologies, with the notable exception of the U.S. state of Utah. Dictionary-sourced definitions of renewable energy technologies often omit or explicitly exclude mention of nuclear energy sources, with an exception made for the natural nuclear decay heat generated within the Earth.

The most common fuel used in conventional nuclear fission power stations, uranium-235 is "non-renewable" according to the United States' Energy Information Administration, the organization, however, is silent on the recycled MOX fuel. The National Renewable Energy Laboratory does not mention nuclear power in its "energy basics" definition.

In 1987, the Brundtland Commission (WCED) classified fission reactors that produce more fissile nuclear fuel than they consume (breeder reactors, and if developed, fusion power) among conventional renewable energy sources, such as solar power and hydropower. The monitoring and storage of radioactive waste products is also required upon the use of other renewable energy sources, such as geothermal energy.

== Definitions of renewable energy ==
Renewable energy alternatives graphic

Renewable energy flows involve natural phenomena, which with the exception of tidal power, ultimately derive their energy from the sun (a natural fusion reactor) or from geothermal energy, which is heat derived in greatest part from that which is generated in the earth from the decay of radioactive isotopes. Renewable energy resources exist over wide geographical areas, in contrast to other energy sources, which are concentrated in a limited number of countries.

== Fission fuel supply ==
In 1987, the World Commission on Environment and Development (WCED), an organization independent from, but created by, the United Nations, published Our Common Future, in which a particular subset of presently operating nuclear fission technologies, and nuclear fusion were both classified as renewable. That is, fission reactors that produce more fissile fuel than they consume – breeder reactors – and, when it is developed, fusion power, are both classified within the same category as conventional renewable energy sources, such as solar and falling water.

To fulfill the conditions required for a nuclear renewable energy concept, one has to explore a combination of processes going from the front end of the nuclear fuel cycle to the fuel production and the energy conversion using specific fluid fuels and reactors, as reported by Degueldre et al. (2019). Extraction of uranium from a diluted fluid ore such as seawater has been studied in various countries worldwide. This extraction should be carried out parsimoniously, as suggested by Degueldre (2017). An extraction rate of kilotons of uranium per year over centuries would not modify significantly the equilibrium concentration of uranium in the oceans (3.3 ppb). This equilibrium results from the input of 10 kilotons of uranium per year by river waters and its scavenging on the sea floor from the 1.37 exatons of water in the oceans. For renewable uranium extraction, the use of a specific biomass material is suggested to adsorb uranium and subsequently other transition metals. The uranium loading on the biomass would be around 100 mg per kg. After contact time, the loaded material would be dried and burned (CO_{2} neutral) with heat conversion into electricity. The uranium 'burning' in a molten salt fast reactor helps to optimize the energy conversion by burning all actinide isotopes with an excellent yield for producing a maximum amount of thermal energy from fission and converting it into electricity. This optimisation can be reached by reducing the moderation and the fission product concentration in the liquid fuel/coolant. These effects can be achieved by using a maximum amount of actinides and a minimum amount of alkaline/earth alkaline elements, yielding a harder neutron spectrum. Under these optimal conditions, the consumption of natural uranium would be 7 tons per year per gigawatt of produced electricity.

The coupling of uranium extraction from the sea and its optimal utilisation in a molten salt fast reactor should allow nuclear energy to gain the label renewable. In addition, the amount of seawater used by a nuclear power plant to cool the last coolant fluid and the turbine would be about 2.1 gigatons per year for a fast molten salt reactor, corresponding to 7 tons of natural uranium extractable per year. This practice justifies the label 'renewable'.

=== Conventional fission ===
Proportions of the isotopes U-238 (blue) and U-235 (red) found in natural uranium, versus grades that are enriched. Light water reactors and the natural uranium capable CANDU reactors are primarily powered only by the U-235 component, failing to extract much energy from U-238, while by contrast uranium breeder reactors mostly use U-238 (the primary constituent of natural uranium) as their fuel.

Nuclear fission reactors are a natural energy phenomenon, having naturally formed on Earth in the past. For example, a natural nuclear fission reactor in present-day Oklo, Gabon was discovered in the 1970s. It ran for a few hundred thousand years, averaging 100 kW of thermal power during that time.

Conventional manmade nuclear fission power stations largely use uranium, a common metal found in seawater and rocks around the world, as its primary fuel source. Uranium-235 "burnt" in conventional reactors, without fuel recycling, is a non-renewable resource, and if used at present rates would eventually be exhausted.

This is similar to geothermal energy derived from the natural nuclear decay of the large but finite supply of uranium, thorium, and potassium-40 present within the Earth's crust. Due to nuclear decay, this renewable energy source will eventually run out of fuel. The Sun's energy will too be exhausted.

=== Breeder reactors ===
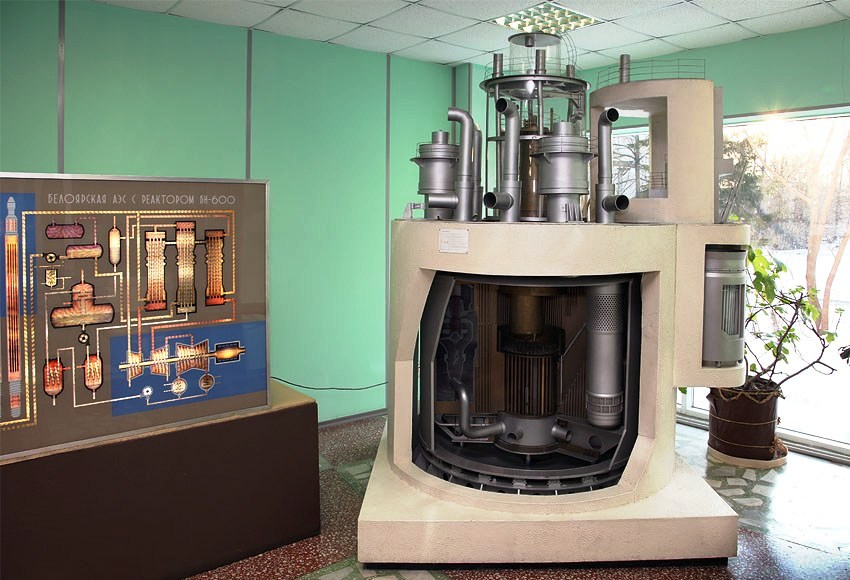
A cutaway model of the second most powerful presently operating fast breeder reactor in the world, the BN-600. At 600 MW of nameplate capacity it is equivalent in power output to a natural gas CCGT. It dispatches 560 MW to the Middle Urals power grid. Construction of a second breeder reactor, the BN-800 reactor, was completed in 2014.

Nuclear fission involving breeder reactors, a reactor which breeds more fissile fuel than they consume and thereby has a breeding ratio for fissile fuel higher than 1, has a stronger case for being considered a renewable resource than conventional fission reactors. Breeder reactors would constantly replenish the available supply of nuclear fuel by converting fertile materials, such as uranium-238 and thorium, into fissile isotopes of plutonium or uranium-233, respectively. Fertile materials are also nonrenewable, but their supply on Earth is extremely large, with a supply timeline greater than geothermal energy. In a closed nuclear fuel cycle utilizing breeder reactors, nuclear fuel could therefore be considered renewable.

In 1983, physicist Bernard Cohen claimed that fast breeder reactors, fueled exclusively by natural uranium extracted from seawater, could supply energy at least as long as the sun's expected remaining lifespan of five billion years. This was based on calculations involving the geological cycles of erosion, subduction, and uplift, leading to humans consuming half of the total uranium in the Earth's crust at an annual usage rate of 6500 tonnes, which was enough to produce approximately ten times the world's 1983 electricity consumption, and would reduce the concentration of uranium in the seas by 25%, resulting in an increase in the price of uranium of less than 25%.

Advancements at Oak Ridge National Laboratory and the University of Alabama, as published in a 2012 issue of the American Chemical Society, towards the extraction of uranium from seawater have focused on increasing the biodegradability of the materials used reducing the projected cost of the metal if it was extracted from the sea on an industrial scale. The researchers' improvements include using electrospun Shrimp shell Chitin mats that are more effective at absorbing uranium when compared to the prior record-setting Japanese method of using plastic amidoxime nets. As of 2013 only a few kilograms of uranium have been extracted from the ocean in pilot programs and it is also believed that the uranium extracted on an industrial scale from the seawater would constantly be replenished from uranium leached from the ocean floor, maintaining the seawater concentration at a stable level. In 2014, with the advances made in the efficiency of seawater uranium extraction, a paper in the Journal of Marine Science & Engineering suggests that with, light water reactors as its target, the process would be economically competitive if implemented on a large scale. In 2016 the global effort in the field of research was the subject of a special issue in the journal of Industrial & Engineering Chemistry Research.

As of 2022, only two breeder reactors are producing industrial quantities of electricity, the BN-600 and BN-800. The retired French Phénix reactor also demonstrated a breeding ratio greater than 1 and operated for about 30 years, producing power when Our Common Future was published in 1987.

== Fusion fuel supply ==
If it is developed, fusion power would provide more energy for a given weight of fuel than any fuel-consuming energy source currently in use. The fuel itself (primarily deuterium) exists abundantly in the Earth's ocean: about 1 in 6500 hydrogen (H) atoms in seawater (H_{2}O) is deuterium in the form of semi-heavy water. Although this may seem a low proportion (about 0.015%), because nuclear fusion reactions are so much more energetic than chemical combustion and seawater is easier to access and more plentiful than fossil fuels, fusion could potentially supply the world's energy needs for millions of years.

In the deuterium + lithium fusion fuel cycle, 60 million years is the estimated supply lifespan of this fusion power, if it is possible to extract all the lithium from seawater, assuming current (2004) world energy consumption. While in the second easiest fusion power fuel cycle, the deuterium + deuterium burn, assuming all of the deuterium in seawater was extracted and used, there is an estimated 150 billion years of fuel, with this again, assuming current (2004) world energy consumption.

== Legislation in the United States ==
If nuclear power were classified as renewable energy (or as low-carbon energy), additional government support would be available in more jurisdictions, and utilities could include nuclear power in their effort to comply with the renewable portfolio standard.

In 2009, the State of Utah passed the "Renewable Energy Development Act", which in part defined nuclear power as a form of renewable energy. In North Carolina, the Senate Bill 678 was passed for fusion energy to be added as a renewable source for clean energy.

== See also ==
- Life-cycle greenhouse gas emissions of energy sources
- Low-carbon electricity
- Non-renewable resource#Nuclear fuels
- Uranium mining
- Nuclear power debate
- Pro-nuclear movement
- 100% renewable energy
