= Active fuel length =

Active fuel length is the length of the fuel material in a fuel element. This is the Total rod length minus the plenum length and end plugs.

The fuel element or assembly is arranged in an array of cells or bundles. Each bundle consists of multiple fuel rods or pins. Each fuel rod is composed of several cylindrical fuel pellets of enriched uranium, typically as UO_{2} inserted into zirconium-alloy tubes. Each reactor core can be loaded with multiple bundles of these reactor bundles.

== See also ==
- Nuclear fuel
- Nuclear reactor
- Nuclear reactor technology
- Nuclear fuel cycle
- Uranium market
- Reprocessed uranium
- Nuclear physics
- Nuclear reactor physics
