= Uranium market =

Commodity market

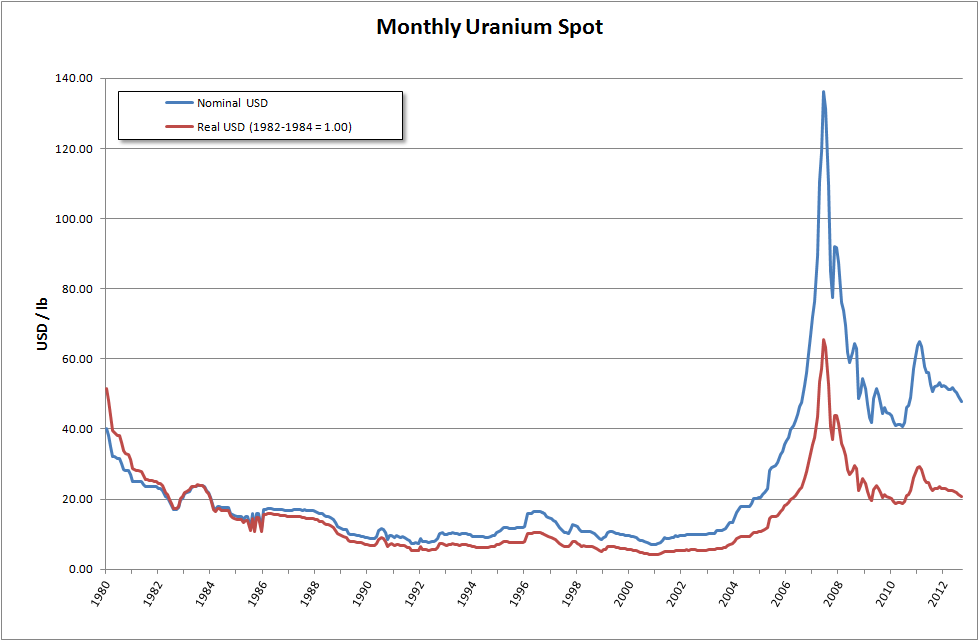
Monthly uranium spot price in US$ per pound. The 2007 price peak is clearly visible.

The uranium market, like all commodity markets, has a history of volatility, moving with the standard forces of supply and demand as well as geopolitical pressures. It has also evolved particularities of its own in response to the unique nature and use of uranium.

Historically, uranium has been mined in countries willing to export, including Australia and Canada. However, countries now responsible for more than 50% of the world’s uranium production include Kazakhstan, Namibia, Niger, and Uzbekistan.

Uranium from mining is used almost entirely as fuel for nuclear power plants. Following the 2011 Fukushima nuclear disaster, the global uranium market has remained depressed, with the uranium price falling by more than 50%, declining share values, and reduced profitability for uranium producers since March 2011. As a result, uranium companies worldwide have reduced capacity, closed operations and deferred new production.

Before uranium is ready for use as nuclear fuel in reactors, it must undergo a number of intermediary processing steps that are identified as the front end of the nuclear fuel cycle: mining it (either by ISL or by mining and milling into yellowcake); enriching it; and finally fuel fabrication to produce fuel assemblies or bundles.

== History ==
Uranium production is highly concentrated. The world's top uranium producers in 2017, representing 71% of total production, were Kazakhstan (39% of world production), Canada (22%) and Australia (10%). Other major producers included Niger, Namibia and Russia. Initial treatment facilities to produce uranium oxide are almost always located at or near the mining sites. The facilities for enrichment, on the other hand, are found in those countries that produce significant amounts of electricity from nuclear power. Large commercial enrichment plants are in operation in France, Germany, Netherlands, UK, United States, and Russia, with smaller plants elsewhere.

Global demand for uranium rose steadily from the end of World War II, largely driven by nuclear weapons procurement programs.

In the 1960s, the United States' Energy Agency banned the use of foreign uranium in American reactors, and the country significantly reduced the price of its uranium exports. This resulted in oversupply of uranium in the rest of the world.

In June 1972, the major non-United States uranium producers formed a secret cartel to manipulate the market. The cartel (Societe d'Etudes de Recherches d'Uranium) was composed of Australia, France, South Africa, and Anglo-Australian transnational Rio Tinto Zinc Ltd. The cartel sought to mitigate the impacts of US policy on the market by engaging in bid rigging, price fixing, and market sharing. Westinghouse filed an antitrust lawsuit against cartel members in 1976 and the cartel disbanded.

In the 1980s and continuing into the 1990s, uranium demand decreased as fewer nuclear power plants were built. Factors for the decreased demand included the end of the Cold War (which in turn resulted in the increased availability of secondary sources of uranium), the disasters at Chernobyl and Three Mile Island. Another factor was the construction of a series of large hydro-electric power stations has also helped to depress the global market since the early 1970s. This phenomenon can be traced back to the construction of the vast Aswan Dam in Egypt. During this time, large uranium inventories accumulated. Until 1985 the Western uranium industry was producing material much faster than nuclear power plants and military programs were consuming it. The spot price for uranium fell, leaving the price below $10 per pound for yellowcake by year-end 1989.

With the price of uranium low, investment in uranium mining decreased. The uranium market was a buyers market over the periods 1980 to 1994 and 1998 to 2003.

Beginning in 2001, uranium prices rebounded and continued to increase through the uranium bubble of 2007. Factors resulting in this price increase included decreased availability of secondary sources of uranium, a flood at the Cigar Lake Mine in Canada, new reactors beginning operations, and the announcements of China's plans to expand its nuclear power generation. During the mid-2007 uranium bubble, the price of uranium peaked at around US$137/lb, the highest price (adjusted for inflation) in 25 years.

Uranium demand and prices decreased during the 2008 financial crisis. Following the shutdown of many nuclear power plants after the Fukushima Daiichi nuclear disaster in 2011, demand fell further to about 60 kilotonnes (130×10^{6} lb) per year.

In 2012 Kazatomprom and Areva were the top two producing companies (with 15% of the production each), followed by Cameco (14%), ARMZ Uranium Holding (13%) and Rio Tinto (9%).

World uranium requirements increased steadily to 65,014 tonnes (140 million pounds) in 2017.

Because of the improvements in gas centrifuge technology in the 2000s, replacing former gaseous diffusion plants, cheaper separative work units have enabled the economic production of more enriched uranium from a given amount of natural uranium, by re-enriching tails ultimately leaving a depleted uranium tail of lower enrichment. This has somewhat lowered the demand for natural uranium.

Several factors are pushing both industrialized and developing nations to seek alternatives to fossil fuels. The increasing rate of consumption of fossil fuel is a concern for nations lacking in reserves, especially non-OPEC nations, as is the pollution produced by coal and gas-burning power plants. On the other hand, it is still difficult to tap economically into the world's vast solar, wind, and tidal energy reserves. Uranium suppliers hope that these factors will drive an increase in uranium production due to demand for nuclear power generation.

== Current market operations ==
The global uranium market has low levels of market coordination and is characterized by regional blocs that operate relatively independent of each other. The global trading of uranium has evolved into two distinct marketplaces shaped by historical and political forces. The first, the western world marketplace, comprises the Americas, Western Europe and Australia. A separate marketplace comprises countries within the former Soviet Union, or the Commonwealth of Independent States (CIS), Eastern Europe and China. Most of the fuel requirements for nuclear power plants in the CIS are supplied from the CIS's own stockpiles. Often producers within the CIS also supply uranium and fuel products to the western world, increasing competition.

The uranium market is not highly institutionalized. As of at least 2023, the uranium market does not have benchmark pricing negotiations nor a producers' marketing cartel. Unlike many other metals, uranium is not traded on an organized commodity exchange such as the London Metal Exchange. Instead it is traded in most cases through contracts negotiated directly between a buyer and a seller. In 2007, however, the New York Mercantile Exchange announced a 10-year agreement to provide for the trade of on and off exchange uranium futures contracts.

The structure of uranium supply contracts varies widely. Pricing can be as simple as a single fixed price, or based on various reference prices with economic corrections built in. Contracts traditionally specify a base price, such as the uranium spot price, and rules for escalation. In base-escalated contracts, the buyer and seller agree on a base price that escalates over time on the basis of an agreed-upon formula, which may take economic indices, such as GDP or inflation factors, into consideration.

A spot market contract usually consists of just one delivery and is typically priced at or near the published spot market price at the time of purchase. However 85% of all uranium has been sold under long-term, multi-year contracts with deliveries starting one to three years after the contract is made. Long-term contract terms range from 2–10 years, but they typically run for 3–5 years, with the first delivery due within 24 months of contract award. They may also include a clause that allows the buyer to vary the size of each delivery within prescribed limits. For example, delivery quantities may vary from the prescribed annual volume by ±15%.

One of the peculiarities of the nuclear fuel cycle is the way in which utilities with nuclear power plants buy their fuel. Instead of buying fuel bundles from the manufacturer, the usual approach is to purchase uranium in all of these intermediate forms. Typically, a fuel buyer from power utilities will contract separately with suppliers at each step of the process. Sometimes, the fuel buyer may purchase enriched uranium product, the end product of the first three stages, and contract separately for fabrication, the fourth step to eventually obtain the fuel in a form that can be loaded into the reactor. The utilities believe—rightly or wrongly—that these options offer them the best price and service. They will typically retain two or three suppliers for each stage of the fuel cycle, who compete for their business by tender. Sellers consist of suppliers in each of the four stages as well as brokers and traders. There are fewer than 100 companies that buy and sell uranium in the western world.

In 2010, China became the world's largest importer of uranium and has continued to be as of at least 2023. China's uranium procurement approach includes investment in foreign mining operations. Chinese investment in Kazakhstan mines have contributed to Kazakhstan's current position as the world's largest exporter of uranium.

== Available supply ==
The Estimate of Available Uranium depends on what resources are included in the estimate. The squares represent relative sizes of different estimates, whereas the numbers at the lower edge show how long the given resource would last at present consumption. ██ Reserves in current mines ██ Known economic reserves ██ Conventional undiscovered resources ██ Total ore resources at 2004 prices ██ Unconventional resources (at least 4 billion tons, could last for millennia)

In 1983, physicist Bernard Cohen proposed that the world supply of uranium is effectively inexhaustible, and could therefore be considered a form of renewable energy. He noted that fast breeder reactors, fueled by naturally-replenished uranium extracted from seawater, could supply energy at least as long as the Sun's expected remaining lifespan of five billion years. These reactors would use uranium-238, which is more abundant than the uranium-235 required by conventional reactors.

As of 2015, total identified uranium resources were sufficient for more than a century of supply based on current requirements.

== See also ==
- List of countries by uranium production
- List of countries by uranium reserves
- Uranium mining
- List of uranium mines
- Used nuclear fuel
- Reprocessed uranium
- Special nuclear material
- Megatons to Megawatts Program
- Uranium bubble of 2007
- Uranium Participation Corporation
- Depression glass
- Uranium tile
- Peak uranium
