= Jan Willem Storm van Leeuwen =

Dutch energy scientist

Jan Willem Storm van Leeuwen (born 1941, Dutch East Indies) is a consultant in chemistry and energy systems. Storm van Leeuwen received his Master of Science, physical chemistry, at the Technical University Eindhoven. He is a senior scientist at Ceedata Consultants. He also develops courses for chemistry teachers for the Open University at Heerlen. He is the secretary of the Dutch Association of the Club of Rome. His two fields of expertise are technology assessment and life cycle analyses of energy systems, focussed on sustainability aspects. He published numerous reports and articles on various topics related to energy and environment, also in peer-reviewed scientific journals.

== Nuclear energy study ==
He is best known for the paper Nuclear power the energy balance that he wrote with Philip Smith (also named Stormsmith studies), where they analyzed the energy payback from the entire nuclear power system. The energy inputs were calculated based on various assumptions and guesses about the technologies used in uranium production, rather than actually measuring them. They concluded that the major parameter determining the energy balance was the grade of the uranium ore, and ore grades lower than 180 ppm do not yield an energy gain when used in the nuclear fuel cycle.

The study was heavily criticized, such as a rebuttal by researchers from the Paul Scherrer Institute. With further criticism from Sevior and Flitney who issued the following statement:

We compared the predicted energy cost [using Storm van Leeuwen's study] of Uranium mining and milling for Ranger, Olympic Dam and Rössing to the energy consumption as reported. All are significantly over predicted (5 PJ, 60 PJ and 69 PJ vs 0.8 PJ, 5 PJ and 1 PJ respectively). [...]

The energy consumption is predicted to be so large that is comparable to the energy consumption of a particular sub-section of the economy. In the case of Rössing, the over prediction is larger than the energy consumption of the entire country of Namibia.

Storm van Leeuwen noted that :

The method of Sevior and Flitney based on financial data appears to me full of hidden assumptions, bookkeeping problems, statistical pitfalls and uncertainties.

The paper has been used by anti-nuclear organizations to claim that nuclear power is not clean enough to be considered a part of a clean energy mix.

== Other papers ==
Storm van Leeuwen also presented his previous work as part of another non-peer reviewed controversial paper "Secure Energy? Civil Nuclear Power, Security and Global Warming", published by a think tank, the Oxford Research Group, an institute unaffiliated with Oxford University, in which it argues nuclear power is not a long-term reducer of greenhouse gas emissions.

His original results has been used in a study - Life cycle energy and greenhouse gas emissions of nuclear energy: A review. Energy Conversion and Management - with several modifications.

Storm van Leeuwen is recognized by Open Democracy as one of their notable authors.

== Personal life ==
Storm van Leeuwen lives in Chaam with his wife, the artist Pien Storm van Leeuwen.

== See also ==
- Environmental effects of nuclear power
- Peak uranium
- Helen Caldicott
