= Thomas Neff =

American physicist (1943–2024)

- Born: Thomas Lee Neff; September 25, 1943; Lake Oswego, Oregon, U.S.
- Died: July 11, 2024 (aged 80)
- Education: Stanford University
- Occupation: Physicist

Thomas Lee Neff (September 25, 1943 – July 11, 2024) was an American physicist. He played a major role in the Megatons to Megawatts Program that dismantled thousands of nuclear warheads.

== Life and career ==
Neff was born in Lake Oswego, Oregon on September 25, 1943. He attended Stanford University.

As a post-doc, he was an assistant to American Physical Society President Wolfgang "Pief" Panofsky and helped write legislation that created the US Department of Energy. He went on to become a professor of physics at the Massachusetts Institute of Technology during the 1990s.

Neff is credited with dreaming up the Megatons to Megawatts Program and selling the idea to the governments of the USA and post-Soviet Russia. Under the program, Russia dismantled many of its nuclear warheads and sold the diluted uranium to the USA to power nuclear reactors. The program solved the problem of how to shrink the USSR's large nuclear weapons stockpile and keep weapons-grade uranium from being sold to America's enemies.

He was a fellow of the American Physical Society. He died on July 11, 2024, at the age of 80.
