= Streltsovsk mine =

- Location: Zabaykalsky Krai, Russia
- Products: uranium

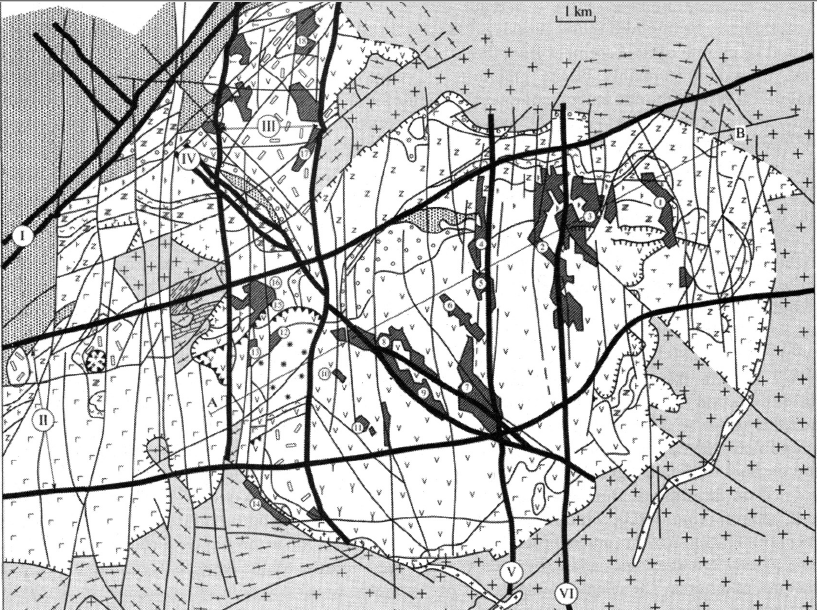
Geological map of the Streltsovskoye Caldera and eighteen uranium mines numbered, where 2 is Streltsovskoye. Roman numerals indicate major tectonic structures, where VI is the Streltsovskoye Fault. The "v" symbol marks massive and fluidal rhyolite and tuff, while "+" marks Variscan granite.

The Streltsovsk mine is a large open pit mine located in the southern part of Russia in Zabaykalsky Krai. Streltsovsk represents one of the largest uranium reserves in Russia having estimated reserves of 64.1 million tonnes of ore grading 0.2% uranium.

The caldera was the result of a peralkaline rhyolite magma eruption within a subalkaline granite.
