= Marenica project =

Uranium mine in Namibia

- Location: Erongo Region, Namibia
- Products: uranium
- Production: 0
- Company: Marenica Minerals (Marenica Energy 75%, Xanthos Mining 20%, Millennium Minerals 5%)

The Marenica project is a modest uranium resource located in the western part of Namibia in Erongo Region. Marenica contains an estimated 22,000 tU of uranium in ore grading 0.008% uranium. Marenica Minerals, which owns the rights to the resource, has put further development on hold while its majority shareholder Marenica Energy ( now Elevate Uranium Limited) seeks to develop and market a process for extracting uranium from low-grade ore.
