= Novokonstantinovka, Blagovarsky District, Republic of Bashkortostan =

Novokonstantinovka Новоконстантиновка
- Selo
- Location within Bashkortostan Location within Russia
- Coordinates: 54°46′N 54°48′E
- Country: Russia
- Region: Bashkortostan
- District: Blagovarsky District
- Time zone: UTC+5:00

Novokonstantinovka (Russian: Новоконстантиновка) is a rural locality (a selo) in Mirnovsky Selsoviet, Blagovarsky District, Bashkortostan, Russia. The population was 176 as of 2010. There are 2 streets.

== Geography ==
Novokonstantinovka is located 25 km northwest of Yazykovo (the district's administrative centre) by road. Troitsky is the nearest rural locality.
