= Uranium bubble of 2007 =

Sharp rise in the price of natural uranium

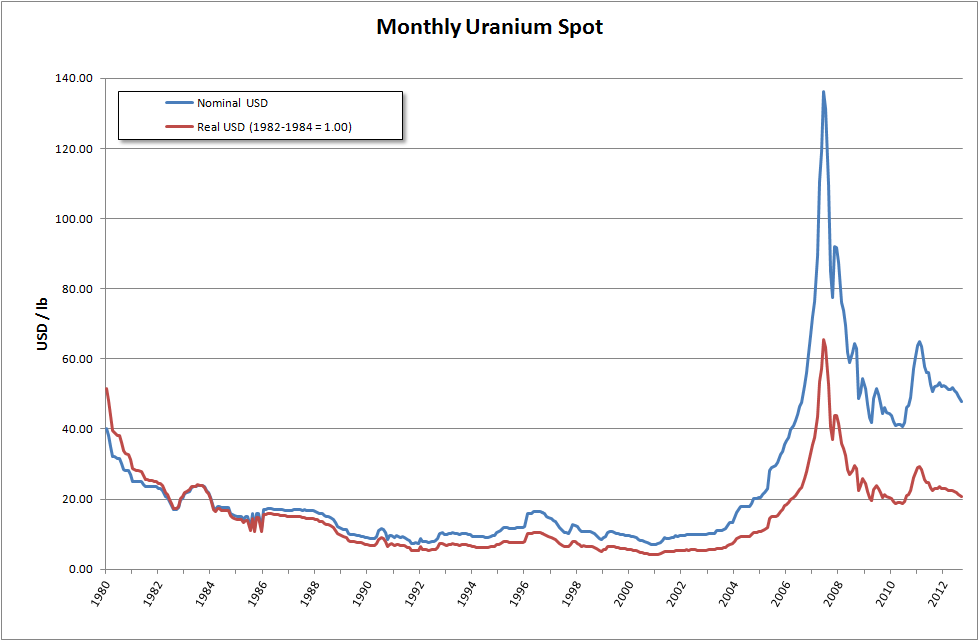
Monthly uranium spot price in USD per pound from 1980 to 2011. The 2007 price peak is clearly visible.

The uranium bubble of 2007 was a period of nearly exponential growth in the price of natural uranium, starting in 2005 and peaking at roughly $300/kg (or ~$135/lb) in mid-2007. This coincided with significant rises of stock price of uranium mining and exploration companies. After mid-2007, the price began to fall again and at the end of 2010, was relatively stable at around $100/kg.

== Causes ==
The upward trend for the prices of uranium was already apparent since 2003. This prompted increases in mining activity. A possible direct cause for the bubble is the flooding of the Cigar Lake Mine, Saskatchewan, which has the largest undeveloped high-grade uranium ore deposits in the world. This created uncertainty about short-term future of the uranium supply. Other factors are speculation triggered by growing expectations around India and China's nuclear programs, and a reduction in available weapons-grade uranium. The bubble coincided with renewed discussions regarding a renaissance of nuclear power.

== Impact ==
The impact of the bubble on nuclear power generation was small, as most power plants have long-term uranium delivery contracts, and the price of natural uranium makes up only a small fraction of their operating cost. However, the sharp fall in prices after mid-2007 caused a lot of new companies focused on exploration and mining to lose their viability and go out of business. Due to increased prospecting, known and inferred reserves of uranium have increased by 15% between 2005 and 2007.

== See also ==
- 2000s commodities boom
- Uranium Participation Corporation
