= Botanical prospecting for uranium =

Botanical prospecting for uranium is a method of finding uranium deposits either by observation of plant life growing on the surface, or by geochemical analysis of plant material in a process known as geobotanical prospecting.

The history of uranium prospecting, especially in the Colorado Plateau of North America, has seen several methods of identifying likely ore body locations. The use of radiation detectors, such as Geiger counters and scintillation counter is one such method. Another method widely used relies on knowledge of the geologic history of an area, such as locating a geologic formation known to host ore deposits.

== United States ==
During the early efforts to locate uranium deposits in the United States, the U.S. Geological Survey conducted studies of prospecting through botanical surveys. These studies examined three methods.

Each method begins with the identification of an area of interest. This area is then gridded off, which allows the prospector to map samples to specific locations on the ground.

=== Plant morphology variations ===
The first method, not widely used in the Colorado Plateau, looks for physiologic and morphologic changes in plants growing in or around ore bodies. A survey of plants in the gridded area is conducted. Comparison of normal growth habits and rates is done with known normal plants, and areas with high rates of change in either physiology or morphology indicate likely spots for further prospecting. This method is time-consuming, and is not useful in all areas.

=== Deep-rooted plants ===
The second method uses a survey of deep-rooted plants in an area of interest. This works because the plant roots carry uranium to the surface, where it is concentrated in growing areas of the plant. Juniper or saltbrush are usually used, as they are known uranium concentrators. Samples of tree branch tips and leaves are taken from each area in the grid. These samples are then sent to a laboratory for analysis. Concentrations of more than 1 part in a million (> 1 ppm) of uranium indicate likely areas to investigate further, through drilling or digging. This method provides information about likely ore bodies down to a depth of between 50 and 70 feet, and is generally good in areas where mineralized beds form broad flat benches, so that a grid pattern can be used.

=== Indicator plant species ===
The third method looks for concentrations of indicator plant species in an area of interest. Some uranium ore bodies contain higher concentrations of certain elements, such as selenium, than the surrounding host rock in which they are found. Certain plants that concentrate these elements act as indicator species for likely ore body locations. Mapping these plants provides information about areas in which further prospecting should be done. For example, in areas such as the Colorado Plateau, various species of Astragalus are selenium concentrators (A. pattersoni, A. preussi, A. thompsonae). Other indicator plants for sulfur and calcium, such as Eriogonum inflatum and Oenothera caespitosa help to identify likely areas also, especially in conjunction with the selenium indicators.

== See also ==
- List of uranium mines
- Phytoremediation
