= Megatons to Megawatts Program =

Arms control agreement between Russia and US

The Megatons to Megawatts Program, also called the United States-Russia Highly Enriched Uranium Purchase Agreement, was an agreement between Russia and the United States whereby Russia converted 500 metric tons of "excess" weapons-grade uranium (enough for 20,000 warheads) into 15,000 metric tons of low enriched uranium, which was purchased by the US for use in its commercial nuclear power plants. The official name of the program is the "Agreement between the Government of the Russian Federation and the Government of the United States of America Concerning the Disposition of Highly-Enriched Uranium Extracted from Nuclear Weapons", dated February 18, 1993. Under this Agreement, Russia agreed to supply the United States with low-enriched uranium (LEU) obtained from high-enriched uranium (HEU) found to be in excess of Russian defense purposes. The United States agreed to purchase the low-enriched uranium fuel.

The original proposal for this program was made by Thomas Neff, a physicist at MIT, in an October 24, 1991 Op-Ed in The New York Times. On August 28, 1992, in Moscow, U.S. and Russian negotiators initialed the 20-year agreement and President George H. W. Bush announced the agreement on August 31, 1992. In 1993, the agreement was signed and initiated by President Bill Clinton and the commercial implementing contract was then signed by both parties. The program was successfully completed in December 2013.

The program was credited for being one of the most successful disarmament programs in history, but its low set price for nuclear fuel caused Western companies to not invest in uranium refining capacity, resulting by 2022 in Russia's government-owned Rosatom becoming the supplier of about 50% of the world's enriched uranium, and 25% of the nuclear fuel used in the US.

== Terms of the program ==
Under this Agreement, the United States and Russia agreed to commercially implement a 20-year program to convert 500 metric tons of HEU (uranium-235 enriched to 90 percent) taken from Soviet-era warheads, into LEU (less than 5 percent uranium-235). The terms of the agreement required that it be implemented on commercial terms without government funds. The agreement named the Department of Energy as the executive agent for the US side. The DOE appointed the newly privatized United States Enrichment Corporation (USEC) as the commercial agent, its executive program contractor. The Russian Federation designated Techsnabexport (TENEX), a commercial subsidiary of its Ministry for Atomic Energy (Minatom), as the agent to implement the program on commercial terms. On January 14, 1994, the commercial contract between USEC and TENEX (HEU-LEU Contract) was signed. The terms also required that the HEU be converted by dilution (downblending) to LEU in Russian nuclear facilities. USEC would then purchase the low-enriched fuel and transport it to its facilities in the US. The first shipment of LEU took place in May 1995.

The value of the process is in two components: the LEU Feed (feed component of natural uranium) and the work involved in the conversion process, measured as separative work units (SWU). Both have separate commercial values. Early disagreements on interpretations of the terms of the governmental and commercial agreements on this issue led to controversy and some delays. Although each shipment contains LEU, the commercial nature of the global uranium market defines the uranium and the enrichment components as separate commercial values and costs. The solution reached was for USEC to continue payments for the SWU component it purchased and also to transfer the equivalent of the LEU feed component to the Russian side. In March 1999, Minatom and the US Department of Energy signed the Agreement Concerning the Transfer of Source Material to the Russian Federation (the Transfer Agreement), and at the same time TENEX signed a Contract with a Group of Western Companies (Cameco, Canada; Cogema, France; Nukem, Germany/US) regarding the purchase of the LEU Feed. As years passed, numerous commercial contract terms were renegotiated and revised to accommodate mutual interests.

== Summary of program ==
The Megatons to Megawatts program was initiated in 1993 and completed on schedule in December 2013. A total of 500 tonnes of Russian warhead grade HEU (equivalent to 20,008 nuclear warheads) were converted in Russia to nearly 15,000 tonnes tons of LEU (low enriched uranium) and sold to the US for use as fuel in American nuclear power plants. The program was the largest and most successful nuclear non-proliferation program to date. The first nuclear power plant to receive low-enriched fuel containing uranium under this program was the Cooper Nuclear Station in 1998. During the 20-year Megatons to Megawatts program, as much as 10 percent of the electricity produced in the United States was generated by fuel fabricated using LEU from Russian HEU.

During this period, on a comparatively modest basis, the US government has also been converting some of its excess nuclear warhead HEU into power plant fuel. Efforts have also been undertaken to demonstrate the commercial feasibility of converting warhead plutonium into fuel to augment nuclear fuel for US power plants.

Nuclear industry sources forecasted high demand trends that would require finding other uranium supply sources after the completion of the Megatons to Megawatts agreement. In 2011, TENEX and USEC signed a long-term contract (Transitional Supply Agreement – TSA) for the provision of enrichment services to the United States that could see annual deliveries after 2015 reaching a level of around half the annual supply volume under the HEU Deal. No plans have been announced for new initiatives similar to the Megatons to Megawatts program.

== After-effects ==
Though the program was cited as one of the most successful disarmament programs, it has been criticized for the low price at which the fuel was sold. The set price made it unprofitable for US and European companies to compete with Russian nuclear fuel, such that by 2022 Russia was the supplier of almost half of the world's enriched uranium, and about one quarter of the nuclear fuel used in the US. This resulted in US companies paying about $1 billion to Rosatom, Russia's government owned nuclear company, and Russian nuclear fuel being exempt from the embargo on other Russian energy products resulting from Russia's invasion of Ukraine. In addition, Bill Gates's nuclear power venture TerraPower's proposed new type of reactors require fuel that today can only be supplied by Rosatom. Uranium refining companies like Urenco are hoping that Western governments will see the importance of domestic supply chains and create legislation to boost their development.

== See also ==
- Nuclear power
- Peak uranium
- Swords into ploughshares
- Peace dividend
