= Bernard Cohen (physicist) =

Bernard Leonard Cohen (June 14, 1924 – March 17, 2012) was Professor Emeritus of Physics at the University of Pittsburgh. Cohen, who was born in Pittsburgh, was a staunch opponent of the so-called linear no-threshold model (LNT) which postulates there exists no safe threshold for radiation exposure. His view has support from a minority. He died in March 2012.

== No-threshold and plutonium toxicity debates ==
Cohen claimed: "All estimates of the cancer risk from low level radiation are based on the linear-no threshold theory (LNT) which is based solely on largely discredited concepts of radiation carcinogenesis, with no experimental verification in the low dose region of the most important applications. These risk estimates are now leading to the expenditure of tens of billions of dollars to protect against dangers whose existence is highly questionable. It is therefore of utmost importance to test the validity of this theory."

A conclusion, with an update to the landmark study published 1995, continues:

Since no other plausible explanation has been found after years of effort by myself and others, I conclude that the most plausible explanation for our discrepancy is that the linear-no threshold theory fails, grossly over-estimating the cancer risk in the low dose, low dose rate region. There are no other data capable of testing the theory in that region.

An easy answer to the credibility of this conclusion would be for someone to suggest a potential not implausible explanation based on some selected variables. I (or he) will then calculate what values of those variables are required to explain our discrepancy. We can then make a judgement on the plausibility of that explanation. To show that this procedure is not unreasonable, I offer to provide a not-implausible explanation for any finding of any other published ecological study. This alone demonstrates that our work is very different from any other ecological study, and therefore deserves separate consideration.

Cohen's debates in academic periodicals and published correspondence with R. William Field, Brian J. Smith (assistant professor of biostatistics, University of Iowa), Jerry Puskin (from the U.S. Environmental Protection Agency), Sarah Darby, and Sir Richard Doll and others regarding his radon-related ecologic studies are well known. Among other expert panels, the World Health Organization's International Agency for Research on Cancer discussed at length Cohen's results then concluded: "The weight of evidence is that the ecological analyses of Cohen can be rejected."

In March, 2011, Professor Cohen stated, reflecting on his study and its controversial results, that low levels of radiation can have beneficial health effects and reduce the risks of cancer:

There is evidence on both sides. Whether low-level radiation is protective against cancer, a theory called radiation hormesis, is debated in the scientific community. Furthermore, ... [on his viewpoint, and its support found in his exhaustive studies] it could go further and say that no confounding factors (like socio-economic, geography, ethnicity, medical care access, and beyond 500 explored in the analysis) can explain the results. However, my study was designed to test the assumption that the danger of radiation is simply proportional to the radiation dose, which is the only evidence that low-level radiation may be harmful. My conclusion was that that assumption is false.

Other scientists disagree and more research has been called for.

Subsequent research would join a profound array of positions including a 1982 United Nations' work-group study – UNSCEAR – concluding: "There appear to be no nonspecific effects from low doses of radiation that result in a shortening of the life span."

In 1983, Cohen proposed that uranium is effectively inexhaustible, and could therefore be considered a renewable source of energy.

== Scholarly achievements ==
Professor Cohen earned his undergraduate degree from Case-Western Reserve University in 1944, his master's degree from the University of Pittsburgh in 1947, and his Ph.D. from Carnegie-Mellon University in 1950. He taught at the University of Pittsburgh from 1958 as Professor of Physics, Adjunct Professor of Chemistry, Adjunct Professor of Chemical and Petroleum Engineering, Adjunct Professor of Radiation Health at the Graduate School of Public Health; there also as Adjunct Professor of Environmental and Occupational Health. He was awarded professor emeritus standing in 1994.

From 1965 to 1978, he was Director of the Scaife Nuclear Laboratory.

A testimony to his conviction on the human safety of background low-level radiation was his offering rewards of up to $10,000 if people provided evidence that the inverse association he found between radon (county averages) and lung cancer (county averages) was due to some factor other than failure of the linear-no threshold theory. Puskin, Smith, Field and others have claimed that his findings are due in part to his inability to control for the inverse association between smoking and radon.

When Ralph Nader described plutonium as "the most toxic substance known to mankind", Cohen, then a tenured professor, offered to consume on camera as much plutonium oxide as Nader could consume of caffeine, the stimulant found in coffee and other beverages, which in its pure form has an oral median lethal dose (LD_{50}) of 192 milligrams per kilogram in rats. Nader did not accept the challenge.

== Publications ==
Professor Cohen has written six books, including Heart of the Atom (1967) with translations in French, German, Italian, and Japanese, Concepts of Nuclear Physics (1970) with translation in Arabic, Nuclear Science and Society (1974), Before It's Too Late: A Scientist's Case for Nuclear Power (1983), and The Nuclear Energy Option, Alternative for the Nineties, (1990) in translation for Japanese and Spanish. He has written about 135 research papers on basic nuclear physics, about 300 scientific papers on energy and environment (e.g. nuclear power, health effects of radiation, radioactive waste, risks in our society), and about 80 articles in popular magazines such as Physics and Society, National Review, Oui, Science Digest, Catholic Digest, and Scientific American. He has authored scientific studies and editorial contributions on a vast array of subjects in nuclear industry trade journals such as Public Utilities Fortnightly, Reviews of Modern Physics, Nuclear Engineering International, and American Journal of Physics.

== Awards and honors ==
Dr. Cohen received in 1981 the Tom W. Bonner Prize in Nuclear Physics from the American Physical Society. He was also elected Chairman of the American Physical Society, Division of Nuclear Physics (1974–75).

Dr. Cohen received the 1992 Distinguished Scientific Achievement Award from the Health Physics Society, and the 1996 Walter H. Zinn Award from the American Nuclear Society (ANS), for his "notable and sustained contribution to the nuclear power industry that has not been widely recognized." The ANS also granted Cohen its 1985 "Public Information Award", and its 1996 "Special Award", for his "meritorious contributions in research" on Linear Dose Model [Versus] Other Models for Critical Dose Values. He was elected to member of the National Academy of Engineering in 2003, "for fundamental contributions to our understanding of low-level radiation" and Chairman of the American Nuclear Society Division of Environmental Sciences (1980–81).
