= RDS-2 Linage =

Range of early Soviet nuclear warheads

The RDS-2 nuclear warhead was created and designed by the Soviet Union during the late 1940s and early 1950s. RDS-2 was first secretly tested on September 24, 1951, at a Soviet test site in Kazakhstan. RDS-2 was a plutonium only device with an estimated yield of 38 kt.

== Leading to the Bomb ==
By the end of the 1940s, the Department of Scientific and Technical Intelligence of NKVD had begun to target nuclear projects in Great Britain, France, and Germany. The Soviet intelligence agency obtained a report by the Maud Committee of Great Britain that analyzed the possibility of a nuclear weapons program gaining traction in Great Britain. However, World War II forced the Soviet Union to shift their efforts towards the war. The Russian Atomic project wouldn't gain traction until early 1943 when physicist Igor V. Kurchatov, the scientific director of the Soviet nuclear project, wrote to secret police chief Lavrenti Beria, whom Joseph Stalin had given principal responsibility for the atomic effort. The nuclear project was approved on February 11, 1943, after inquires with atomic research institutes such as the Institute of Chemical Physics of the Academy of Sciences and other design bureaus that were already developing atomic components and equipment. Nuclear Weapons research and development was carried out by the Minatom's Department of Nuclear Weapons Development and Testing. The department managed six institutes: the Institute of Experimental Physics (Arzamas-16), the Institute of Technical Physics (Chelyabinsk-70), the Institute of Impulse Technologies (VNII IT), and the Design Bureau of Road Transportation Equipment (KB ATO) but Arzamas-16 and Chelyabinsk-70 focused on weapons development. Design Bureau 11 (KB-11) was the primary institute that designed and tested nuclear weapons.

By mid 1949, all physics and engineering problems with Soviet Nuclear project were resolved, manufacturing technologies were completed, weapon design was finalized, and KB-11 finished testing of the bomb and their components. In April 1949, a group led by Khariton and K. I. Shchelkin, was moved to KB-11 to prepare and carry out the first atomic bomb testing in the USSR. The test site was in the Semipalatinsk area in Kazakhstan and at 7:00 am on 29 August 1949, the RDS-1 charge exploded; this marked the successful completion of the development and testing of the first atomic bomb in the USSR and at a yield of 22 kilotons. At 7:00 am on 29 August 1949, the RDS-1 charge exploded; this marked the successful completion of the development and testing of the first atomic bomb in the USSR.

== RDS-2 ==
The RDS-2 bomb was the successor to the RDS-1 bomb, but the RDS-1 atomic weapon relied heavily on the design of Fat Man. However, after the first successful test at KB-11, Russian developers quickly shifted to making improvements to the weapon. Their efforts focused on increasing the bomb's efficiency, yield, and reducing the size and weight. RDS-2 was successfully tested on September 24, 1951, at KB-11. The major improvement to the bomb was a redesigned explosive lens system that allowed the designers to double the yield of RDS-1 and reduce its size and weight.

== RDS-3 ==
Less than a month passed before RDS-3 had an improved design that incorporated a composite uranium-plutonium pit. RDS-3 was also the first Soviet bomb to be dropped from an aircraft on October 18, 1951. The bomb produced a yield of 41.2 kilotons.

== RDS-4 ==
RDS-4, also known as Tatyana, was successfully tested on August 23, 1954. The RDS-4 device was an improved design of the RDS-3. RDS-4's size and weight were reduced by one third and a factor of three. The USSR's first tactical bomb was based on RDS-4 and yielded a 30-kiloton explosion. The bomb became available for development with tactical aviation in 1954 and remained in service until 1966.

== RDS-31 ==
KB-11 continued to make important contributions to the performance of nuclear weapons by developing an external impulse tube neutron initiator. The design of the initiator eliminated the need to frequently replace the polonium-210-beryllium initiators and increased the optimize ignition timing of the chain reaction. Optimizing the ignition timing led to yield increase 1.5-1.7. RSD-31 was a RSD-3 with an external neutron initiator and tested on October 23, 1953, with a yield of 62 kilotons.

== RDS-9 ==
RDS-9 took on a more tactical design than its predecessors. A tactical design meant including a lower yield rate and becoming more compact. RDS-9 was first tested at the Navy test site Novaya Zemlya and was tested at a yield of five kilotons.
