= Totsky =

Totsky (masculine), Totskaya (feminine), or Totskoye (neuter) may refer to:

== Surname ==
- Konstantin Totsky, Russian general, statesman, and diplomat
- Afanasy Totsky, fictional nobleman in the novel The Idiot by Russian writer Dostoyevsky

== Places ==
- Totsky District, a district in Orenburg Oblast, Russia
- Totskoye, a village in Orenburg Oblast, Russia
- Totskoye Vtoroye, a village in Orenburg Oblast, Russia
- Totsky range, a military range, best known as a Soviet nuclear test site
- Lake Totskoye, a lake in Vologda Oblast, Russia
- Totskoye (air base)
