= Soviet atomic bomb project =

Soviet Union program to develop nuclear weapons during and after World War II

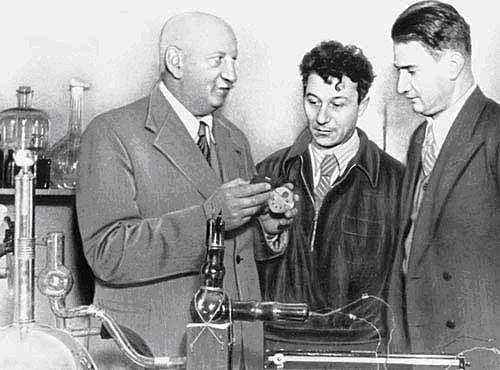
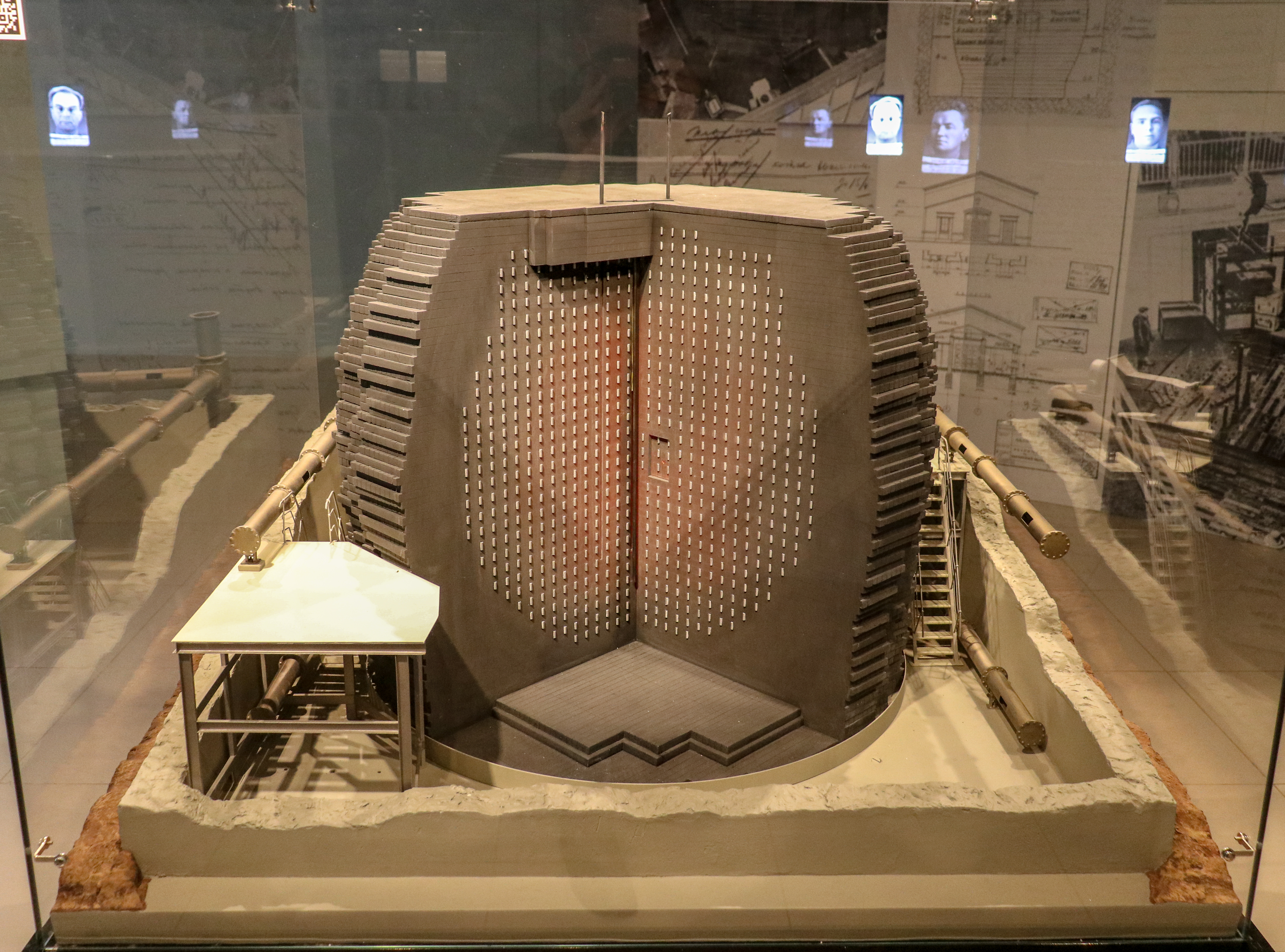
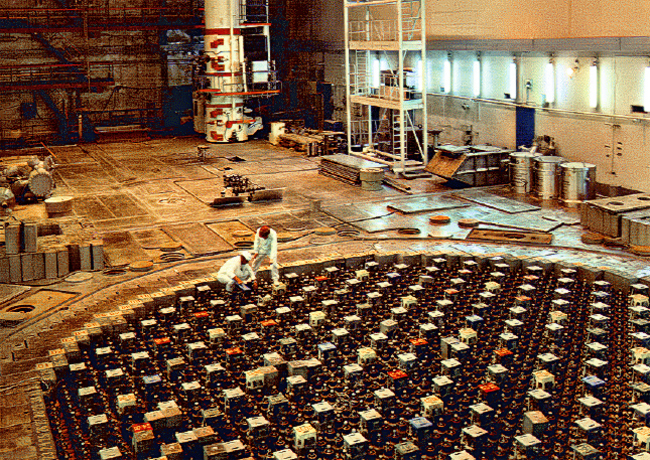
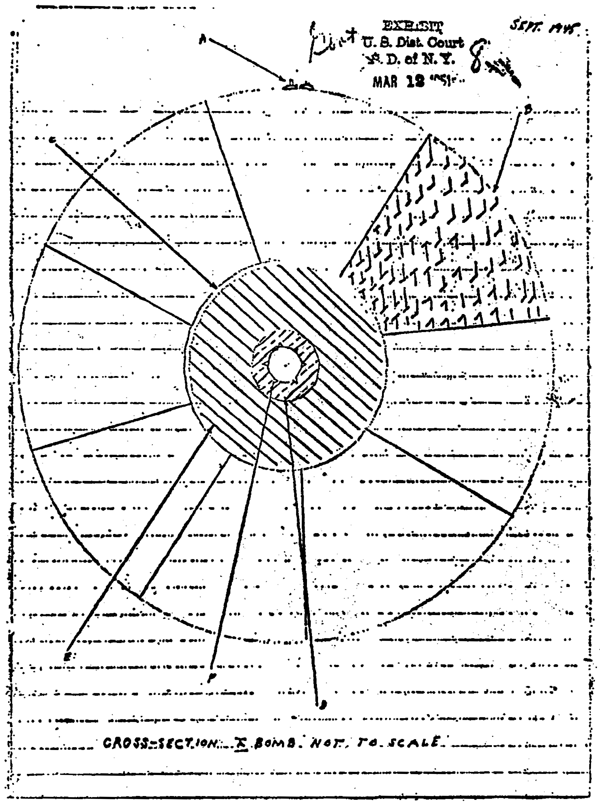
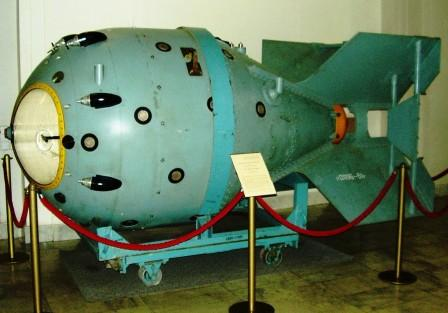
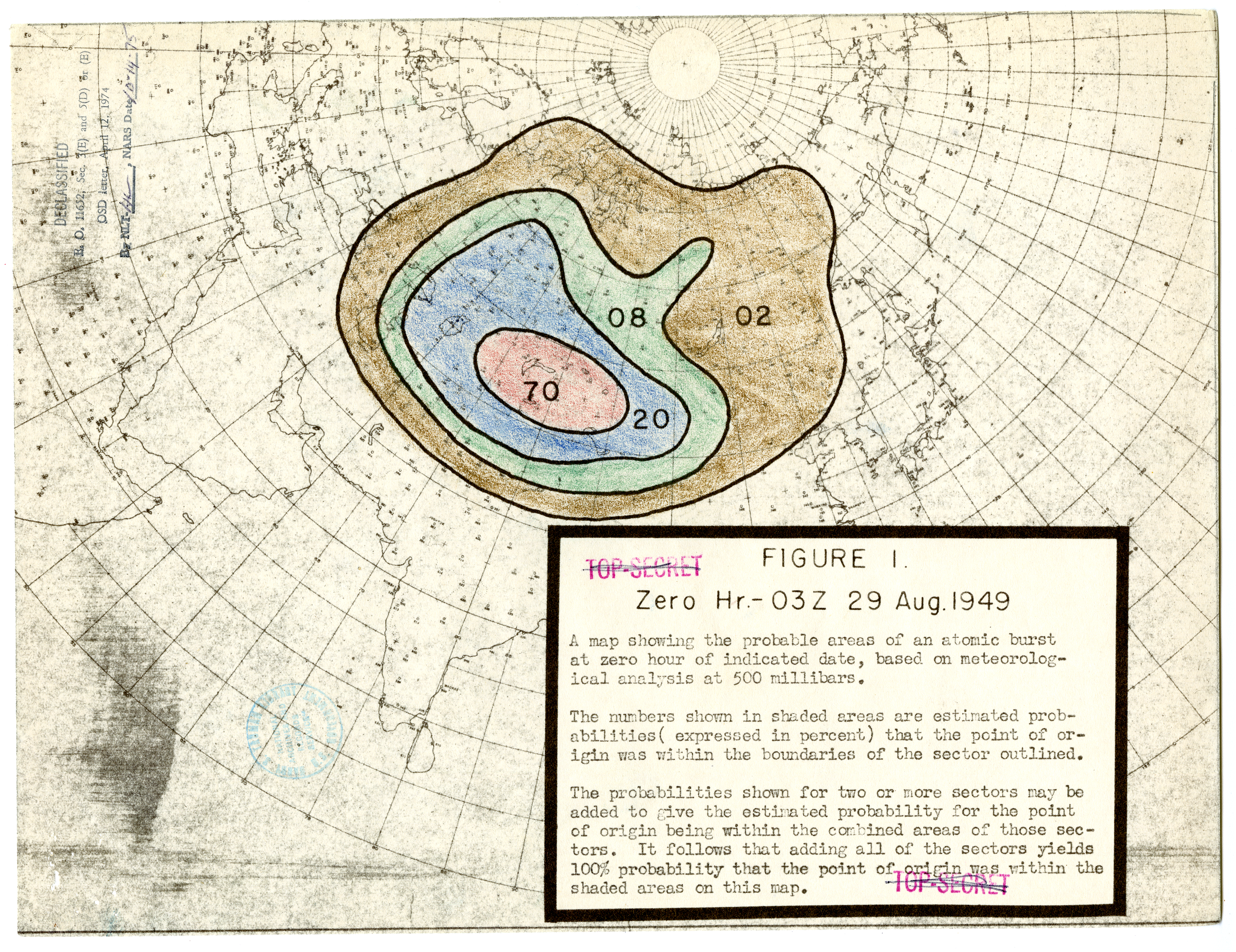
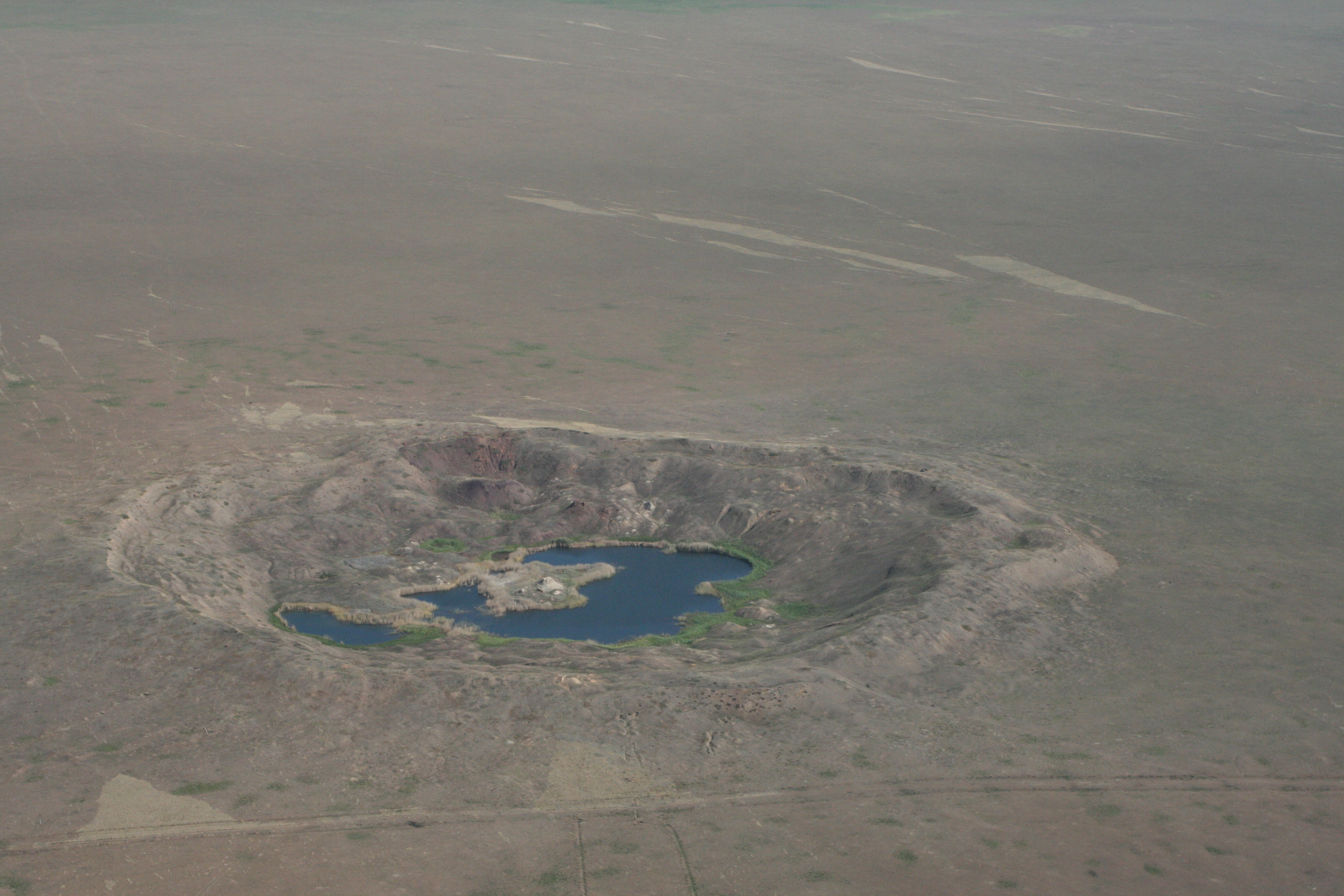
- Abram Ioffe, Abram Alikhanov, and Igor Kurchatov; Model of the F-1 reactor; RBMK reactor similar to Mayak plutonium production reactors; Diagram of an implosion bomb passed by atomic spy David Greenglass; Replica of RDS-1; US estimations of RDS-1 location, 1949; Test crater at the Semipalatinsk Test Site
- Operational scope: Operational R&D
- Location: Kurchatov Institute, Moscow; Design Bureau 11, Arzamas-16; Semipalatinsk Test Site, Kazakhstan
- Planned by: NKVD, NKGB, MGB PGU; GRU
- Date: 1942–1949
- Executed by: Soviet Union
- Outcome: Successful development of a plutonium implosion weapon; United States accelerates development of the hydrogen bomb

The Soviet atomic bomb project was authorized by Joseph Stalin in the Soviet Union to develop nuclear weapons during and after World War II.

Physicist Georgy Flyorov, suspecting a Western Allied nuclear program, urged Stalin to start research in 1942. Early efforts were made at Laboratory No. 2 in Moscow, led by Igor Kurchatov, and by Soviet-sympathizing atomic spies in the US Manhattan Project. Subsequent efforts involved plutonium production at Mayak in Chelyabinsk and weapon research and assembly at KB-11 in Sarov.

After Stalin learned of the atomic bombings of Hiroshima and Nagasaki, the nuclear program was accelerated through intelligence gathering on the US and German nuclear weapon programs. Espionage coups, especially via Klaus Fuchs and David Greenglass, included detailed descriptions of the implosion-type Fat Man bomb and plutonium production. In the final months of the war, the Soviet "Russian Alsos" task force competed against the Western Allies' Alsos Mission to capture German and Austrian nuclear scientists and material, including refined uranium and cyclotrons. The Soviet project utilized East German industry for further uranium mining, refinement, and instrument manufacture. Lavrentiy Beria was placed in charge of the atomic project, and the replication of the Fat Man bomb was prioritized.

The Manhattan Project had established a monopoly on the global uranium market. The Soviet project relied on SAG Wismut in East Germany and the development of the Taboshar mine in Tajikistan. Domestic large-scale production of high purity graphite and high purity uranium metal, to construct plutonium production reactors, was a significant challenge.

In late 1946, F-1, the first nuclear reactor outside North America, achieved criticality at Laboratory No. 2. In mid-1948, the A-1 plutonium production reactor became operational at the Mayak site, and in mid-1949, the first plutonium metal was separated. The first nuclear weapon was assembled at the KB-11 design bureau, led by Yulii Khariton, in the closed city of Arzamas-16 (Sarov).

On 29 August 1949, the Soviet Union secretly conducted its first weapon test, RDS-1, at the Semipalatinsk Test Site of the Kazakh SSR. Simultaneously, project scientists had been developing conceptual thermonuclear weapons. The US detection of the test, via anticipatory atmospheric fallout monitoring, led to a US crash program to develop thermonuclear weapons, opening of the nuclear arms race of the Cold War.

Boosted fission and multi-stage thermonuclear weapons were developed during the 1950s, testing expanded to Novaya Zemlya and Kapustin Yar, and fissile material production sites grew, including the invention of the gas centrifuge. In 1961 and 1962 the program conducted the five most powerful nuclear tests ever; the 1963 Partial Test Ban Treaty moved Soviet nuclear testing underground. The program created demand for nuclear weapons delivery, command and control, and early warning, influencing the Soviet space program. Soviet nuclear weapons played a major role in the Cold War, including the Cuban Missile Crisis, and the Sino-Soviet border conflict.

== Early efforts ==
=== Background origins and roots ===
As early as 1910 in Russia, independent research was being conducted on radioactive elements by several Russian scientists. Despite the hardship faced by the Russian academy of sciences during the national revolution in 1917, followed by the violent civil war in 1922, Russian scientists had made remarkable efforts toward the advancement of physics research in the Soviet Union by the 1930s. Before the first revolution in 1905, the mineralogist Vladimir Vernadsky had made a number of public calls for a survey of Russia's uranium deposits but none were heeded. Such early efforts were independently and privately funded by various organizations until 1922 when the Radium Institute in Petrograd (now Saint Petersburg) opened and industrialized the research.

From the 1920s until the late 1930s, Russian physicists had been conducting joint research with their European counterparts on the advancement of atomic physics at the Cavendish Laboratory run by a New Zealand physicist, Ernest Rutherford, where Georgi Gamov and Pyotr Kapitsa had studied and researched.

Influential research towards the advancement of nuclear physics was guided by Abram Ioffe, who was the director at the Leningrad Physical-Technical Institute (LPTI), having sponsored various research programs at various technical schools in the Soviet Union. The discovery of the neutron by the British physicist James Chadwick further provided promising expansion of the LPTI's program, with the operation of the first cyclotron to energies of over 1 MeV, and the first "splitting" of the atomic nucleus by John Cockcroft and Ernest Walton. Russian physicists began pushing the government, lobbying in the interest of the development of science in the Soviet Union, which had received little interest due to the upheavals created during the Russian revolution and the February Revolution. Earlier research was directed towards the medical and scientific exploration of radium; a supply of it was available as it could be retrieved from borehole water from the Ukhta oilfields.

In 1939, German chemist Otto Hahn reported his discovery of fission, achieved by the splitting of uranium with neutrons that produced the much lighter element barium. This eventually led to the realization among Russian scientists, and their American counterparts, that such reaction could have military significance. The discovery excited the Russian physicists, and they began conducting their independent investigations on nuclear fission, mainly aiming towards power generation, as many were skeptical of the possibility of creating an atomic bomb anytime soon. Early efforts were led by Yakov Frenkel (a physicist specialised on condensed matter), who did the first theoretical calculations on continuum mechanics directly relating the kinematics of binding energy in fission process in 1940. Georgy Flyorov's and Lev Rusinov's collaborative work on thermal reactions concluded that 3–1 neutrons were emitted per fission only days after similar conclusions had been reached by the team of Frédéric Joliot-Curie.

=== World War II and accelerated feasibility ===
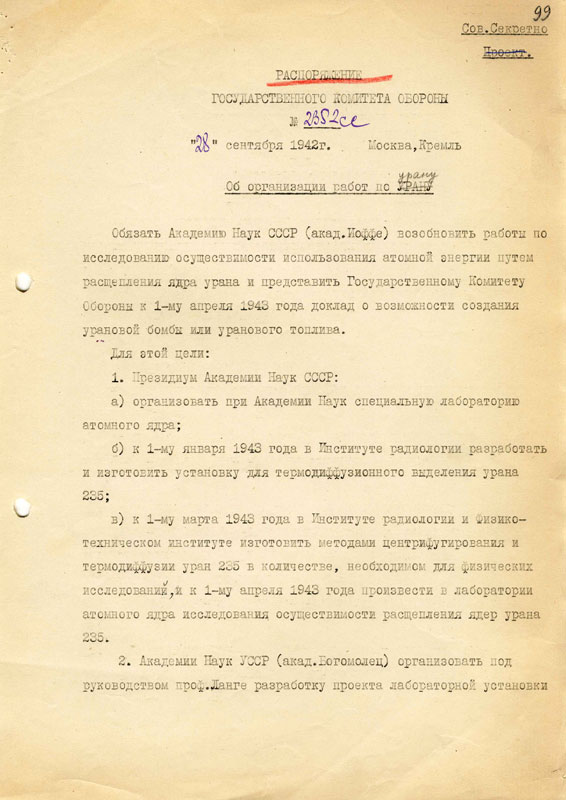
The 1942 Soviet report on the feasibility of uranium titled: Disposition No. 2352: "On the organization of work on uranium.

After a strong lobbying of Soviet scientists, the Soviet government initially set up a commission that was to address the "uranium problem" and investigate the possibility of chain reaction and isotope separation. The Uranium Problem Commission was ineffective because the German invasion of Soviet Union eventually limited the focus on research, as the Soviet Union became engaged in a bloody conflict along the Eastern Front for the next four years. The Soviet atomic weapons program had no significance, and most work was unclassified as the papers were continuously published as public domain in academic journals.

Joseph Stalin, the Soviet leader, had mostly disregarded the atomic knowledge possessed by Soviet scientists as he had most of his available scientists working in the metallurgy and mining industry or serving in the Soviet Armed Forces technical branches during the eastern front in 1940–1942.

In 1940–1942, Georgy Flyorov, a Russian physicist serving as an officer in the Soviet Air Force, noted that despite progress in other areas of physics, the German, British, and American scientists had ceased publishing papers on nuclear science. Clearly, they each had active secret research programs. The dispersal of Soviet scientists had sent Abram Ioffe's Radium Institute from Leningrad to Kazan; and the wartime research program put the "uranium bomb" programme third, after radar and anti-mine protection for ships. Kurchatov had moved from Kazan to Murmansk to work on mines for the Soviet Navy.

In April 1942, Flyorov directed two classified letters to Stalin, warning him of the consequences of the development of atomic weapons: "the results will be so overriding [that] it won't be necessary to determine who is to blame for the fact that this work has been neglected in our country." The second letter, by Flyorov and Konstantin Petrzhak, highly emphasized the importance of a "uranium bomb": "it is essential to manufacture a uranium bomb without a delay."

Upon reading the Flyorov letters, Stalin immediately pulled Soviet physicists from their respective military services and authorized an atomic bomb project, under engineering physicist Anatoly Alexandrov and nuclear physicist Igor V. Kurchatov. For this purpose, the Laboratory No. 2 near Moscow was established under Kurchatov. Kurchatov was chosen in late 1942 as the technical director of the Soviet bomb program; he was awed by the magnitude of the task but was by no means convinced of its utility against the demands of the front. Abram Ioffe had refused the post as he was too old, and recommended the young Kurchatov.

At the same time, Flyorov was moved to Dubna, where he established the Laboratory of Nuclear Reactions, focusing on synthetic elements and thermal reactions. In late 1942, the State Defense Committee officially delegated the program to the Soviet Army, with major wartime logistical efforts later being supervised by Lavrentiy Beria, the head of NKVD.

In 1945, the Arzamas 16 site, near Moscow, was established under Yakov Zel'dovich and Yuli Khariton who performed calculations on nuclear combustion theory, alongside Isaak Pomeranchuk. Despite early and accelerated efforts, it was reported by historians that efforts on building a bomb using weapon-grade uranium seemed hopeless to Soviet scientists. Igor Kurchatov had harboured doubts working towards the uranium bomb, but made progress on a bomb using weapon-grade plutonium after British data was provided by the NKVD.

The situation dramatically changed when the Soviet Union learned of the atomic bombings of Hiroshima and Nagasaki in 1945.

Immediately after the atomic bombing, the Soviet Politburo took control of the atomic bomb project by establishing a special committee to oversee the development of nuclear weapons as soon as possible. On 9 April 1946, the Council of Ministers created KB–11 ('Design Bureau-11') that worked towards mapping the first nuclear weapon design, primarily based on the American approach and detonated with weapon-grade plutonium.

Work on the program was accelerated by constructing a nuclear research reactor near Moscow which went critical for the first time on 25 October 1946. Even while this facility was still in the planning stage, a government commission inspected and approved a location east of the Urals for a plutonium production facility similar to the American Hanford Site, with nuclear production reactor much larger in size than the research reactor, combined with a radiochemical extraction factory. Constructed some fifteen miles east of the small town of Kyshtym, this plutonium production complex came to be known as Chelyabinsk-40 and later still, as Mayak.

The area was chosen in part because of its proximity to the Chelyabinsk Tractor Plant which had merged during the war with the evacuated Kharkov Diesel Works and parts of the Leningrad Kirov Plant into a major tank production complex popularly known as "Tankograd". To supply the complex and dozens of other armament works in the area, a huge new power station had gone up in 1942 from which electricity could be drawn. Chelyabinsk province, particularly around the small town of Kyshtym, was also a major gulag station, with some twelve forced labor camps in the area.

== Organization and administration ==
=== The German assistance ===
From 1941 to 1946, the Soviet Union's Ministry of Foreign Affairs handled the logistics of the atomic bomb project, with Foreign Minister Vyacheslav Molotov controlling the direction of the program. However, Molotov proved to be a weak administrator, and the program stagnated. In contrast to American military administration in their atomic bomb project, the Russians' program was directed by political dignitaries such as Molotov, Lavrentiy Beria, Georgii Malenkov, and Mikhail Pervukhin—there were no military members.

After the atomic bombings of Hiroshima and Nagasaki, the program's leadership changed, when Stalin appointed Lavrentiy Beria on 22 August 1945. Beria is noted for leadership that helped the program to its final implementation.

Beria understood the necessary scope and dynamics of research. This man, who was the personification of evil to modern Russian history, also possessed the great energy and capacity to work. The scientists who met him could not fail to recognize his intelligence, his will power, and his purposefullness. They found him first-class administrator who could carry a job through to completion...

— Yulii Khariton, The First War of Physics: The Secret History of the Atom Bomb, 1939–1949

The new Committee, under Beria, retained Georgii Malenkov and added Nikolai Voznesensky and Boris Vannikov, People's Commissar for Armament. Under the administration of Beria, the NKVD co-opted atomic spies of the Soviet Atomic Spy Ring into the American program, and infiltrated the German nuclear program whose nuclear scientists were later instrumental in attaining the feasibility of Soviet nuclear weapons.

The German assistance and the roles of the German nuclear scientists in advancing the Soviet program is subjected to the controversy as Russians had played down their contributions or passed their research to Russian scientists.

== Espionage ==
=== Soviet atomic ring ===
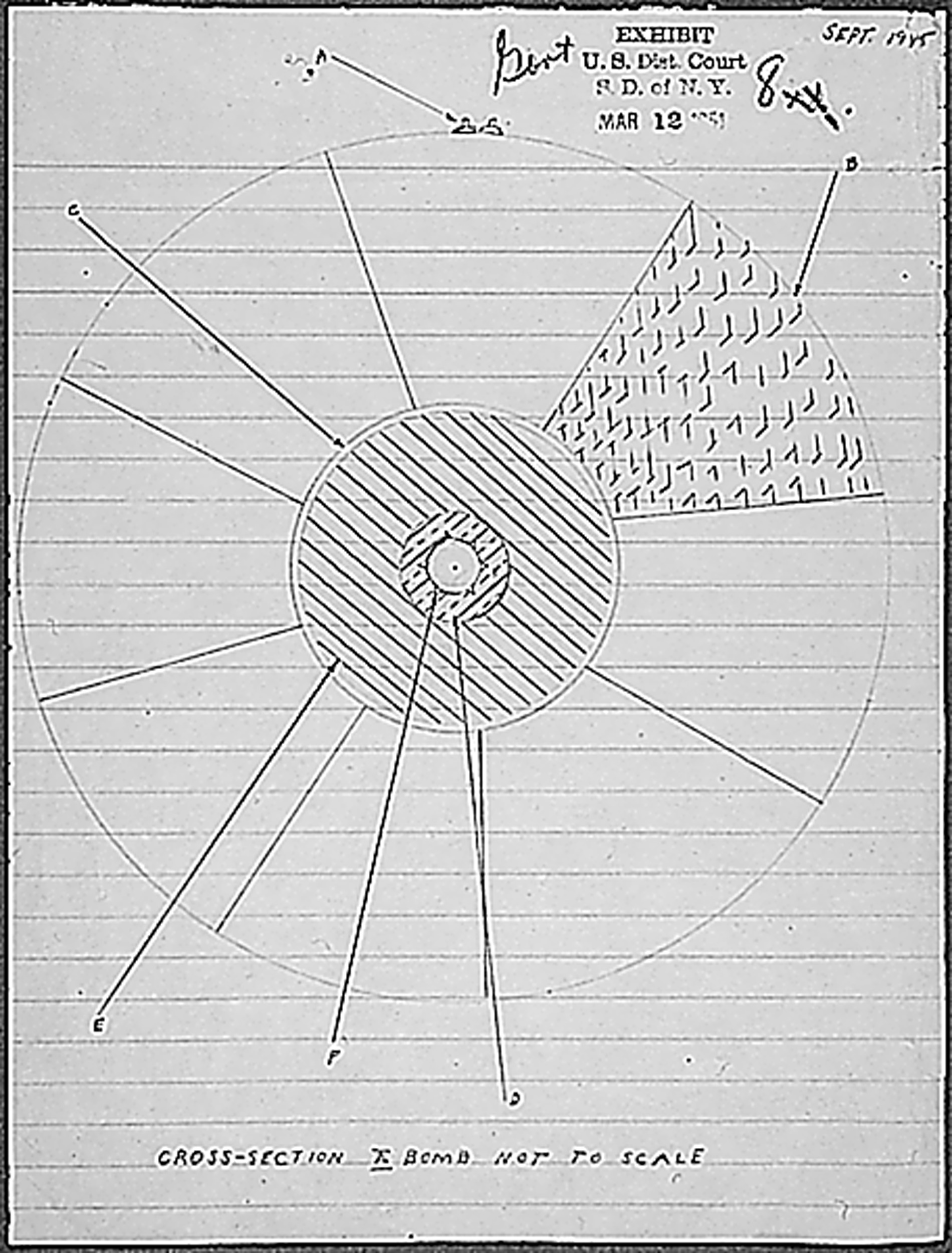
The 1945 sketch of circular shaped implosion-type passed by the American spies for the Soviet Union. This schematic was part of the development of RDS-1, test fired in Kazakhstan in 1949.

The nuclear and industrial espionages in the United States by American sympathisers of communism who were controlled by their rezident Russian officials in North America greatly aided the speed of the Soviet nuclear program from 1942–54. The willingness in sharing classified information to the Soviet Union by recruited American communist sympathizers increased when the Soviet Union faced possible defeat during the German invasion in World War II. The Russian intelligence network in the United Kingdom also played a vital role in setting up the spy rings in the United States when the State Defense Committee approved resolution 2352 in September 1942. This resolution instructed the Academy of Sciences of Ukrainian SSR to renew research efforts on nuclear energy and uranium nuclear fission and also directed the academy to report on the possibilities of a bomb or fuel source by April 1 of the following year.

For this purpose, the spy Harry Gold, controlled by Semyon Semyonov, was used for a wide range of espionage that included industrial espionage in the American chemical industry and obtaining sensitive atomic information that was handed over to him by the British physicist Klaus Fuchs. Knowledge and further technical information that were passed by the American Theodore Hall, a theoretical physicist, and Klaus Fuchs had a significant impact on the direction of Russian development of nuclear weapons.

Leonid Kvasnikov, a Russian engineer turned KGB officer, was assigned for this special purpose and moved to New York City to coordinate such activities. Anatoli Yatzkov, another NKVD official in New York, was also involved in obtaining sensitive information gathered by Sergei Kournakov from Saville Sax.

The existence of Russian spies was exposed by the U.S. Army's secretive Venona project in 1943.

In 1943, Molotov shared with Kurchatov the intelligence data accumulated through NKVD espionage. Kurchatov told Molotov, "The materials are magnificent. They add exactly what we have been missing." According to Richard Rhodes, "...Kurchatov learned enough, to transform the Soviet program...information that would accelerate the Soviet program by a full two years." This included an alternative to the problem of uranium isotope separation in making a bomb. Instead, Plutonium-239 could be used, which could be produced in a uranium-graphite pile through the absorption of neutrons by Uranium-238. Additionally, according to Kurchatov, the espionage material "made us include diffusion experiments in our plans along with centrifuge."

=== Soviet intelligence management in the Manhattan Project ===
In 1945, the Soviet intelligence obtained rough blueprints of the first U.S. atomic device. Alexei Kojevnikov has estimated that the primary way in which the espionage may have sped up the Soviet project was that it allowed Khariton to avoid dangerous tests to determine the size of the critical mass. These tests in the U.S., known as "tickling the dragon's tail", consumed a good deal of time and claimed at least two lives; see Harry Daghlian and Louis Slotin.

The published Smyth Report of 1945 on the Manhattan Project was translated into Russian, and the translators noted that a sentence on the effect of "poisoning" of Plutonium-239 in the first (lithograph) edition had been deleted from the next (Princeton) edition by Groves. This change was noted by the Russian translators, and alerted the Soviet Union to the problem (which had meant that reactor-bred plutonium could not be used in a simple gun-type bomb like the proposed Thin Man).

One of the key pieces of information, which Soviet intelligence obtained from Fuchs, was a cross-section for D-T fusion. This data was available to top Soviet officials roughly three years before it was openly published in the Physical Review in 1949. However, this data was not forwarded to Vitaly Ginzburg or Andrei Sakharov until very late, practically months before publication. Initially both Ginzburg and Sakharov estimated such a cross-section to be similar to the D-D reaction. Once the actual cross-section become known to Ginzburg and Sakharov, the Sloika design become a priority, which resulted in a successful test in 1953.

Comparing the timelines of H-bomb development, some researchers came to the conclusion that the Soviets had a gap in access to classified information regarding the H-bomb at least between late 1950 and some time in 1953. Earlier, e.g., in 1948, Fuchs gave the Soviets a detailed update of the classical super progress, including an idea to use lithium, but did not explain it was specifically lithium-6. By 1951 Teller accepted the fact that the "classical super" scheme wasn't feasible, following results obtained by various researchers (including Stanislaw Ulam) and calculations performed by John von Neumann in late 1950.

Yet the research for the Soviet analogue of "classical super" continued until December 1953, when the researchers were reallocated to a new project working on what later became a true H-bomb design, based on radiation implosion. This remains an open topic for research, whether the Soviet intelligence was able to obtain any specific data on Teller–Ulam design in 1953 or early 1954. Yet, Soviet officials directed the scientists to work on a new scheme, and the entire process took less than two years, commencing around January 1954 and producing a successful test in November 1955. It also took just several months before the idea of radiation implosion was conceived, and there is no documented evidence claiming priority. It is also possible that Soviets were able to obtain a document lost by John Wheeler on a train in 1953, which reportedly contained key information about thermonuclear weapon design.

== Initial design of thermonuclear weapons ==
The Russian language data studying the placement of Soviet warships to measure the (blast) ranges of their thermonuclear devices in 1955.

Early ideas of the thermonuclear bomb came from the Russian espionages in the United States, and the internal Soviet studies. Though the espionage did help the Soviet studies, the early American thermonuclear designs and concepts had substantial flaws, so it may have confused, rather than assisted, the Soviet effort to achieve the nuclear capability. The designers of the early thermonuclear bombs envisioned using an atomic bomb as a trigger to provide the needed heat and compression to initiate the thermonuclear reaction in a layer of liquid deuterium between the fissile material and the surrounding chemical high explosive. The group would realize that a lack of sufficient heat and compression of the deuterium would result in an insignificant fusion of the deuterium fuel.

The Andrei Sakharov's study group at FIAN in 1948 came up with a second concept in which adding a shell of natural, unenriched uranium around the deuterium would increase the deuterium concentration at the uranium-deuterium boundary and the overall yield of the device, because the natural uranium would capture neutrons and itself fission as part of the thermonuclear reaction. This idea of a layered fission-fusion-fission bomb led Sakharov to call it the sloika, or layered cake.

It was also known as the RDS-6S, or Second Idea Bomb. This second bomb idea was not a fully evolved thermonuclear bomb in the contemporary sense, but a crucial step between pure fission bombs and the thermonuclear "supers". Due to the three-year lag in making the key breakthrough of radiation compression from the United States the Soviet Union's development efforts followed a different course of action. In the United States they decided to skip the single-stage fusion bomb and make a two-stage fusion bomb as their main effort. Unlike the Soviet Union, the analog RDS-7 advanced fission bomb was not further developed, and instead, the single-stage 400-kiloton RDS-6S was the Soviet's bomb of choice.

The RDS-6S Layer Cake design was detonated on 12 August 1953, in a test given the code name by the Allies of "Joe 4". The test produced a yield of 400 kilotons, about ten times more powerful than any previous Soviet test. Around this time the United States detonated its first super using radiation compression on 1 November 1952, code-named Mike. Though the Mike was about twenty times greater than the RDS-6S, it was not a design that was practical to use, unlike the RDS-6S.

Following the successful launching of the RDS-6s, Sakharov proposed an upgraded version called RDS-6sD. This bomb was proved to be faulty, and it was neither built nor tested. The Soviet team had been working on the RDS-6t concept, but it also proved to be a dead end.

In 1954, Sakharov worked on a third concept, a two-stage thermonuclear bomb. The third idea used the radiation wave of a fission bomb, not simply heat and compression, to ignite the fusion reaction, and paralleled the discovery made by Ulam and Teller. Unlike the RDS-6s boosted bomb, which placed the fusion fuel inside the primary A-bomb trigger, the thermonuclear super placed the fusion fuel in a secondary structure a small distance from the A-bomb trigger, where it was compressed and ignited by the A-bomb's X-ray radiation. The KB-11 Scientific-Technical Council approved plans to proceed with the design on 24 December 1954. Technical specifications for the new bomb were completed on 3 February 1955, and it was designated the RDS-37.

The RDS-37 was successfully tested on 22 November 1955 with a yield of 1.6 megaton. The yield was almost a hundred times greater than the first Soviet atomic bomb six years before, showing that the Soviet Union could compete with the United States, and would even exceed them in time.

== Logistics ==
Nuclear weapons program sites of the USSR.
- Green: Laboratory
- Purple: Plutonium production plant
- Orange: Uranium enrichment plant
- Black: Nuclear test site

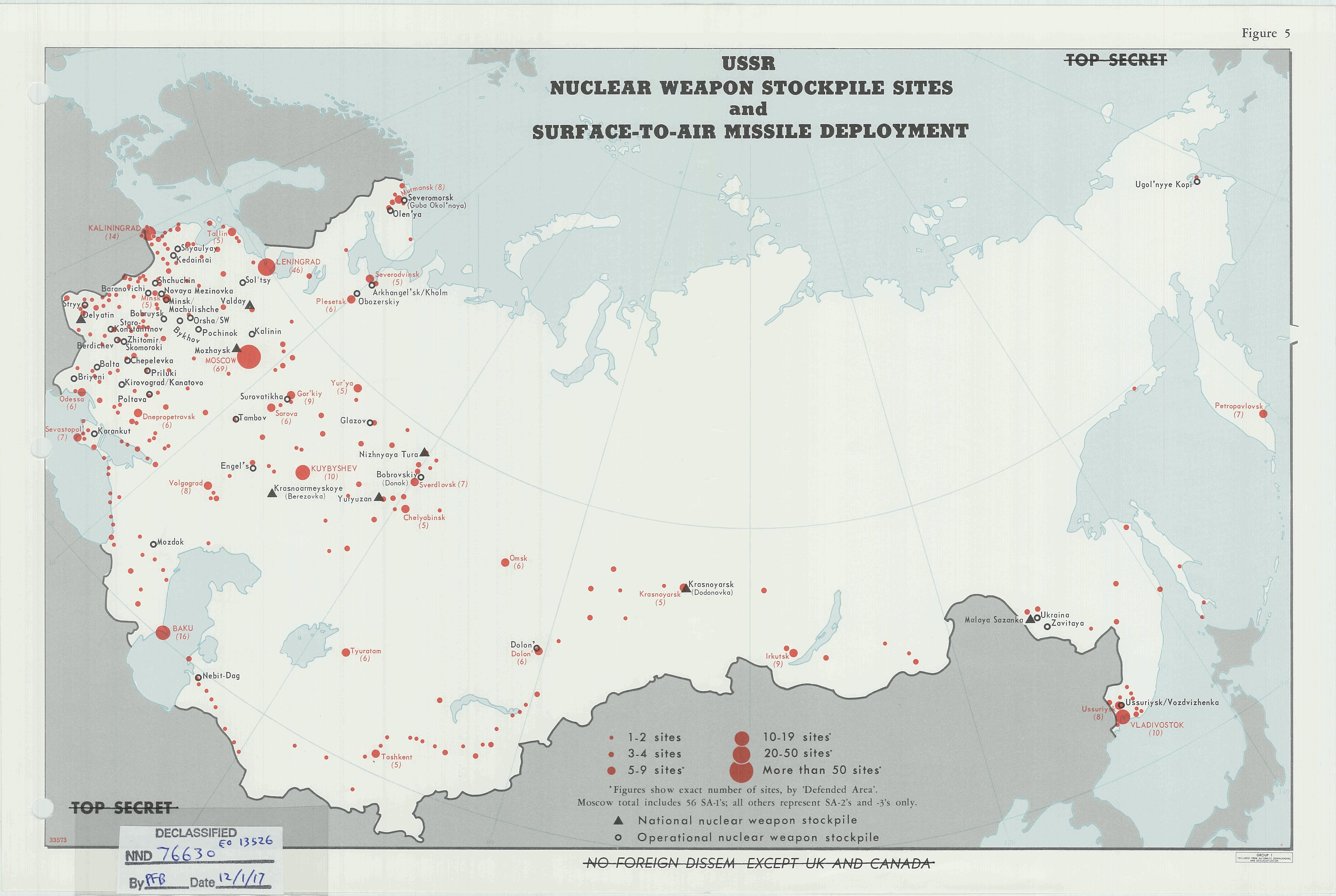
The 1981 CIA intelligence data showing the Soviet nuclear weapons sites in throughout the former Soviet Union. Declassified in 2017.

=== Mining of raw uranium ===
The single largest problem during the early Soviet program was the procurement of raw uranium ore, as the Soviet Union had limited domestic sources at the beginning of their nuclear program. The era of domestic uranium mining can be dated exactly, to November 27, 1942, the date of a directive issued by the all-powerful wartime State Defense Committee. The first Soviet uranium mine was established in Taboshar, present-day Tajikistan, and was producing at an annual rate of a few tons of uranium concentrate by May 1943. Taboshar was the first of many officially secret Soviet closed cities related to uranium mining and production.

Demand from the experimental bomb project was far higher. The Americans, with the help of Belgian businessman Edgar Sengier in 1940, had already blocked access to known sources in Congo, South Africa, and Canada. In December 1944 Stalin took the uranium project away from Vyacheslav Molotov and gave to it to Lavrentiy Beria. The first Soviet uranium processing plant was established as the Leninabad Mining and Chemical Combine in Chkalovsk (present-day Buston, Ghafurov District), Tajikistan, and new production sites identified in relative proximity. This posed a need for labor, a need that Beria would fill with forced labor: tens of thousands of Gulag prisoners were brought to work in the mines, the processing plants, and related construction.

Domestic production was still insufficient when the Soviet F-1 reactor, which began operation in December 1946, was fueled using uranium confiscated from the remains of the German atomic bomb project. This uranium had been mined in the Belgian Congo, and the ore in Belgium fell into the hands of the Germans after their invasion and occupation of Belgium in 1940. In 1945, the Uranium enrichment through electromagnetic method under Lev Artsimovich also failed due to USSR's inability to build the parallel American Oak Ridge site and the limited power grid system could not produce the electricity for their program.

Further sources of uranium in the early years of the program were mines in East Germany (via the deceptively-named SAG Wismut), Czechoslovakia, Bulgaria, Romania (the Băița mine near Ștei) and Poland. Boris Pregel sold 0.23 tonnes of uranium oxide to the Soviet Union during the war, with the authorisation of the U.S. Government.

Eventually, large domestic sources were discovered in the Soviet Union (including those now in Kazakhstan).

The uranium for the Soviet nuclear weapons program came from mine production in the following countries,

Year	USSR	Germany	Czechoslovakia	Bulgaria	Poland
1945	14.6 t				
1946	50.0 t	15 t	18 t	26.6 t	
1947	129.3 t	150 t	49.1 t	7.6 t	2.3 t
1948	182.5 t	321.2 t	103.2 t	18.2 t	9.3 t
1949	278.6 t	767.8 t	147.3 t	30.3 t	43.3 t
1950	416.9 t	1,224 t	281.4 t	70.9 t	63.6 t

=== Plutonium production ===
Reactors in italics were built for tritium production.

Plutonium production reactors in the USSR
Reactor name	Site	Design power (MWth)	Upgraded power (MWth)	Began operation	Shut down	Total plutonium (tons)	Design	Coolant circuit
A	Mayak Production Association	100	900	19 June 1948	16 June 1987	6.138	LWGR	Single-pass
AV-1	Mayak Production Association	300	1200	5 April 1950	12 August 1989	8.508	LWGR	Single-pass
AV-2	Mayak Production Association	300	1200	6 April 1951	14 July 1990	8.407	LWGR	Single-pass
AV-3	Mayak Production Association	300	1200	15 September 1952	1 November 1990	7.822	LWGR	Single-pass
AI-IR	Mayak Production Association	40	100	22 December 1952	25 May 1987	0.053	LWGR	Single-pass
OK-180	Mayak Production Association	100	233	17 October 1951	3 March 1966	0	HWR	Closed-circuit
OK-190	Mayak Production Association	300	300	27 December 1955	8 November 1965	0	HWR	Closed-circuit
OK-190M	Mayak Production Association	300	300	16 April 1966	16 April 1986	0	HWR	Closed-circuit
LF-2 "Ludmila"	Mayak Production Association	800	800	May 1988	In operation	0	HWR	Closed-circuit
"Ruslan"	Mayak Production Association	800	1100	12 June 1979	In operation	0	LWR	Closed-circuit
I-1	Siberian Chemical Combine	400	1200	20 November 1955	21 September 1990	8.237	LWGR	Single-pass
EI-2	Siberian Chemical Combine	400	1200	24 September 1958	31 December 1990	7.452	LWGR	Closed-circuit
ADE-3	Siberian Chemical Combine	1450	1900	14 July 1961	14 August 1990	14.020	LWGR	Closed-circuit
ADE-4	Siberian Chemical Combine	1450	1900	26 February 1964	20 April 2008	19.460	LWGR	Closed-circuit
ADE-5	Siberian Chemical Combine	1450	1900	27 June 1965	5 June 2008	19.144	LWGR	Closed-circuit
AD	Mining and Chemical Combine	1450	2000	25 August 1958	30 June 1992	15.433	LWGR	Single-pass
ADE-1	Mining and Chemical Combine	1450	2000	20 July 1961	29 September 1992	14.184	LWGR	Single-pass
ADE-2	Mining and Chemical Combine	1450	1800	January 1964	15 April 2010	16.317	LWGR	Closed-circuit
Total						144.9		

== Important nuclear tests ==
The mushroom cloud from the first air-dropped bomb test in 1951. This picture is confused with RDS-27 and RDS-37 tests.

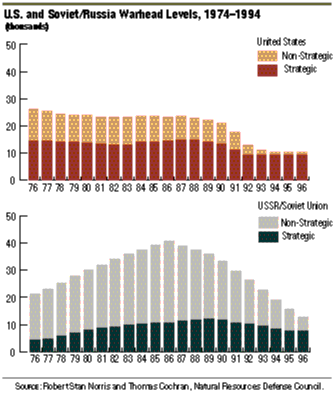
The Soviet program of nuclear weapons produces the stockpile (shown in black and white) reaching at its height in 1986 exceeding the United States stockpiles.

=== RDS-1 ===
The RDS-1, (Russian: PДC), was the first Soviet nuclear device that was test fired in Semipalatinsk in Kazakhstan on August 29, 1949. The first nuclear test, that proved the Russia's nuclear capability, has many codenames within Russian political community including the internally code-named First Lightning (Первая молния, or Pervaya Molniya).

Nonetheless, the test was widely known as "RDS-1" (Россия делает сама, Rossiya Delayet Sama, which translate as "Russia Does it Herself"), which was suggested by Igor Kurchatov– all Russian nuclear tests were then followed the RDS nomenclature. The Americans codenamed the test as Joe 1. The energy yield measurement and its design was mostly based on the American design "Fat Man", using a TNT/hexogen implosion lens design.

=== RDS-2 ===
The RDS-2 was a second important nuclear test that was conducted on September 24, 1951. The Soviet physicists measured the energy yield of the device at the 38.3 kiloton. The U.S. codenamed the test as "Joe-2".

=== RDS-3 ===
The RDS-3 was a third nuclear explosive device that was test fired on October 18, 1951, also in Semipalatinsk. Known as Joe 3 in America, this was a fission device using a composite construction of levitated plutonium core and a uranium-235 shell with estimated blast yield of 41.2 kt. The RDS-3 was also distinguished of being the first Russian air-dropped bomb test which was released at an altitude of 10 km, it detonated 400 meters above the ground.

=== RDS-4 ===
RDS-4 represented a branch of research on small tactical weapons. It used plutonium in a "levitated" core design. The first test was an air drop on August 23, 1953, yielding 28 kilotons. In 1954, the bomb was also used during Snowball exercise at the Totskoye range, dropped by Tu-4 bomber on the simulated battlefield, in the presence of 40,000 infantry, tanks, and jet fighters. The RDS-4 comprised the warhead of the R-5M, the first medium-range ballistic missile in the world, which was tested with a live warhead for the first and only time on February 5, 1956

=== RDS-5 ===
RDS-5 was a small plutonium based device, probably using a hollow core. Two different versions were made and tested.

=== RDS-6s ===
RDS-6s, the first Soviet test of a hydrogen bomb, took place on August 12, 1953, and was nicknamed Joe 4 by the Americans. It used a layer-cake design of fission and fusion fuels (uranium-235, lithium-6 deuteride, and lithium-6 deuteride tritide) and produced a yield of 400 kilotons. This yield was about ten times more powerful than any previous Soviet test. When developing higher level bombs, the Soviets proceeded with the RDS-6 concept as their main effort instead of the analog RDS-7 advanced fission bomb. This led to the third idea bomb which is the RDS-37.

=== RDS-9 ===
A much lower-power version of the RDS-4 with a 3-10 kiloton yield, the RDS-9 was developed for the T-5 nuclear torpedo. A 3.5 kiloton underwater test was performed with the torpedo on September 21, 1955.

=== RDS-37 ===
The first Soviet test of a "true" hydrogen bomb in the megaton range was conducted on November 22, 1955. It was dubbed RDS-37 by the Soviets. It was of the multi-staged, radiation implosion thermonuclear design called Sakharov's "Third Idea" in the USSR and the Teller–Ulam design in the U.S.

RDS-1, RDS-6s, and RDS-37 were all tested at the Semipalatinsk Test Site in Kazakhstan.

=== Tsar Bomba (AN602) ===
The Tsar Bomba (Царь-бомба) was the largest, most powerful thermonuclear weapon ever detonated. It was a three-stage hydrogen bomb with a yield of about 50 megatons. This is equivalent to ten times the amount of all the explosives used in World War II combined. It was detonated on October 30, 1961, in the Novaya Zemlya archipelago, and was capable of approximately 100 megatons, but was purposely reduced shortly before the launch. Although weaponized, it was not entered into service; it was simply a demonstrative testing of the capabilities of the Soviet Union's military technology at that time. The heat of the explosion was estimated to potentially inflict third degree burns at 100 km distance of clear air.

=== Chagan ===
Chagan was a shot in the Nuclear Explosions for the National Economy (also known as Project 7), the Soviet equivalent of the US Operation Plowshare to investigate peaceful uses of nuclear weapons. It was a subsurface detonation. It was fired on January 15, 1965. The site was a dry bed of the river Chagan at the edge of the Semipalatinsk Test Site, and was chosen such that the lip of the crater would dam the river during its high spring flow. The resultant crater had a diameter of 408 meters and was 100 meters deep. A major lake (10,000 m^{3}) soon formed behind the 20–35 m high upraised lip, known as Chagan Lake or Balapan Lake.

The photo is sometimes confused with RDS-1 in literature.

== Secret cities ==
During the Cold War, the Soviet Union created at least nine closed cities, known as Atomgrads, in which nuclear weapons-related research and development took place. The code names were generally given by the name of the nearest large city, suffixed with the last two digits of the postcode. After the dissolution of the Soviet Union, all of the cities changed their names. All are still legally "closed", though some have parts of them accessible to foreign visitors with special permits (Sarov, Snezhinsk, and Zheleznogorsk).

Cold War names	Current name	Established	Establishments	Current name	Primary functions
Arzamas-16 Arzamas-75	Sarov	1946	Design Bureau-11	All-Russian Scientific Research Institute of Experimental Physics	Weapons design and research, warhead assembly
Sverdlovsk-44	Novouralsk	1946	Ural Electrochemical Integrated Plant		Uranium enrichment
Chelyabinsk-40 Chelyabinsk-65	Ozyorsk	1947	Mayak Production Association		Plutonium production, component manufacturing
Sverdlovsk-45	Lesnoy	1947	Elektrokhimpribor Combine		Uranium enrichment, warhead assembly
Tomsk-7	Seversk	1949	Siberian Chemical Combine		Uranium enrichment, plutonium production, component manufacturing
Krasnoyarsk-26	Zheleznogorsk	1950	Mining and Chemical Combine		Plutonium production
Zlatoust-36	Tryokhgorny	1952	Instrument Making Plant		Warhead assembly
Penza-19	Zarechny	1955	Start Production Association		Warhead assembly
Krasnoyarsk-45	Zelenogorsk	1956	Electrochemical Plant		Uranium enrichment
Kasil-2 Chelyabinsk-50 Chelyabinsk-70	Snezhinsk	1957	Scientific Research Institute-1011	All-Russian Scientific Research Institute Of Technical Physics	Weapons design and research

== Environmental and public health effects ==
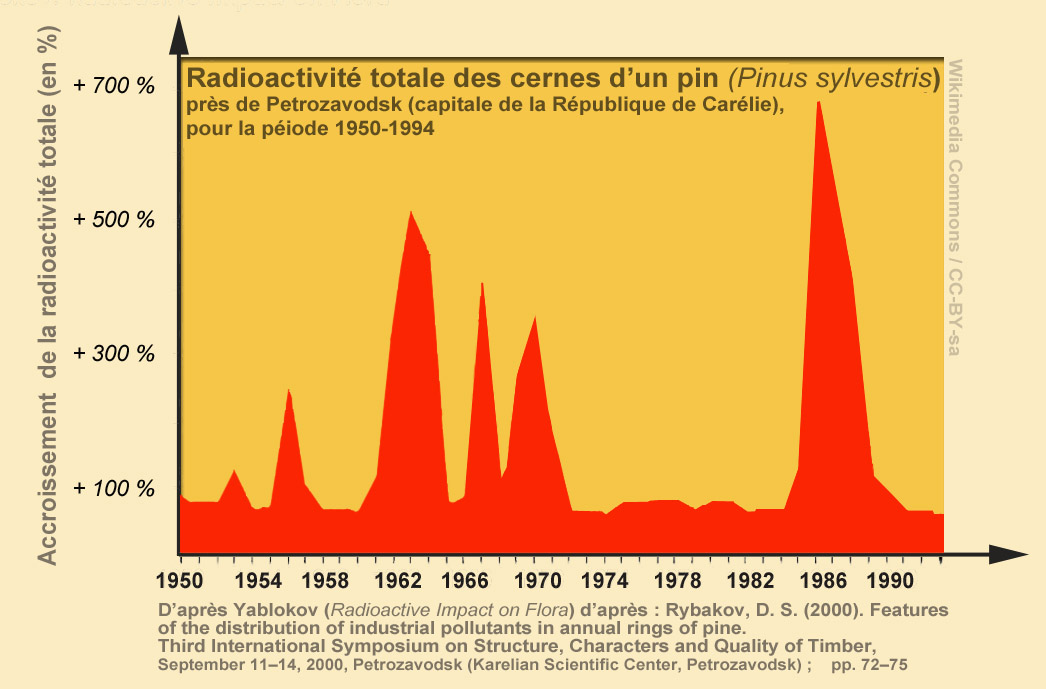
The former Soviet nuclear devices left behind large amounts of radioactive isotopes, which have contaminated air, water, and soil in the areas immediately surrounding them, enough to double the normal rate of ^{14}C from the atmosphere, and due to the increase in biomass and necromass.

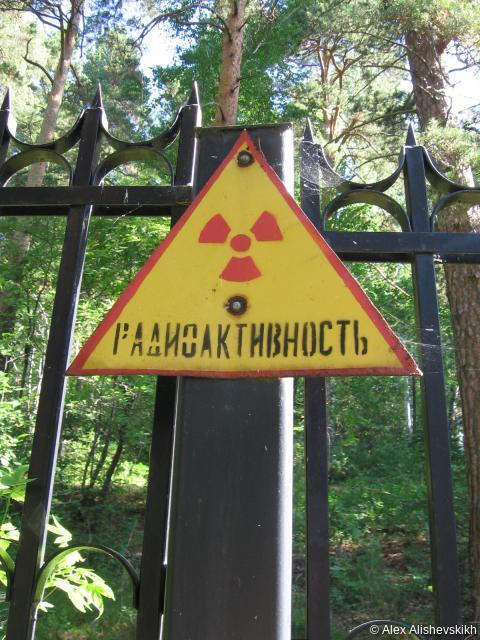
The Radioaktivnost warning sign left at the now-ruined and abandoned Laboratory B by Lake Sungul, ca. 2009.

The Soviets started experimenting with nuclear technology in 1943 with very little regard of nuclear safety as there were no reports of accidents that were ever made public to learn from, and the public was kept in ignorance about the radiation dangers. Many of the nuclear devices left behind radioactive isotopes which have contaminated air, water and soil in the areas immediately surrounding, downwind and downstream of the blast site. According to the records that the Russian government released in 1991, the Soviet Union tested 969 nuclear devices between 1949 and 1990— more nuclear testing than any nation on the planet. Soviet scientists conducted the tests with little regard for environmental and public health consequences. The detrimental effects that the toxic waste generated by weapons testing and processing of radioactive materials are still felt to this day. Even decades later, the risk of developing various types of cancer, especially that of the thyroid and the lungs, continues to be elevated far above national averages for people in affected areas. Iodine-131, a radioactive isotope that is a major byproduct of fission-based weapons, is retained in the thyroid gland, and so poisoning of this kind is commonplace in impacted populations.

The Soviets set off 214 nuclear devices in the open atmosphere between 1949 and 1963, the year the Partial Nuclear Test Ban Treaty came into effect (there were no Soviet tests in 1950, 1959, 1960, or 1962). The billions of radioactive particles released into the air exposed countless people to extremely mutagenic and carcinogenic materials, resulting in a myriad of deleterious genetic maladies and deformities. The majority of these tests took place at the Semipalatinsk Test Site, or the Polygon, located in northeast of Kazakhstan. The testing at Semipalatinsk alone exposed hundreds of thousands of Kazakh citizens to these harmful effects, and the site continues to be one of the most highly irradiated places on the planet. When the earliest tests were being conducted, even the scientists had only a poor understanding of the medium-and long-term effects of radiation exposure - many did not notify each other of their work if they had serious accidents or radiation exposure. In fact, the Semipalatinsk was chosen as the primary site for open-air testing precisely because the Soviets were curious about the potential for lasting harm that their weapons held.

The 1996 level of Cesium-137 contamination over Ukraine after an unsafe operation led to a serious accident in 1986.

Contamination of air and soil due to atmospheric testing is only part of a wider issue. Water contamination due to improper disposal of spent uranium and decay of sunken nuclear-powered submarines is a major problem in the Kola Peninsula in northwest Russia. Although the Russian government states that the radioactive power cores are stable, various scientists have come forth with serious concerns about the 32,000 spent nuclear fuel elements that remain in the sunken vessels. There have been no major incidents other than the explosion and sinking of a nuclear-powered submarine in August 2000, but many international scientists are still uneasy at the prospect of the hulls eroding, releasing uranium into the sea and causing considerable contamination. Although the submarines pose an environmental risk, they have yet to cause serious harm to public health. However, water contamination in the area of the Mayak test site, especially at Lake Karachay, is extreme, and has gotten to the point where radioactive byproducts have found their way into drinking water supplies. It has been an area of concern since the early 1950s, when the Soviets began disposing of tens of millions of cubic meters of radioactive waste by pumping it into the small lake. Half a century later, in the 1990s, there are still hundreds of millions of curies of waste in the Lake, and at points contamination has been so severe that a mere half-hour of exposure to certain regions would deliver a dose of radiation sufficient to kill 50% of humans. Although the area immediately surrounding the lake is devoid of population, the lake has the potential to dry up in times of drought. Most significantly, in 1967, it dried up and winds carried radioactive dust over thousands of square kilometers, exposing at least 500,000 citizens to a range of health risks. To control dust, Soviet scientists piled concrete on top of the lake. Although this was effective in helping mediate the amount of dust, the weight of the concrete pushed radioactive materials into closer contact with standing underground groundwater. It is difficult to gauge the overall health and environmental effects of the water contamination at Lake Karachay because figures on civilian exposure are unavailable, making it hard to show causation between elevated cancer rates and radioactive pollution specifically from the lake.

Contemporary efforts to manage radioactive contamination in the former Soviet Union are few and far between. Public awareness of the past and present dangers, as well as the Russian government's investment in current cleanup efforts, are likely dampened by the lack of media attention STS and other sites have gotten in comparison to isolated nuclear incidents such as Hiroshima, Nagasaki, Chernobyl and Three-Mile Island. The domestic government's investment in cleanup measures seems to be driven by economic concerns rather than care for public health. The most significant political legislation in this area is a bill agreeing to turn the already contaminated former weapons complex Mayak into an international radioactive waste dump, accepting cash from other countries in exchange for taking their radioactive byproducts of nuclear industry. Although the bill stipulates that the revenue go towards decontaminating other test sites such as Semipalatinsk and the Kola Peninsula, experts doubt whether this will actually happen given the current political and economic climate in Russia.

== See also ==
- Bibliography of science and technology in Russia and the Soviet Union
- History of nuclear weapons
- History of the Soviet Union (1927–1953)
- Julius and Ethel Rosenberg
- Military history of the Soviet Union
- Pavel Sudoplatov
- Sino-Soviet split
- Soviet space program
