= Nuclear gravity bomb =

Nuclear weapon

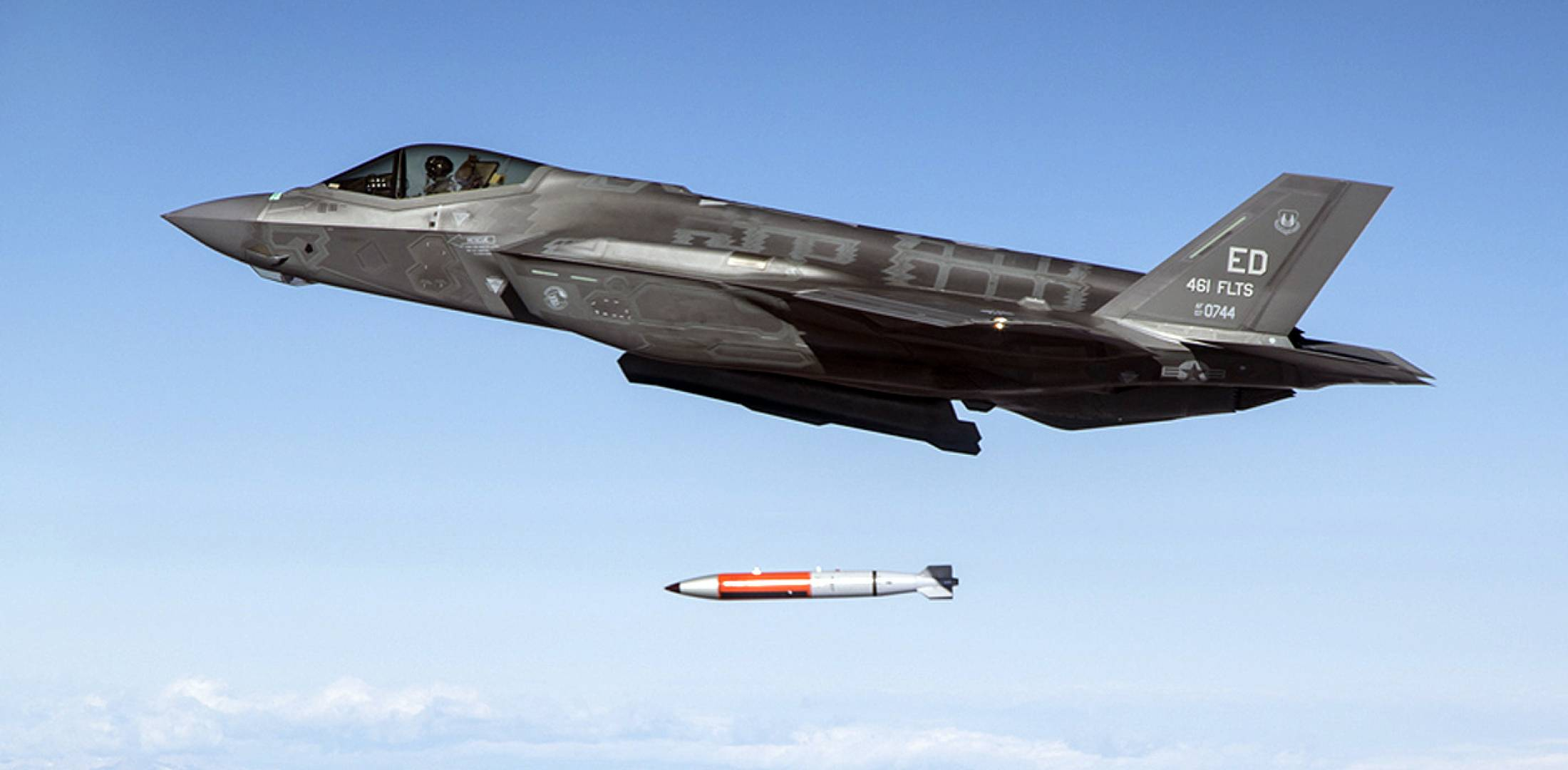
A US F-35 fighter test-drops an inert B61 Mod 12 nuclear gravity bomb in 2021.

A nuclear gravity bomb is a nuclear weapon intended to be dropped from an aircraft, with no propulsion. It may be an unguided bomb or a glide bomb. This is in contrast to nuclear-armed air-launched cruise missiles, air-launched ballistic missile, and air-to-air missiles.

As of 2025, nuclear gravity bombs are used in the arsenals of the United States, Russia, Israel, India, and Pakistan, but not in the arsenals of China, France, the United Kingdom, and North Korea.

== History ==
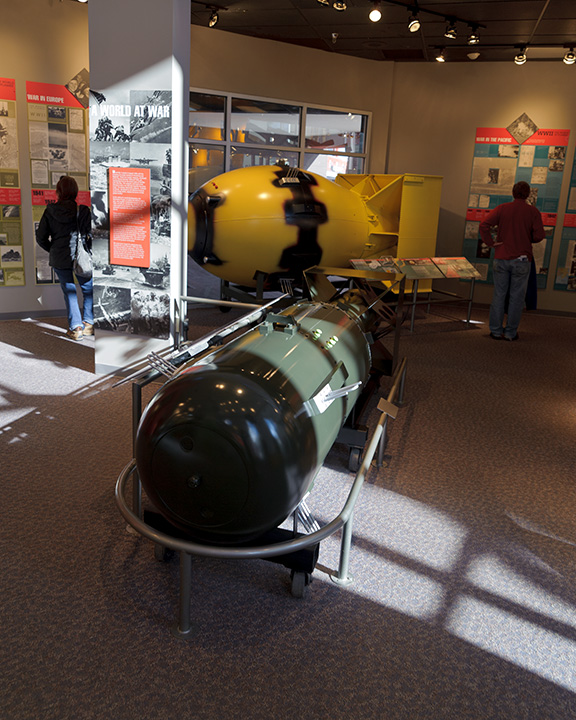
Full-scale models of the Little Boy (foreground) and Fat Man (background) nuclear gravity bombs at the Bradbury Science Museum in Los Alamos, US.

Nuclear gravity bombs were the first nuclear weapons constructed and only nuclear weapons to ever be used in war: at the end of World War II, the US attacked Hiroshima with a Little Boy bomb and attacked Nagasaki with a Fat Man bomb.

Nuclear gravity bombs initially dominated the Cold War's nuclear arms race, due to reliance on strategic bombers. In 1954, the US' Strategic Air Command anticipated it would deliver 750 bombs against the Soviet Union's 150 bombs. The introduction of intercontinental ballistic missiles, submarine-launched ballistic missiles, and advanced cruise missiles decreased the strategic relevance of gravity bombs.

Nuclear gravity bombs were also a primary method of atmospheric nuclear testing. This allowed the testing of larger thermonuclear weapons without ground contamination causing fallout. Examples include the Soviet RDS-37 and Tsar Bomba, Chinese Project 596L and Project 639, and US Ivy King (non-thermonuclear).

The first nuclear weapons put into production by a country are typically gravity bombs, including the US Mark III (Fat Man), the Soviet Union's RDS-1, the UK Blue Danube and French AN-11.

Nuclear gravity bombs were also historically used as tactical nuclear weapons, such as US Mark 7, Soviet RDS-4, UK WE.177, French AN-52, and Chinese Kuangbiao-1.

== Current usage ==
The US currently maintains the B61 and B83 nuclear bombs. The B61 has strategic variants, up to 400 kilotons, intended for delivery by B-2 Spirit and B-21 Raider bombers, while its tactical variants can also be delivered by F-15, F-16, F/A-18, and F-35 fighters. The B61 is also forward-deployed to airbases in European NATO countries, where it is also intended for delivery by host country Panavia Tornados. The B61 Mod 12 has an enhanced tail kit and glide bomb capability. The B83, at 1.2 megatons, has been the largest weapon in the US nuclear arsenal since the 2011 retirement of the B53 nuclear bomb.

In 2025, Commander of US Strategic Command General Anthony J. Cotton claimed Russian Tu-95 and Tu-160 strategic bombers could deliver nuclear gravity bombs, but a Federation of American Scientists report deemed this practically unlikely. Russia can deploy tactical nuclear bombs from its Tu-22 M3, Su-24, Su-34, and MiG-31K aircraft. Russia is believed to forward-deploy nuclear gravity bombs to Belarus, where Belarusian Air Force crews are trained to deliver them via Su-25 aircraft.

Israel is believed to designate nuclear squadrons of F-15I and F-16I fighters at Tel Nof Airbase and Hatzerim Airbase. There is also speculation that its F-35I fighters may be capable of deploying nuclear weapons.

India operates Dassault Mirage 2000, SEPECAT Jaguar, and Dassault Rafale fighters in nuclear bomb delivery roles. It intends to fully replace its Jaguars with HAL Tejas Mk2 multirole fighters by 2035.

Pakistan operates Dassault Mirage III and Mirage 5 fighters for nuclear bomb delivery, with unconfirmed reports they also modified F-16 fighters procured from the US. It has also been speculated CAC/PAC JF-17 Thunder aircraft will take over the Pakistan Air Force nuclear role, although possibly only with the Ra'ad cruise missile series.

== See also ==
- Nuclear weapons delivery
- Strategic bomber
- B61 nuclear bomb
- Air-launched cruise missile
- Air-launched ballistic missile
- Air-to-air missile
