= RDS-2 =

Soviet atomic bomb

RDS-2 РДС-2

Information
- Country: Soviet Union
- Test site: Semipalatinsk Test Site, Kazakhstan
- Date: September 24, 1951 (74 years ago)
- Test type: Atmospheric
- Device type: Plutonium implosion fission
- Yield: 38.3 kt (160 TJ)

Test chronology

The RDS-2 (Russian: РДС-2) was a second nuclear bomb developed by the Soviet Union as an improved version of the RDS-1. It included new explosive lenses along with a new core design to decrease the probability of pre-detonation or 'fizzle'. The levitated core increased implosion efficiency by allowing for an empty space between the "flying layer" and the core, thereby allowing rapid acceleration of the shock wave before it impacted the core.

The RDS-2 weighed approximately 3,200 kilograms (7,055 lb) and had a diameter of 1.25 m. (Note: RDS-2 and RDS-3 differed only in nuclear core, hence similar weight and diameter) The RDS-2 was tested on September 24, 1951 and produced a 38.3 kiloton yield. It was detonated from the top of a tower thirty meters high. The detonation was initiated by a bomber flying over the testing site instead of the detonation being initiated by a ground control center.

== See also ==
- Soviet atomic bomb project
- RDS-1
- RDS-3
