= Siberian Chemical Combine =

Nuclear energy and weapons facility in Seversk, Russia

- Type: Joint-stock company
- Founded: 1949
- Headquarters: Seversk, Russia
- Parent: TVEL (Rosatom)
- Website: atomsib.ru

The Siberian Chemical Combine (Russian: Сибирский химический комбинат) was established in 1953 in Tomsk-7 now known as Seversk, in the Tomsk Region as a single complex of the nuclear technological cycle for the creation of nuclear weapons components based on fissile materials (highly enriched uranium and plutonium). It is a subsidiary of TVEL (Rosatom group).

== History ==
The Siberian Chemical Combine played an important role in the Soviet Union's nuclear weapons program. The facility produced plutonium and highly enriched uranium (HEU), and fabricated warhead components using produced plutonium and HEU.

As the Cold War came to an end, the Siberian Chemical Combine's HEU production ceased and the last plutonium production nuclear reactor at the facility was shut down in 2008. The site had five reactors: EI-1 (1955), EI-2 (1958), ADE-3 (1961) and ADE-2 (1963). The ADE series of reactors also produced thermal and electrical energy, reaching electricity production of 600 MWe. All the reactors were decommissioned by 2023.

Although production has halted, the facility remains a major site for storage and handling of weapon-usable materials and nuclear weapon components.

Presently, the facility supplies Russia's low enriched uranium fuel needs and enriches reprocessed uranium for foreign customers. The facility is one of the largest sites that stores low and intermediate level nuclear wastes from reprocessing with more than 30 million cubic meters stored via deep-well injection.

== Facilities ==
The complex is based on four plants:

- Isotope separation plant (ZRI) - separates uranium isotopes with a low degree of 235-U enrichment. Operates since 1953. Until 1973, gas diffusion separation was carried out, and later - centrifugal separation. A number of stable isotopes of xenon, tin, selenium, etc. are also produced.
- Sublimation plant (NW) - processing of uranium-containing products, including highly enriched uranium for fuel elements and raw uranium hexafluoride for isotope enrichment. It was launched in 1954–1955.
- Radiochemical Plant (RHC) - processing of irradiated uranium blocks for the purpose of extraction of uranium and plutonium, as well as other radionuclides. The first stage since 1961, the second - since 1962. At the moment, the main activity of the chemical plant is the production of pure compounds of natural uranium (refining).
- Chemical-Metallurgical Plant (KMZ) - melting and processing of plutonium with the production of components for nuclear weapons and special items. Manufacture of magnetic alloys and magnets from them. Production of ultrafine powders.

== Awards ==
- On March 7, 1962, by Decree of the Presidium of the Supreme Soviet of the USSR, the plant was awarded the Order of Lenin "for successfully fulfilling a special task of the government for the manufacture of special defense products."
- On January 18, 1971, by Decree of the Presidium of the Supreme Soviet of the USSR, the plant was awarded the Order of the October Revolution for successfully completing the tasks of the five-year plan for the production of special products, the introduction of new equipment and advanced technology.

== Directors ==
- 1950-1955 — Shchekin Ivan Antonovich (1901–1993);
- 1955-1957 — Churin Aleksandr Ivanovich (1907–1981);
- 1957-1960 — Rodionov Mikhail Petrovich (1904–1976);
- 1960-1965 — Leontichuk Aleksandr Semenovich (1908–1982);
- 1965-1990 — Zaitsev Stepan Ivanovich (1918–2014);
- 1990-2000 — Handorin Gennadiy Petrovich (1932–2021);
- 2000-2002 — Larin Valeriy Konstantinovich (born 1947);
- 2002-2005 — Shidlovskiy Vladimir Vladislavovich (born 1952);
- 2005-2012 — Korotkevich Vladimir Mikhailovich (born 1949);
- 2012-2021 — Tochilin Sergey Borisovich (1955–2021);
- 2021–present — Kotov Sergey Alekseevich (born 1962)

== See also ==
- Nuclear power in Russia
- Mining and Chemical Combine - plutonium production plant using similar nuclear reactors
- Sibirskaya Nuclear Power Plant
