= Totskoye air base =

Air base in Orenburg Oblast, Russia

Totskoye
- Totskoye, Orenburg Oblast in Russia

Site information
- Type: Air Base
- Owner: Ministry of Defence
- Operator: Russian Air Force

Location
- Shown within Orenburg Oblast Totskoye (Russia)
- Coordinates: 52°30′6″N 052°46′48″E

Site history
- In use: 1976 - present?

Airfield information
- Identifiers: ICAO: XWOT
- Elevation: 90 metres (295 ft) AMSL
Runways
Direction	Length and surface
09/27	2,500 metres (8,202 ft) Concrete

Totskoye (also Totskoe) is an air base in Russia located four kilometres southeast of Totskoye. It is a standard military air base with small number of revetments in a separate area.

In 1976 the 281st Instructor Fighter-Bomber Aviation Regiment was established at the base. It was redesignated the 281st Instructor Fighter Aviation Regiment (281 IIAP) in 1989.

In mid-May 1992 the 833rd Fighter Aviation Regiment (833 IAP) flying MiG-23 aircraft relocated from Jüterbog-Altes Lager, Germany [51 59 45N, 12 58 57E]. It had been stationed in Juterbog since October 1953. It was quickly disbanded.

In 1994 the 281st Instructor Fighter-Bomber Aviation Regiment, then with a reported 66 Mikoyan-Gurevich MiG-23 aircraft, was disbanded.

Totskoye now hosts the 2881st Reserve Helicopter Base (2881 BRV) storing Mi-8 and Mi-24 helicopters.

There were 56 stored helicopters and five operational helicopters according to Google Earth high-resolution imagery made in 2003. Google Earth images from 29-08-2012 however shows an abandoned airfield.
