= RDS-1 =

1949 Soviet nuclear bomb test

Coordinates: 50°26′15″N 77°48′51″E

- The mushroom cloud from RDS-1, the first Soviet nuclear test

Information
- Country: Soviet Union
- Test site: Semipalatinsk Test Site, Kazakhstan
- Date: 29 August 1949
- Number of tests: 1
- Test type: Tower
- Max. yield: 22 kt (92 TJ)

Test series chronology

The RDS-1 (Russian: РДС-1), also known as First Lightning (Russian: Пе́рвая мо́лния, romanized: Pyérvaya mólniya, IPA: [ˈpʲervəjə ˈmolnʲɪjə]), was the first nuclear weapons test that was conducted by the Soviet Union. It was detonated on 29 August 1949 at 7:00 a.m. Kazakhstan Time (decree time) (UTC+06:00), at the Semipalatinsk Test Site in the Kazakh Soviet Socialist Republic, and yielded 22 kilotons of TNT.

It was roughly based on the American design, Fat Man, and the United States assigned it the code-name Joe-1, in reference to Joseph Stalin. RDS-1 also refers to the model of nuclear gravity bomb put into weapons production, with 29 bombs stockpiled by 1951. When referring to the serially-produced model, it was known as Izdeliye 501 (изделие 501, 'Device/Product/Item 501').

The United States initially detected the test's nuclear fallout four days later via its anticipatory program for aerial sampling regions near the Soviet Union. On 23 September, US President Harry S. Truman publicly announced evidence that "an atomic explosion occurred in the U.S.S.R." The Soviet government initially denied the report, suggesting a misidentification of its excavation works for hydroelectric power, however it made cryptic statements before and after the test about its nuclear capability. In response, the United States government ordered a crash program to develop the "Super" i.e. hydrogen bomb, accelerating the nuclear arms race.

== Etymology ==
There are several explanations for the Soviet code-name of RDS-1, usually an arbitrary designation: a backronym "Special Jet Engine" (Реактивный двигатель специальный, Reaktivnyi Dvigatel Spetsialnyi), or "Stalin's Jet Engine" (Реактивный двигатель Сталина, Reaktivnyi Dvigatel Stalina), or "Russia does it herself" (Россия делает сама, Rossiya Delayet Sama). Later weapons were also designated RDS but with different model numbers.

== Description ==
The weapon was designed at the Kurchatov Institute, then at the time officially known as "Laboratory № 2" but designated as the "office" or "base" in internal documents, starting in April 1946. Plutonium for the bomb was produced at the industrial complex Chelyabinsk-40.

The first Soviet atomic bomb, "RDS-1", was an implosion-type, like the U.S. "Fat Man" bomb, even in appearance; the front "eyes" are radar fuses.

The RDS-1 explosive yield was 22 kilotons TNT equivalent, similar to the US Gadget and Fat Man bombs. At Lavrentiy Beria's insistence, the RDS-1 bomb was designed as an implosion type weapon, similar to the Fat Man bomb dropped on Nagasaki, Japan; RDS-1 also had a solid plutonium core. The bomb designers had developed a more sophisticated design (tested later as RDS-2) but rejected it because of the known reliability of the Fat Man type design, the Soviets having received extensive intelligence on the design of the Fat Man bomb during World War II, which was discovered in the espionage case of Julius and Ethel Rosenberg and during the Venona project.

To test the effects of the new weapon, workers constructed houses made of wood and bricks, along with a bridge, and a simulated metro railway in the vicinity of the test site. Armoured hardware and approximately 50 aircraft were also brought to the testing grounds as well as over 1,500 animals to test the bomb's effects on life. In a sector of artillery about 100 guns and mortars were placed at distances ranging from 250 to 1,800 meters from ground zero. At distances 500 to 550 meters from ground zero artillery pieces were either totally destroyed or needed factory repair. The resulting data showed the RDS explosion to be 50% more destructive than originally estimated by its engineers.

Mikhail Pervukhin served as the chairman of the commission in charge of the RDS-1 testing. Igor Kurchatov and Yulii Khariton were in charge of weapons development. Security chief Lavrentiy Beria supervised the test.

Five RDS-1 weapons were completed as a pilot series by March 1950 with serial production of the weapon beginning in December 1951.

== Detection by the West ==
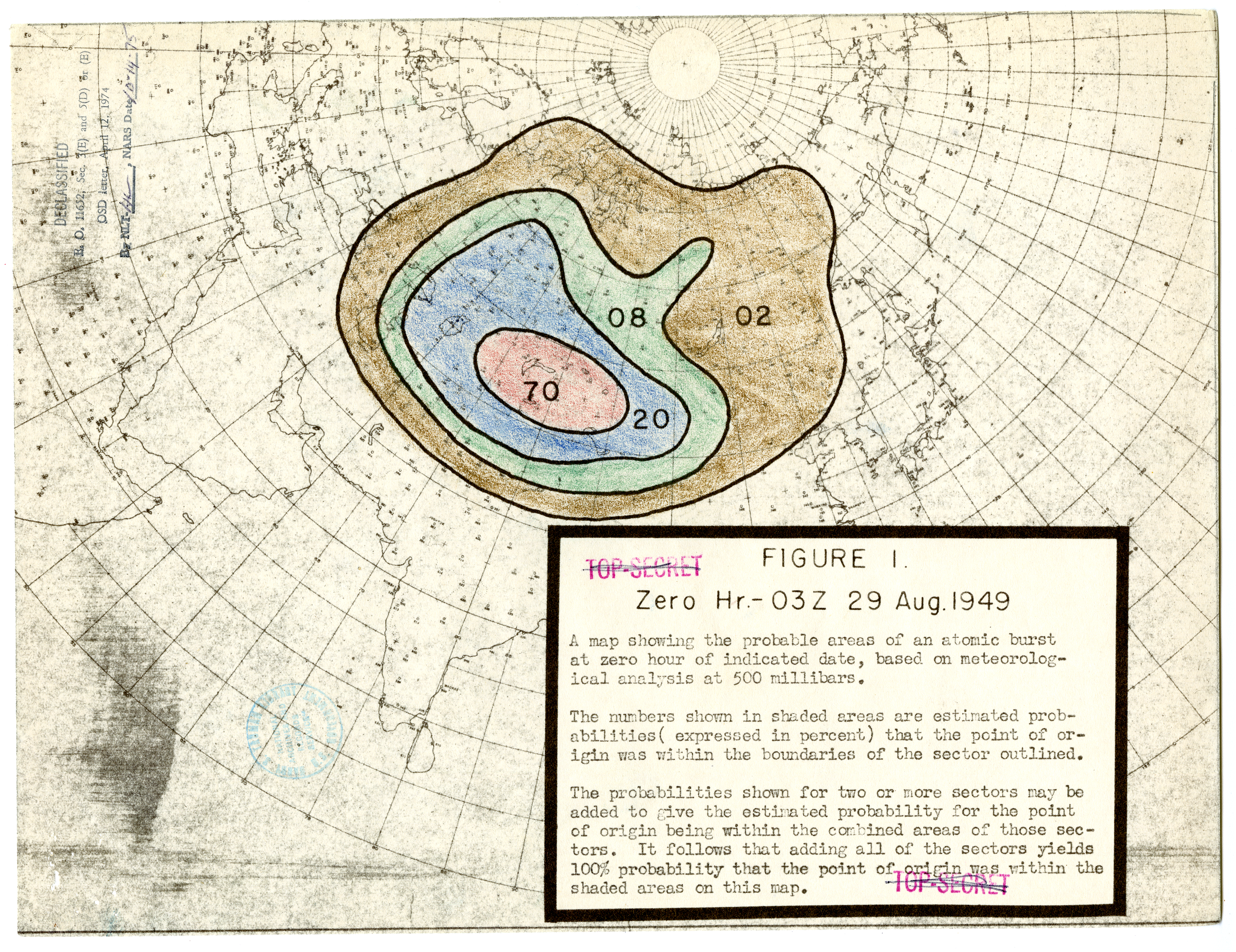
This chart from September 1949 shows the United States Weather Bureau's prediction for where the Soviet Union first tested its atomic bomb in 1949. Each colored zone indicates the probability that the bomb was detonated within that area.

Some United States Air Force WB-29 weather reconnaissance aircraft were fitted with special filters to collect atmospheric radioactive debris. On 3 September 1949, the Air Force Office of Atomic Energy had a WB-29 fly from Misawa Air Base in Japan to Eielson Air Force Base in Alaska. The plane collected some debris during this flight. This data was then cross-checked with data from later flights, and it was determined that the Soviet Union had effectively tested a nuclear weapon.

== Response in the West ==
The test surprised the Western powers. American intelligence had estimated that the Soviets would not produce an atomic weapon until 1953, while the British did not expect it until 1954. When the nuclear fission products from the test were detected by the U.S. Air Force, the United States began to follow the trail of the nuclear fallout debris. President Harry S. Truman notified the world of the situation on 23 September 1949: "We have evidence that within recent weeks an atomic explosion occurred in the U.S.S.R." Truman's statement likely in turn surprised the Soviets, who had hoped to keep the test a secret to avoid encouraging the Americans to increase their atomic programs, and did not know that the United States had built a test-detection system using the WB-29. The announcement was a turning point in the Cold War, that had just begun, and marked the beginning of the nuclear arms race. Once the Soviet Union was confirmed to be in possession of the atomic bomb, pressure mounted to develop the first hydrogen bomb. Truman was informed of the possibility of such a weapon thirteen days later, on 6 October 1949.

== Response in the Soviet Union ==
Following Truman's announcement, Soviet state newspaper TASS released a report. It suggested the West had detected signatures from excavation works in the Soviet Union. Nonetheless, it stated the Soviet Union possessed nuclear weapons, and noted the November 1947 claim by Minister of Foreign Affairs Vyacheslav Molotov, that the Soviet Union understood the "secret" of nuclear weapons design. Deputy Chairman of the Council of Ministers Kliment Voroshilov internationally reiterated nuclear capability five months later in March 1950.

The RDS-1 device was put into weapons production from 1949 to 1951, stockpiling 29 bombs, compared to the US' 1947 to 1949 production of 120 first-generation Fat Man bombs.

== See also ==
- List of nuclear weapons tests of the Soviet Union
- RDS-2
- RDS-3 – first Soviet airdropped nuclear test
- RDS-4
- RDS-6s – first Soviet boosted fission test
- RDS-37 – first Soviet thermonuclear test
- Tsar Bomba (AN602) – most powerful nuclear test ever
- Plan Totality – 1945 US disinformation ploy on extensive nuclear targeting of the USSR
- Julius and Ethel Rosenberg – US atomic spies for the Soviet Union
- Trinity (nuclear test) – first American nuclear test, also plutonium implosion design
- Operation Hurricane – first British nuclear test, also plutonium implosion design
- Gerboise Bleue (nuclear test) – first French nuclear test, also plutonium implosion design
