= Totskoye nuclear exercise =

1954 Soviet nuclear test with soldiers

Coordinates: 52°38′41″N 52°48′16″E

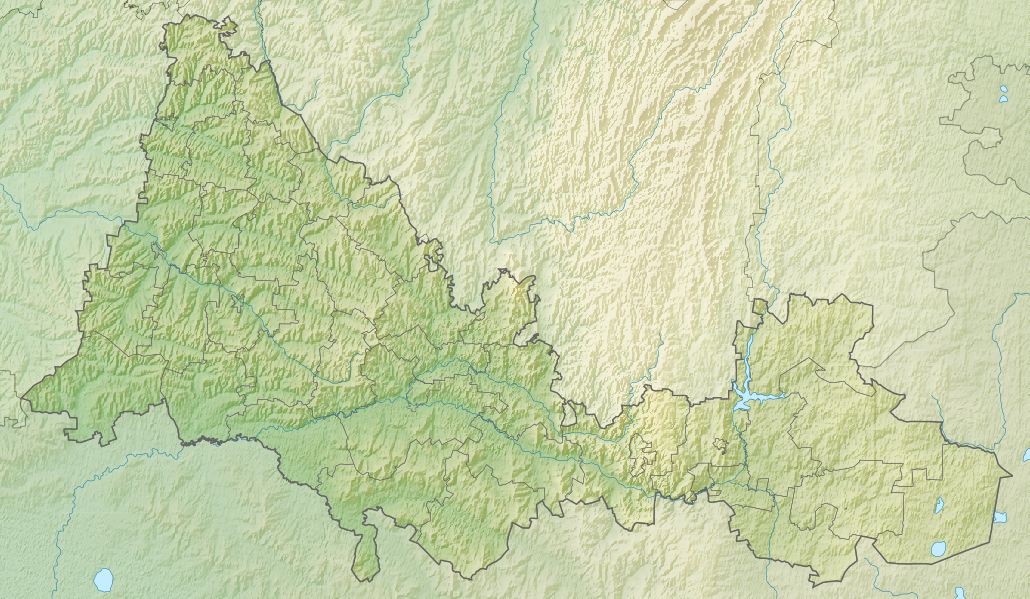
Totskoye proving ground
Totskoye nuclear exercise (European Russia)
Totskoye nuclear exercise (Russia)

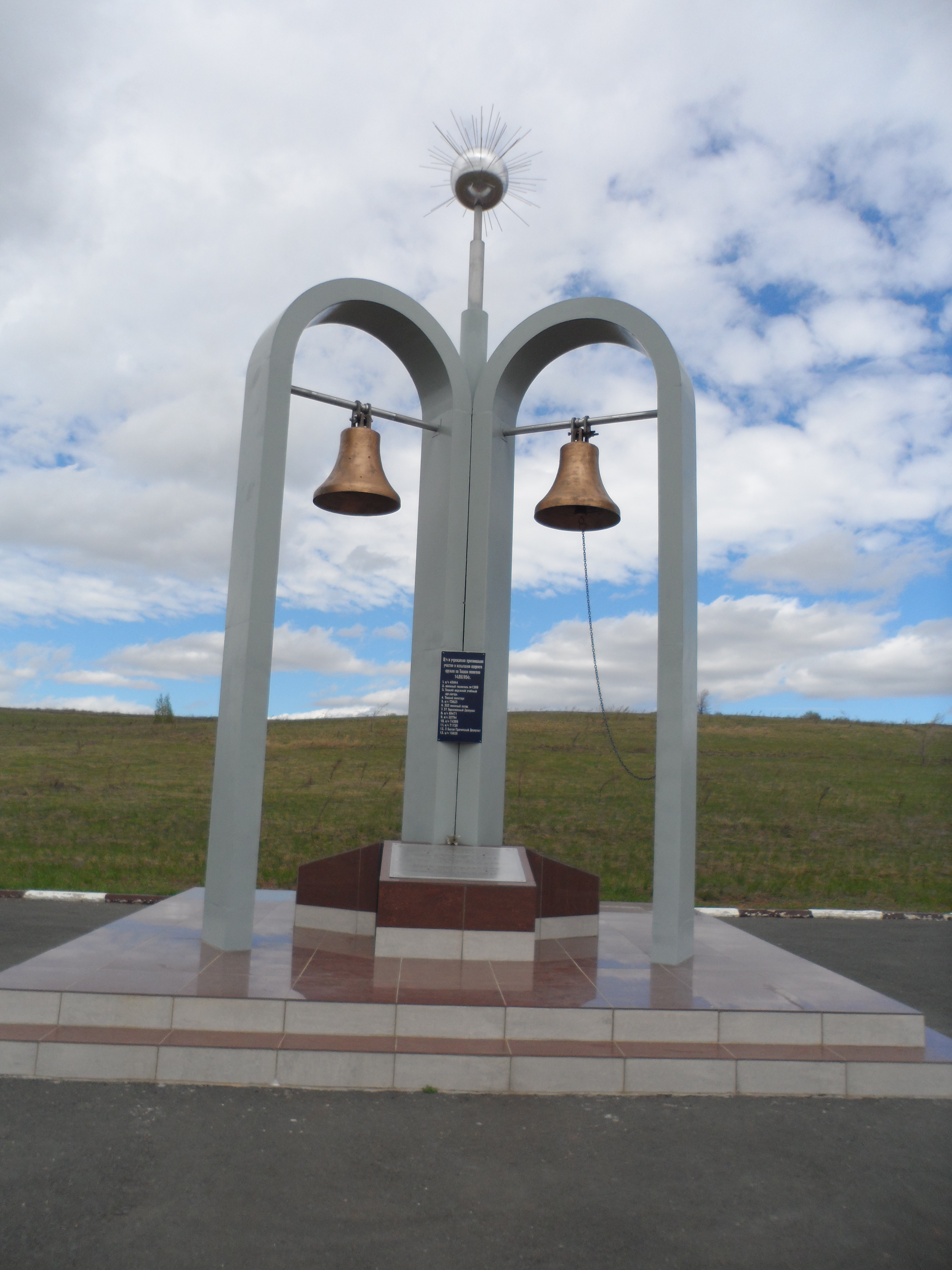
Memorial sign marking the epicenter

The Totskoye nuclear exercise was a military exercise undertaken by the Soviet Army to explore defensive and offensive warfare during nuclear war. The exercise, under the code name "Snowball" (Russian: Снежок, romanized: Snezhok), involved an aerial detonation of a 40 kt RDS-4 nuclear bomb. The stated goal of the operation was military training for breaking through heavily fortified defensive lines of a military opponent using nuclear weapons. An army of 45,000 soldiers marched through the area around the hypocenter soon after the nuclear blast. The exercise was conducted on September 14, 1954, at 9.33 a.m., under the command of Marshal Georgy Zhukov to the north of Totskoye village in Orenburg Oblast, Russia, in the South Ural Military District. The epicenter of the detonation is marked with a memorial.

== History ==
In mid-September 1954, nuclear bombing tests were performed at the Totskoye proving ground during the training exercise Snezhok (Russian: Снежок, Snowball or Light Snow) with some 45,000 people, all Soviet soldiers and officers, who explored the explosion site of a bomb twice as powerful as the one dropped on Nagasaki nine years earlier. After the first nuclear explosion, two additional non-nuclear bombs were exploded shortly after the main blast in order to imitate a second-wave nuclear strike.

The participants were carefully selected from Soviet military servicemen, informed that they would take part in an exercise with the use of a new kind of weapon, sworn to secrecy, and earned three months salary. A delegation of high-ranking government officials and senior military officers arrived to the region on the eve of the exercise, which included First Secretary Nikita Khrushchev and Marshals of the Soviet Union Nikolai Bulganin, Aleksandr Vasilevsky, Konstantin Rokossovsky, Ivan Konev and Rodion Malinovsky. The operation was commanded by Marshal of the Soviet Union Georgy Zhukov and initiated by the Soviet Ministry of Defense. At 9:33 a.m. on 14 September 1954, a Soviet Tu-4 bomber dropped a 40-kilotonne (170 TJ) atomic weapon—an RDS-4 bomb, which had been previously tested in 1951 at the Semipalatinsk Test Site—from 8,000 metres (26,000 ft). The bomb exploded 350 metres (1,150 ft) above Totskoye range, 13 kilometres (8 mi) from Totskoye.

The exercise involved the 270th Rifle Division, 320 planes, 600 tanks and self-propelled guns, 600 armoured personnel carriers, 500 artillery pieces and mortars and 6,000 automobiles.

Following the explosion, a Li-2 airplane was put to use on a reconnaissance mission to report the movement of a radioactive cloud produced by the blast, and the most dangerous areas were explored and marked by special reconnaissance troops. After the reconnaissance was complete and the Soviet command gained enough information on the level of radiation, the army moved in. The soldiers wore gas masks, protective suits and respirators, special gloves and capes and moved around the territory in armoured personnel carriers, holding a distance of 400–600 metres from the hypocenter and avoiding the most dangerous areas of the explosion site. They moved 400–500 metres from the hypocenter, whereas tanks and armoured personnel carriers came even closer.

However, the protective measures were insufficient. According to one veteran in a Soviet documentary of the event, "Some, the majority even, had no protective clothing, and besides it was impossible to use gas masks" [in the 115 degree temperatures of the area]. Additionally, insufficient care was taken to remove and dispose of contaminated clothing of the event. Evacuations were haphazard, where villagers who chose to stay were told to "dig ditches" to avoid effects. Yuri Sorokin filed suit in 1993 against the Russian government to receive compensation for medical injuries that he attributed to the exercise.

Sergey Zelentsov (1927–2017), a military officer who was the first to reach the middle of the hypocenter, described his experience in the following words: "Not reaching the area of strong radioactive contamination, we crossed the road which the columns of advancing troops had passed before us. It was empty and quiet around, only the radiometers were clicking, notifying us of the increased level of radiation. The troops proceeded past the hypocenter, outside of the area of severe radioactive contamination. Directly in the zone adjacent to the hypocenter of the explosion, the ground was covered with a thin glassy crust of melted sand, crunchy and breaking underfoot, like a thin ice on spring puddles after a night frost. And there were no footprints on it, except for my own. I walked quietly along this crust, since the radiometer registered a level of radioactivity not exceeding 1 R/h."

The residents of villages (Bogdanovka, Fyodorovka and others) that were situated around 6 km (4 mi) from the hypocenter of the future explosion were offered temporary evacuation outside the 50 km (31 mi) radius. The nearest villages were generally not affected by the blast, except for a number of houses located less than 8 km (5.0 mi) from the explosion site that caught fire and burned down. They were evacuated by the military and temporarily accommodated in military tents. During the exercise, the residents received daily payment, while their property was insured. Those of them who decided not to return after the operation was complete, were provided with newly built four-room furnished houses near the Samarka river or obtained financial compensation.

A few days afterwards, Soviet scientists received detailed reports on the test and began to study the impact of the nuclear blast on model houses, shelters, vehicles, vegetation and experimental animals affected by the explosion. On 17 September 1954, the Soviet newspaper Pravda published a report on the exercise: "In accordance with the plan of scientific and experimental works, a test of one of the types of nuclear weapons has been conducted in the Soviet Union in the last few days. The purpose of the test was to examine the effects of nuclear explosion. Valuable results have been obtained that will help Soviet scientists and engineers to successfully solve the task of protecting the country from nuclear attack". The results of the exercise were discussed at a scientific conference at the Kuybyshev Military Academy in Moscow and served as the basis for the Soviet program of defense against nuclear warfare.

== See also ==
- List of nuclear weapons tests of the Soviet Union
- Desert Rock exercises, the United States's closest counterpart.
