= RDS-3 =

Soviet free-falling nuclear bomb test

RDS-3 (Russian: РДС-3) was the third atomic bomb developed by the Soviet Union in 1951, after the RDS-1 and RDS-2. It was called Marya in the military. The bomb had a composite design with a plutonium core inside a uranium shell, providing an explosive power of 41.2 kilotons. The RDS-3T (РДС-3Т) was a modernized version and the first mass-produced nuclear weapon by the Soviet Union. It was assigned to Long Range Aviation in 1953.

== Testing ==
RDS-3 was tested on October 18, 1951, being air-dropped from a Tupolev Tu-4. It was the first such test of a nuclear device by the Soviets, known as Joe-3 in the West. It was detonated at an altitude of four hundred meters. The resulting flash could be seen from 170 km (110 mi) away, and the sound heard from around the same distance. The footage of the test was filmed by an instrument tower 7.5 kilometers from ground zero.

== See also ==
- Soviet atomic bomb project
- RDS-1
- RDS-2
- RDS-4
- RDS-37
- RDS-220 (Tsar Bomba)
