= Totsky District =

Totsky District Тоцкий район (Russian)
- District
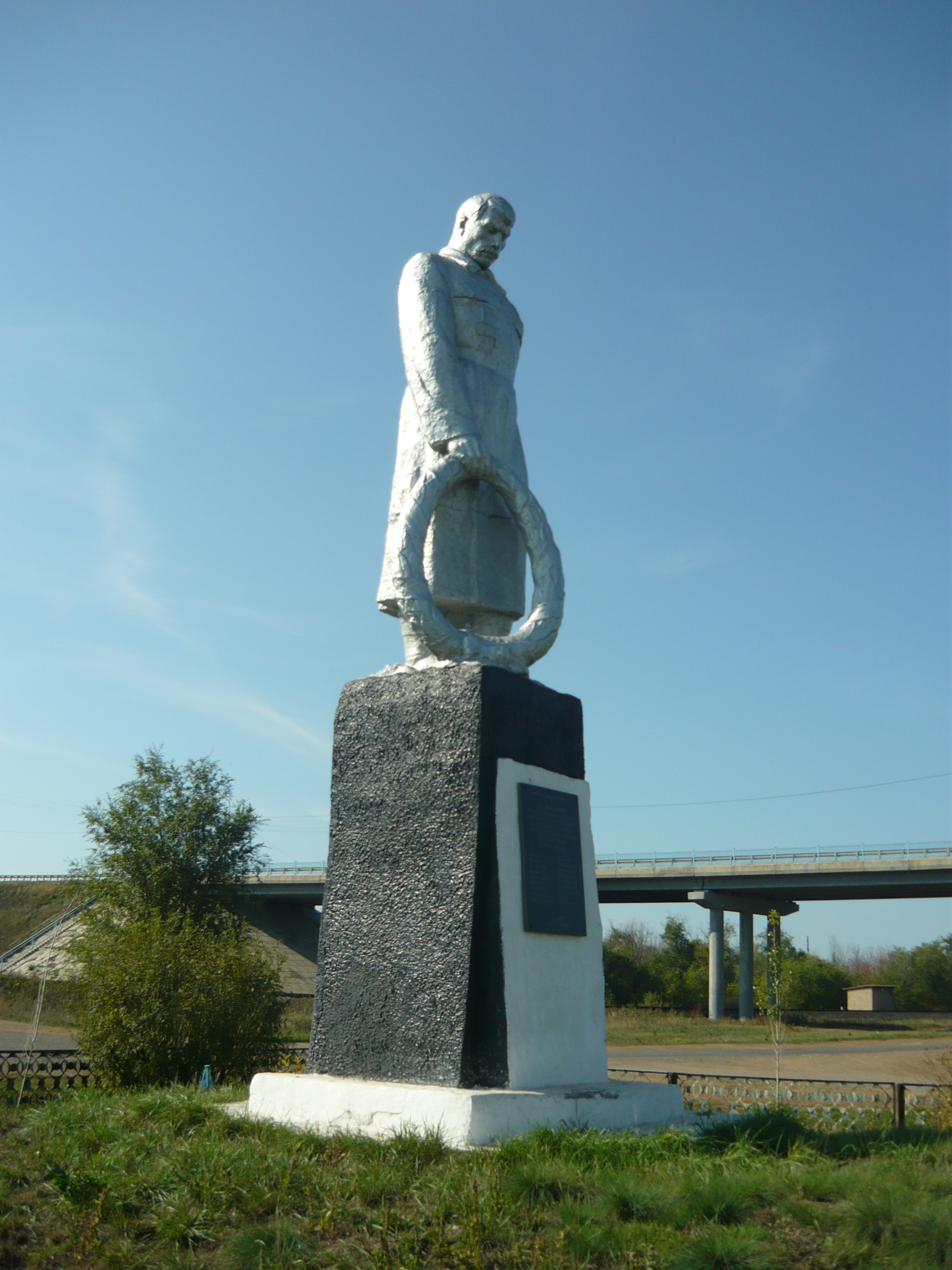
- War Memorial and Grave in Totsky District

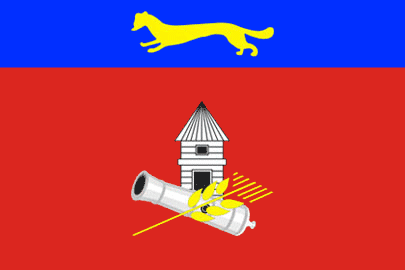
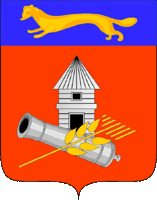
- Flag Coat of arms
- Location of Totsky District in Orenburg Oblast
- Coordinates: 52°31′31″N 52°44′58″E
- Country: Russia
- Federal subject: Orenburg Oblast
- Established: 16 July 1928
- Administrative center: Totskoye

Area
  - Total: 3,100 km^{2} (1,200 sq mi)

Population (2010 Census)
  - Total: 32,866
  - Density: 11/km^{2} (27/sq mi)
  - Urban: 0%
  - Rural: 100%

Administrative structure
  - Administrative divisions: 22 Selsoviets
  - Inhabited localities: 52 rural localities

Municipal structure
  - Municipally incorporated as: Totsky Municipal District
  - Municipal divisions: 0 urban settlements, 18 rural settlements
- Time zone: UTC+5 (MSK+2)
- OKTMO ID: 53652000
- Website: http://www.totskoe.org/

Totsky District (Russian: То́цкий райо́н) is an administrative and municipal district (raion), one of the thirty-five in Orenburg Oblast, Russia. It is located in the west of the oblast. The area of the district is 3,100 square kilometers (1,200 sq mi). Its administrative center is the rural locality (a selo) of Totskoye. Population: 32,866 (2010 Census); 41,332 (2002 census); 32,174 (1989 Soviet census). The population of Totskoye accounts for 21.0% of the district's total population.
