= Mining and Chemical Combine =

Russian Nuclear Facility (estab. 1950)

Coordinates: 56.3544°N 93.6439°E

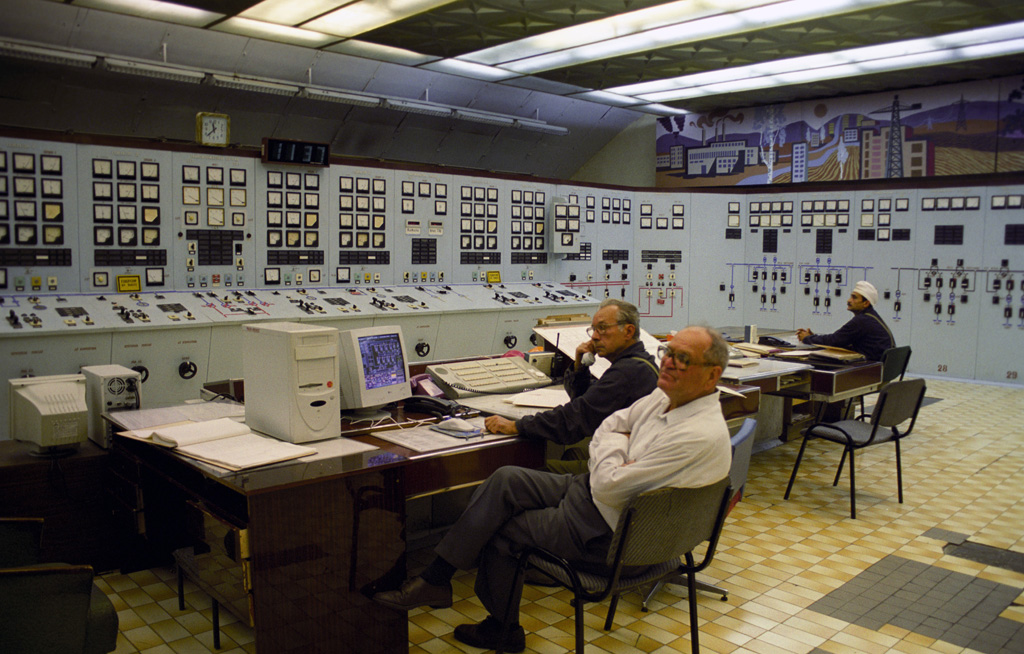
Control room at the MCC in Zheleznogorsk

The Mining and Chemical Combine is a nuclear facility in Russia. It was established in 1950 to produce plutonium for weapons. It is in the closed city Zheleznogorsk, Krasnoyarsk Krai. The company is currently part of the Rosatom group.

The site had three underground nuclear reactors using cooling water from the Yenisei river: AD (1958), ADE-1 (1961) and ADE-2 (1965). ADE-2 was shut down in 2010 in accord with the 1997 Plutonium Management and Disposition Agreement (Plutonium Production Reactor Agreement) with the United States. It also provided heat and electricity for the area, which was its main function after 1993.

The complex has an interim storage facility. There is also a 60 t/year commercial mixed oxide (MOX) fuel fabrication facility (MFFF). It employs 7000 people.

The MOX production line completed a 10 kg batch in September 2014.

The city has a Mining and Chemical Combine museum.
