= Totskoye =

Rural locality and administrative center of Totsky District, Orenburg Oblast, Russia

Totskoye То́цкое
- Rural locality
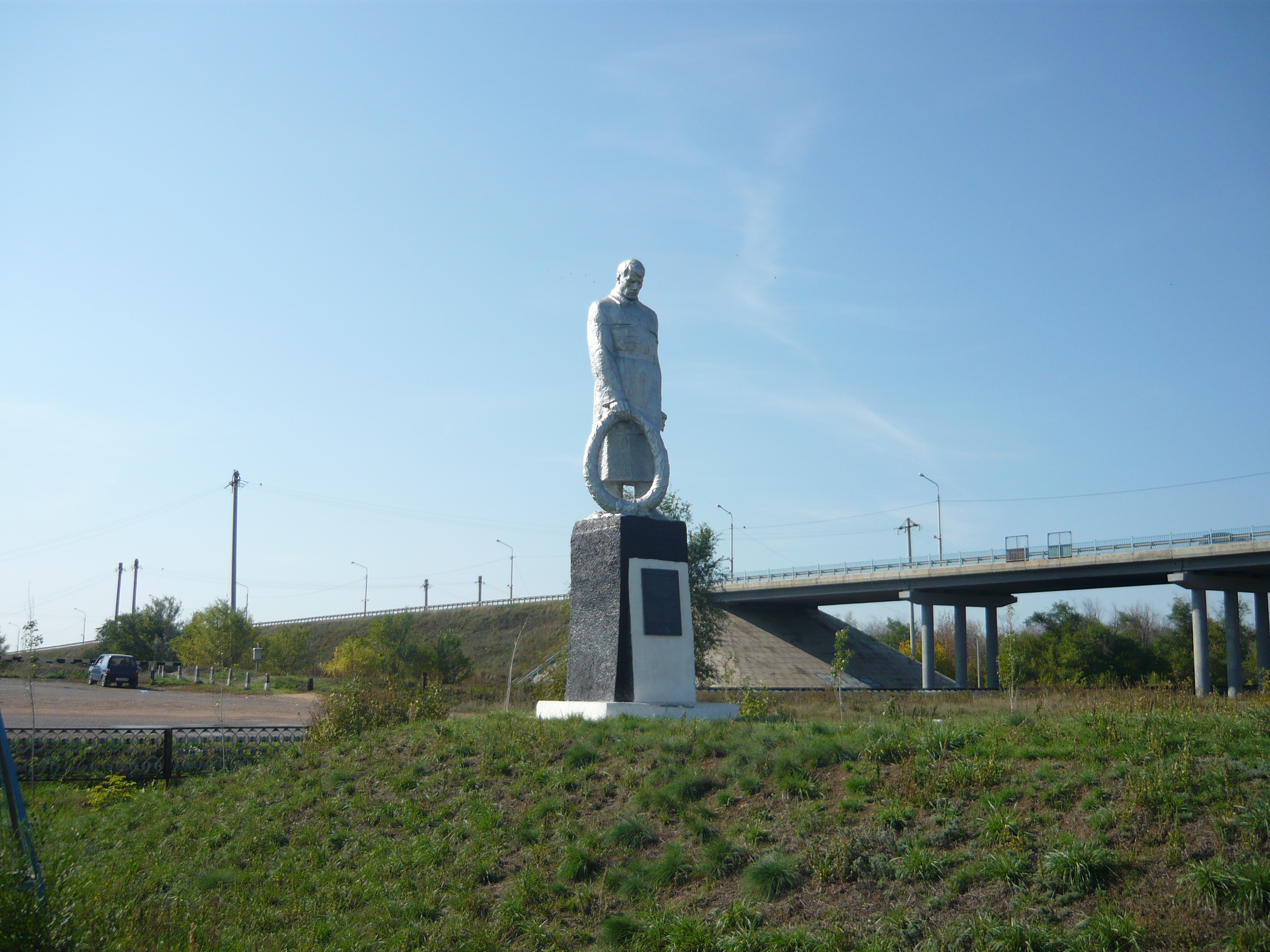
- Interactive map of Totskoye
- Location of Totskoye Totskoye (Russia)
- Coordinates: 52°31′47″N 52°44′52″E
- Country: Russia
- Federal subject: Orenburg Oblast
- Administrative district: Totsky
- Founded: August 1736
- Elevation: 85 m (279 ft)

Population
  - Estimate (2021): 7,892 )
- Time zone: UTC+5 (MSK+2)
- Postal code: 461131
- OKTMO ID: 53652449101

Totskoye (Russian: То́цкое) is a rural locality (a selo) and the administrative center of Totsky District of Orenburg Oblast, Russia. Population: 6,898 (2010 census); 7,201 (2002 census); 7,095 (1989 Soviet census).

== History ==
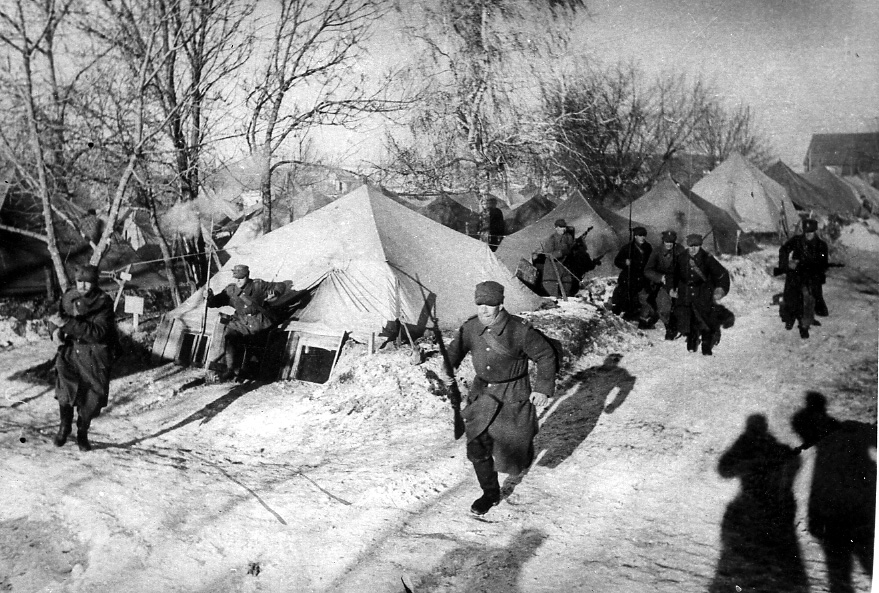
Polish military camp in 1941

The settlement was founded in 1736.

During World War I, it was the site of a prisoner-of-war camp that became notorious for a typhus epidemic in the winter of 1915-1916. More than 9,000 of 17,000 prisoners died. Czech writer Jaroslav Hašek was one of its survivors.

During World War II, it was the site of a prisoner-of-war camp for Polish prisoners. In 1941–1942, the 6th and 7th Infantry Divisions of the Polish Anders' Army were formed and stationed in Totskoye. Poles were housed in makeshift camps in dire conditions, mostly in tents and dugouts, and suffered from shortages of food, medicine, warm clothing and footwear. Due to extreme cold reaching −54 °C (−65 °F), the Poles were relocated to Shahrisabz and Karmana in early 1942. A monument for Polish soldiers is erected there.

In 1954, the Totskoye range was the site of the Soviet nuclear tests. Totskoye is also the site of the Totskoye air base.
