= Totsky range =

Russian shooting range

Coordinates: 52°38.54′N 52°48.55′E

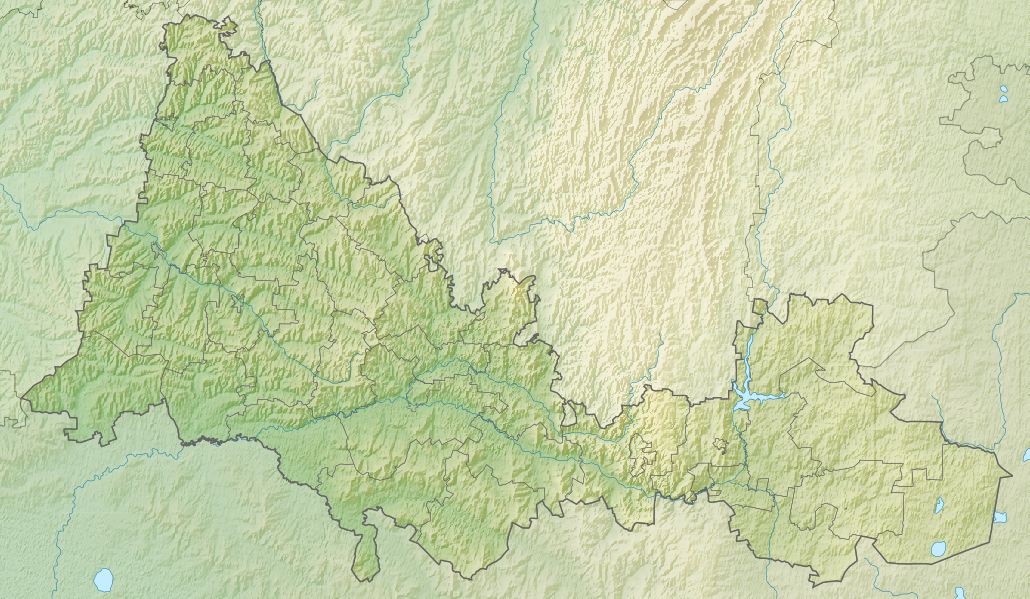
Totsky range
Totsky range (European Russia)
Totsky range (Russia)

BM-27 Uragans firing, 2018

The Totsky range (Russian: Тоцкий полигон), also Totskoye range in Western sources, is a military training area and shooting range in the Central Military District, Russia, near the village of Totskoye in the steppes of Orenburg Oblast. Its area is 45,700 hectares.

It is notable for the Soviet Totskoye nuclear exercise in 1954.

It was one of the locations where the Anders Army was formed in 1941.
