= RDS-4 =

Soviet nuclear bomb first tested in 1953

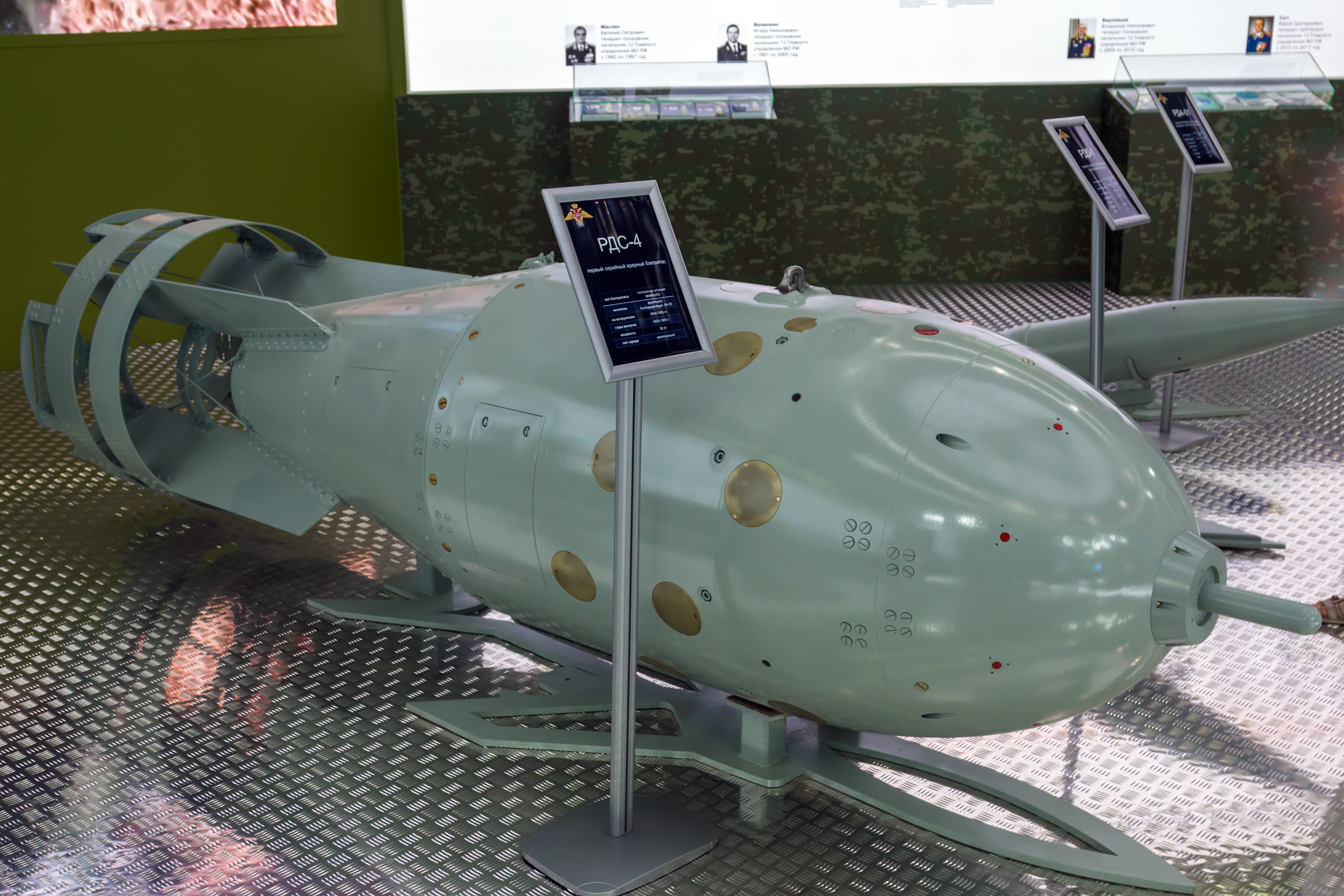
- RDS-4 Tatyana

Information
- Country: Soviet Union
- Test site: Semipalatinsk Test Site, Kazakh SSR
- Period: 23 August 1953
- Number of tests: 1
- Test type: Atmospheric test
- Device type: Fission
- Max. yield: Total yield 28 kilotons of TNT (120 TJ)

Test chronology

RDS-4 (Russian: РДС-4, also known as Tatyana) was a Soviet nuclear bomb that was first tested at Semipalatinsk Test Site, on August 23, 1953. The device weighed approximately 1,200 kilograms (2,646 lb). The device was approximately one-third the size of the RDS-3. The bomb was dropped from an IL-28 aircraft at an altitude of 11 kilometres (7 mi) and exploded at 600 metres (1,969 ft), with a yield of 28 kt.

The Soviet Union's first mass-produced tactical nuclear weapon was based on the RDS-4 and remained in service until 1966.It used a composite core of 4.2 kilograms (9 lb) Pu-239 and 6.8 kilograms (15 lb) 90% enriched U-235 and had a nominal yield of 30 kilotons. RDS-4 "Tatyana" turned out to be very compact - its weight (1200 kg) and dimensions were four times less than that of RDS-1, which allowed the new bomb to be taken into service not only by long-range aviation (Tupolev Tu-4, Tupolev Tu-95, Tupolev Tu-16, Tupolev Tu-22, Myasishchev M-4, and Myasishchev 3M), but also front-line (Ilyushin Il-28, Yakovlev Yak-26, Yakovlev Yak-28, Mikoyan-Gurevich MiG-19, and Mikoyan-Gurevich MiG-21). A tactical weapon based on the RDS-4 was also used on September 14, 1954 during Snowball military exercise at the Totsky range (similar to Western Desert Rock exercises), when the bomb was dropped by the Tu-4 bomber (the reverse-engineered Boeing B-29). The purpose of this exercise was not to test the bomb itself, but the ability of using it while breaking through enemy defenses (presumably in West Germany). After the explosion Soviet jet fighters were sent to fly through the mushroom cloud while tanks and infantry were forced to move through ground zero.

== See also ==
- Nuclear weapons program of the Soviet Union
- Soviet atomic bomb project
- RDS-3
- Mark 7 nuclear bomb
