= Walter Herrmann (physicist) =

German nuclear physicist (1910–1987)

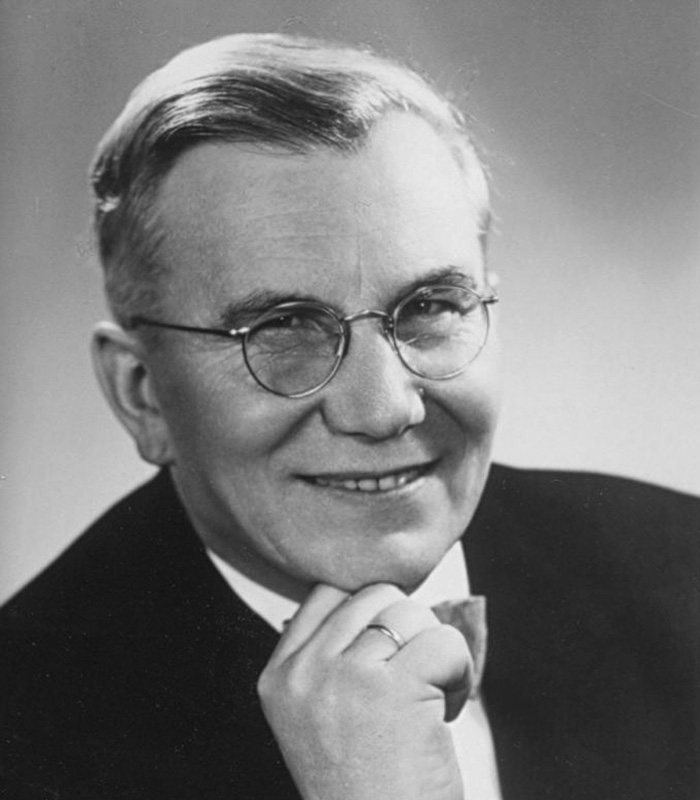
- Walter Herrmann (1910–1987) c. 1965
- Born: 20 September 1910; Querfurt, Saxony-Anhalt, Germany
- Died: 11 August 1987 (aged 76); Leipzig, Saxony, Germany
- Citizenship: Germany
- Education: Dresden University of Technology
- Known for: Soviet program of nuclear weapons
- Awards: National Prize (1958)
- Scientific career
- Fields: Mechanical engineering
- Workplaces: University of Magdeburg; Laboratory V Kaiser Wilhelm Institute; Auergesellschaft AG

Walter Herrmann (20 September 1910 – 11 August 1987) was a German nuclear physicist and mechanical engineer who was one of many German nuclear scientists in Soviet program of nuclear weapons, mainly working on the power plant technology at the Laboratory V in Russia.

After his release from the Soviet custody, he returned to Germany after accepting the teaching position as professor of mechanical engineering at the University of Magdeburg.

== Biography ==
There is very little known about Herrman's early life but the German-language Wikipedia noted that he was born in Querfurt, Saxony-Anhalt, 20 September 1910. His father, a banker, supported his studies when he went to attend the Dresden University of Technology and graduated with engineering degree in 1937.

== Career ==
=== Pre-War and Uranium Club ===
After completing his degree in engineering, Herrmann spent several years as a research engineer at the power plant located in Böhlen and Saxony where the Auergesellschaft AG once headquartered. In January 1939, he was transferred to Dresden, and due to his expertise in thermal engineering and knowledge in head transfer mechanism, he consulted to build the experimental power station located in Espenhain.

On 22 April 1939, after hearing a paper by Wilhelm Hanle on the use of uranium fission in a Uranmaschine (uranium machine, i.e., nuclear reactor), Georg Joos, along with Hanle, notified Wilhelm Dames, at the Reichserziehungsministerium (REM, Reich Ministry of Education), of potential military applications of nuclear energy. Just seven days later, a group, organized by Dames, met at the REM to discuss the potential of a sustained nuclear chain reaction. The group included the physicists Walther Bothe, Robert Döpel, Hans Geiger, Wolfgang Gentner, Wilhelm Hanle, Gerhard Hoffmann, and Joos. After this, informal work began at the Georg-August University of Göttingen, and the group of physicists was known informally as the first Uranverein (Uranium Club) and formally as Arbeitsgemeinschaft für Kernphysik. The second Uranverein began after the Heereswaffenamt (HWA, Army Ordnance Office) squeezed out the Reichsforschungsrat (RFR, Reich Research Council) of the REM and started the formal German nuclear energy project. The second Uranverein had its first meeting on 16 September 1939; the meeting was organized by Kurt Diebner and held in Berlin. It was then that Kaiser-Wilhelm Institut für Physik (KWIP, after World War II reorganized and renamed the Max Planck Institute for Physics), in Berlin-Dahlem, was placed under HWA authority, with Diebner as the administrative director, and the military control of the nuclear research commenced. Some of the research was carried out at the Versuchsstelle (testing station) of the HWA in Gottow; Diebner, was director of the facility. When it was apparent that the nuclear energy project would not make a decisive contribution to ending the war effort in the near term, control of the KWIP was returned to its umbrella organization, the Kaiser-Wilhelm Gesellschaft (KWG, after World War II renamed the Max-Planck Gesellschaft) in January 1942 and control of the project was relinquished to the RFR that year. However, the HWA did maintain its testing station in Gottow and continue research there until the end of the war.

It was at the Gottow facility that Herrmann participated in nuclear fission experiments designated G-I and G-III. The G-1 experiment had lattices of 6,800 uranium oxide cubes (about 25 tons) in the nuclear moderator paraffin. The work verified Karl Heinz Höcker's calculations that cubes were better than rods, and rods were better than plates. The G-III experiment was a small-scale design, but it generated an exceptionally high rate of neutron production. The G-III model was superior to nuclear fission chain reaction experiments that had been conducted at the KWIP in Berlin-Dahem, the University of Heidelberg, or the University of Leipzig. Herrmann also participated in work to explore the initiation of a nuclear reaction through the detonation of explosives.

=== Soviet program of nuclear weapons ===
Near the close of World War II, the Soviet Union sent special search teams into Germany to locate and deport German nuclear scientists or any others who could be of use to the Soviet atomic bomb project. The Russian Alsos teams were headed by NKVD Colonel General A. P. Zavenyagin and staffed with numerous scientists, from their only nuclear laboratory, attired in NKVD officer's uniforms. In the autumn of 1945, Heinz Pose was offered the opportunity to work in the Soviet Union, which he accepted. He arrived in the Soviet Union, with his family, in February 1946. He was to establish and head Laboratory V (also known by the code name Malojaroslavets-10, after the nearby town by the same name) in Obninsk. The scientific staff at Laboratory V was to be both Soviet and German, the former being mostly political prisoners from the Gulag or exiles; this type of facility is known as a sharashka. (Laboratory B by lake Sungul was also a sharashka and working on the Soviet atomic bomb project. Notable Germans at Laboratory B were Hans-Joachim Born, Alexander Catsch, Nikolaus Riehl, and Karl Zimmer. Notable Russians from the Gulag were N. V. Timofeev-Resovskij and S. A. Voznesenskij.)

On 5 March 1946, in order to staff his laboratory, Pose and NKVD General Kravchenko, along with two other officers, went to Germany for six months to hire scientists. Additionally, Pose procured equipment from the companies AEG, Carl Zeiss AG, Schott Jena, and Mansfeld, which were in the Russian occupation zone.

Pose planned 16 laboratories for his institute, which was to include a chemistry laboratory and eight laboratories. Three heads of laboratories, Czulius, Herrmann, and Rexer, were Pose's colleagues who worked with him at the German Army's testing station in Gottow, under the Uranverein project. (See below: Internal Reports.) Eight laboratories in the institute were:

- Heinz Pose's laboratory for nuclear processes.
- Werner Czulius's laboratory for uranium reactors.
- Walter Herrmann's laboratory for special issues of nuclear disintegration.
- Westmayer's laboratory for systematic nuclear reactions.
- Professor Carl Friedrich Weiss's laboratory for the study of natural and artificial radioactivity.
- Schmidt's laboratory to study methodologies for nuclear measurement.
- Professor Ernst Rexer's laboratory for applied nuclear physics.
- Hans Jürgen von Oertzen's laboratory to study cyclotrons and high voltage.

=== In Germany ===
When his time with the Soviet Nuclear Program was done, Herrmann returned to the DDR to focus on restoring the country's energy supply. In December 1945 he was ordered by the Soviet Military Administration in Germany to carry out the reconstruction of the nation's boiler plants.

In May 1953 he started a project to modernize the central steam generator in Berlin. As recognition for his service, and skill at restoring energy in the DDR Herrmann was sent to Hungary to manage the commissioning, designing, and construction of power plants.

In July 1956, Because of his merits and his many years of professional experience in power plant engineering, Herrmann was appointed a professor at the University of Magdeburg's school of mechanical engineering as the head and founder of the Institute of Thermal Engineering. At the beginning of the fall semester, 1960, Herrmann was elected as the Dean of Faculty of Mechanical Engineering.

In 1962, Hermann was made head of a group of experts tasked with the stabilization of the large-scale power plant in Lübbenau. In 1964, he was the initiator of the first-ever thermotechnical colloquia. In 1968, he was made the first Director of Apparatus and Plants at THMD. A particularly high honor of his scientific life's work, Herrmann was awarded an honorary doctorate from the Technical University of Dresden in 1976.

== Internal reports ==
The following reports were published in Kernphysikalische Forschungsberichte (Research Reports in Nuclear Physics), an internal publication of the German Uranverein. The reports were classified Top Secret, they had very limited distribution, and the authors were not allowed to keep copies. The reports were confiscated under the Allied Operation Alsos and sent to the United States Atomic Energy Commission for evaluation. In 1971, the reports were declassified and returned to Germany. The reports are available at the Karlsruhe Nuclear Research Center and the American Institute of Physics.

- F. Berkei, W. Borrmann, W. Czulius, Kurt Diebner, Georg Hartwig, K. H. Höcker, W. Herrmann, H. Pose, and Ernst Rexer Bericht über einen Würfelversuch mit Uranoxyd und Paraffin G-125 (dated before 26 November 1942)
- Kurt Diebner, Werner Czulius, W. Herrmann, Georg Hartwig, F. Berkei and E. Kamin Über die Neutronenvermehrung einer Anordnung aus Uranwürfeln und schwerem Wasser (G III) G-210
- Kurt Diebner, Georg Hartwig, W. Herrmann, H. Westmeyer, Werner Czulius, F. Berkei, and Karl-Heinz Höcker Vorläufige Mitteilung über einen Versuch mit Uranwüfeln und schwerem Eis als Bremssubstanz G-211 (April 1943)
- Kurt Diebner, Georg Hartwig, W. Herrmann, H. Westmeyer, Werner Czulius, F. Gerkei, and Karl-Heinz Höcker Bericht über einen Versuch mit Würfeln aus Uran-Metall und schwerem Eis G-212 (July 1943)
- W. Herrmann, Georg Hartwig, H. Rockwitz, W. Trinks, and H. Schaub Versuche über die Einleitung von Kernreaktionen durch die Wirkung explodierender Stoffe G-303 (1944)

== Bibliography ==
- Hentschel, Klaus (editor) and Ann M. Hentschel (editorial assistant and translator) Physics and National Socialism: An Anthology of Primary Sources (Birkhäuser, 1996) ISBN 0-8176-5312-0
- Kant, Horst Werner Heisenberg and the German Uranium Project / Otto Hahn and the Declarations of Mainau and Göttingen, Preprint 203 (Max-Planck Institut für Wissenschaftsgeschichte, 2002)
- Macrakis, Kristie Surviving the Swastika: Scientific Research in Nazi Germany (Oxford, 1993)
- Oleynikov, Pavel V. German Scientists in the Soviet Atomic Project, The Nonproliferation Review Volume 7, Number 2, 1 – 30 (2000). The author has been a group leader at the Institute of Technical Physics of the Russian Federal Nuclear Center in Snezhinsk (Chelyabinsk-70).
- Walker, Mark German National Socialism and the Quest for Nuclear Power 1939–1949 (Cambridge, 1993) ISBN 0-521-43804-7
