= Laboratory B =

Soviet nuclear research site, 1946–1955

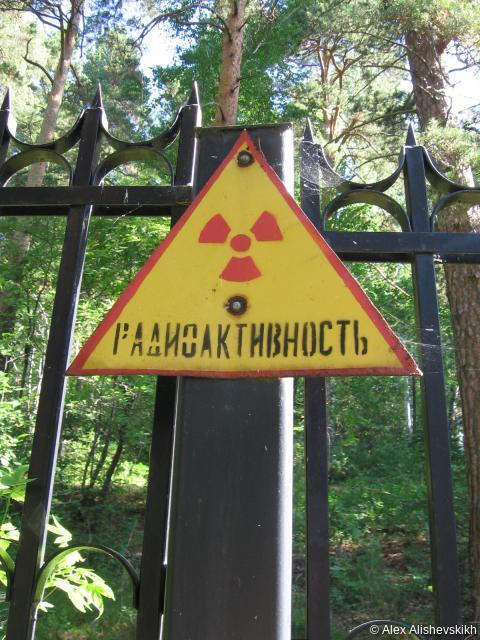
The Radioactivity warning sign left at the now-ruined and abandoned Laboratory B, ca. 2009

Laboratory B (Russian: Лаборатория Б), also known as Object B‌ (Объект Б) or Object 2011 during its period of operation, was a former Soviet nuclear research site constructed in 1946 by Lake Sungul in Chelyabinsk Oblast, Russia. Operated under the 9th Chief Directorate of the Soviet Ministry of Internal Affairs, it was a major site for the Soviet program of nuclear weapons that works on handling, treatment, and the use of the radioactive products generated in reactors, as well as radiation biology, dosimetry, and radiochemistry. It had two divisions: radiochemistry and radiobiophysics; the latter was headed by N. V. Timofeev-Resovskij.

Laboratory B was run as a sharashka (a closed research facility run as a prison), with at least ten of its German staff classified as prisoners of war from World War II. For two years, the German chemist Nikolaus Riehl was the scientific director.

It was closed in 1955, and has since been abandoned and left as a ruin.

== Creation ==
From early in 1945, Colonel General A. P. Zavenyagin, as head of the 9th Chief Directorate of the NKVD (MVD after 1946), was responsible for the acquisition of German scientists, equipment, materiel, and intellectual property, under the Russian Alsos, to help Russia with the Soviet atomic bomb project. The issue of Decree No. 9877 from the Council of Ministers on 20 August 1945 created a special committee of which Zavenyagin was a member, (Note: Members of the Special Committee were: Lavrentiy Beria, Chairman of the Special Committee; Mikhail Pervukhin, Deputy Chairman of the Council of People's Commissars (Sovnarkom, Sovet Narodnykh Komissarov) after 1946, the Council of Ministers (Sovmin, Sovet Ministrov); Nikolai Voznesensky, Chairman of the State Committee for Planning (Gosplan, Gosudarstvennyj Komitet po Planirovaniyu); Georgy Malenkov, Secretary of the Communist Party of the Soviet Union; B. L. Makhnev, Secretary of the Special Committee; Pyotr Kapitsa, Director of the Institute for Physical Problems of the Academy of Sciences. Kapitsa requested to be taken off of the Special Committee due to disagreements with Beria. Kapitsa's first request was denied, but the second was approved.; Avraami Zavenyagin, head of the 9th Chief Directorate of the NKVD (a deputy of the People's Commissar for Internal Affairs); Igor Kurchatov, head of Laboratory No. 2 and the scientific supervisor for the Soviet atomic bomb project. with special and extraordinary powers for solving problems related to the atomic bomb project.) Zavenyagin was responsible for establishing, building, managing, and providing security for facilities supporting the atomic bomb project. Zavenyagin's purview also included the resources of the Gulag; some of the facilities to which the German scientists were assigned were run as a sharashka. German scientists were available for recruitment from the Soviet occupation zone in Germany. Also, immediately after World War II and extending into 1949, the Russians also had a large pool of German PoW scientists and highly skilled specialists from which to recruit; the main camp was at Krasnogorsk.

Facilities to which the German scientists were assigned were under the under authority of the 9th Chief Directorate and included the following (with annotations of prominent Germans at the facilities):

- Laboratory 2 (later known as the Kurchatov Institute of Atomic Energy and today as the Russian Scientific Center "Kurchatov Institute") in Moscow. – Josef Schintlmeister.
- Scientific Research Institute No. 9 (NII-9; today the Bochvar All-Russian Scientific Research Institute of Inorganic Materials, Bochvar VNIINM) in Moscow – Max Volmer and Robert Döpel.
- Elektrostal' Plant No. 12 – A. Baroni (PoW), Hans-Joachim Born (PoW), Alexander Catsch (PoW), Werner Kirst, H. E. Ortmann, Przybilla, Nikolaus Riehl, Herbert Schmitz (PoW), Herbert Thieme, Tobein, Günter Wirths, and Karl Zimmer (PoW).
- Institutes A (in Sinop, a suburb of Sukhumi) and G (in Agudzery) created for Manfred von Ardenne and Gustav Hertz, respectively. Institutes A and G were later used as the basis for the Sukhumi Physico-Technical Institute (SFTI); today it is the State Scientific Production Association "SFTI". Institute A – Ingrid Schilling, Fritz Schimohr, Fritz Schmidt, Gerhard Siewert, Max Steenbeck (PoW), Peter Adolf Thiessen, and Karl-Franz Zühlke. Institute G – Heinz Barwich, Werner Hartmann, and Justus Mühlenpfordt.
- Laboratory V was created for Heinz Pose in Obninsk, and it was run as a sharashka. Laboratory V was later renamed the Physics and Power Engineering Institute (FEhI or IPPE); today the "State Scientific Center of the Russian Federation - A.I. Leipunsky Physics and Power Engineering Institute" (JSC SSC RF - FEI) – Werner Czulius, Walter Hermann, Hans Jürgen von Oertzen, Ernst Rexer, Karl-Heinrich Riewe, and Carl Friedrich Weiss.
- Laboratory B in Sungul' was established by a decree of the Council of Ministers in 1946, and it was run as a Sharashka. In 1955, it was assimilated into a new, second nuclear weapons institute, Scientific Research Institute-1011 (NII-1011), today known as the Russian Federal Nuclear Center All-Russian Scientific Research Institute of Technical Physics (RFYaTs–VNIITF). – Hans-Joachim Born (PoW), Alexander Catsch (PoW), Willi Lange, Nikolaus Riehl, and Karl Zimmer (PoW).

== Research conducted ==
Laboratory B had two scientific divisions, a radiobiophysics division headed by the geneticist N. V. Timofeev-Resovskij (prisoner), and a radiochemistry division headed by Sergej Aleksandrovich Voznesenskij (prisoner).

=== Radiobiophysics ===
In 1925, as the Russian part of a collaborative effort between Russia and Germany, the Russians sent Timofeev-Resovskij, and his colleague Sergei Romanovich Tsarapkin, to Germany. There, they worked with Oskar Vogt, director of the Kaiser-Wilhelm Institut für Hirnforschung (KWIH, Kaiser Wilhelm Institute for Brain Research), to establish the Abteilung für Experimentelle Genetik (Department of Experimental Genetics) and Timofeev-Resovskij became its director. Timofeev-Resovskij stayed in Germany through World War II, and built his department to world-renowned status. On the basis of false denunciations, Timofeev-Resovskij and Tsarapkin were arrested by the NKVD in September 1945, returned to Russia, and both sentenced to 10 years in the Gulag. They ended up in the Karaganda prison camp in northern Kazakhstan, one of the most terrible camps in the Gulag; the harsh conditions of Timofeev-Resovskij's transportation and incarceration in the labor camp contributed to a significant decline in his health, including the degradation of his vision brought on by malnutrition. Colonel General Zavenyagin, who had intended to utilize Timofeev-Resovskij's talents in the Soviet atomic bomb project, had Timofeev-Resovskij and Tsarapkin sent to Laboratory B in 1947. Timofeev-Resovskij's wife Elena Aleksandrovna, after receipt of a letter in his handwriting, left Berlin in 1948, with their son Andrew, to join him in Sungul'. The house occupied by the three Timofeev-Resovskijs was every bit as nice as that planned for the German scientists working at the Sungul' institute. (In 1992, Timofeev-Resovskij was rehabilitated, 11 years after his death!)

Born, Catsch, and Zimmer, who had worked for Timofeev-Resovskij in Berlin and who were sent to Laboratory B by Riehl in December 1947, were able to conduct work similar to that which they had done in Germany, and all three became section heads in Timofeev-Resovskij's department. Born examined fission products, developed methods of separating plutonium from fission products created in a nuclear reactor, and investigated and developed radiation health and safety measures. Catsch began his work on developing methods to extract radionucleotides from various organs, which he would continue when he left Russia.

The radiobiophysics division under Timofeev-Resovskij had four sections which conducted experimental studies in four basic directions:

- Effects of radioactive isotopes on animals.
- Cytological effects of radiation on plants and animals.
- Effects of weak concentrations of radioactive materials and low doses of ionizing radiation, mainly on crop cultivated plants.
- Effects of the distribution and accumulation of different radioactive materials introduced into the soil, ground water, and freshwater bodies.

The agrobiological and hydrobiological experiments were united on the general basis of the biogeochemical analysis of the experimentally created elementary biogeocenosis and the introduction of special factor radioactive materials into it.

=== Radiochemistry ===
On the basis of a false denunciation, Sergej Aleksandrovich Voznesenskij was arrested in June 1941; in April 1942, he was sentenced to 10 years in the Gulag. From March 1943 to 1947, he led a research group in the 4th Special Department of the NKVD in Moscow; the 4th Special Department provided military research and development by utilizing specialist prisoners, i.e., scientists. In December 1947, he was transferred to Laboratory B to head up the radiochemistry division. With the liquidation of Laboratory B and its merger into NII-1011 in 1955, Voznesenskij was transferred to the Ural Polytechnical Institute to head up the Department of Radiochemistry, and was simultaneously appointed as a scientific consultant at Combine No. 817 on problems of radioactive waste cleanup. (Voznesenskij had been fully rehabilitate in May 1953.)

The radiochemistry division had four sections and conducted research and development in the following areas:

- Development of methods of cleaning radioactive waste water.
- Development of the most appropriate structures for the storage of radioactive waste.
- Study of radioactive isotope ion exchange.
- Development of spectroscopic methods for the analysis of complex mixtures of radioactive components.
- Study of the precipitation of radioactive fragments.
- Development of methods to obtain clean (chistykh) isotopic preparations from the solutions of fission fragments of uranium, supplied by Combine No. 817 in nearby Ozersk.

== Overview ==
Owing to its proximity to the radiochemical plutonium facility Combine No. 817, the scientists at the institute had access to high-dose radioactive materials.

The scientific staff at Laboratory B – a Sharashka – was both Soviet and German, the former being mostly political prisoners or exiles, although some of the service staff were criminals – one had been convicted of murder. In 1955, the institute had 451 staff members; in 1946 there had been 95. The institute had a maximum of 26 German scientists, and more than 10 of them initially were classified as PoWs. The German contingent left the institute in 1953. The institute had two departments: radiobiophysics (No. 1) and radiochemistry (No. 2). In 1955, the institute was merged into the newly created second nuclear weapons design institute Nauchno-Issledovatel'skij Institut-1011 (NII-1011). During the merger, the radiopathology section of the radiochemistry department was transferred to Combine No. 817 (Ozersk) and a section of the radiobiophysics department was transferred to the Ural Branch of the USSR Academy of Sciences.

Accomplishments of Laboratory B include the development of technology for the isolation of fission by-products such as strontium-90, caesium-137, zirconium-65, and the technology to remove these isotopes from chemical compounds.

== Personnel ==
=== Directors ===
The first director of Laboratory B, starting in 1946, was MVD Colonel Alexander Konstantinovich Uralets, who had previously worked on the Soviet atomic bomb project. He received the Order of Lenin for his management of Laboratory B.

From 26 December 1952 to 14 June 1955, the director was the chemist Gleb Arkad'evich Sereda.

=== Scientific directors ===
Nikolaus Riehl was the scientific director of Laboratory B from September 1950 to early autumn in 1952.

Riehl, scientific director of the Auergesellschaft, was sent by the Russians, in 1945, to head a group at Plant No. 12 in Ehlektrostal' to develop an industrial process for production of reactor-grade uranium. Other Germans sent to work there included A. Baroni (PoW), Werner Kirst, Henry E. Ortmann (chemist from Auergesellschaft), Przybilla, Herbert Schmitz (PoW), Herbert Thieme, Tobein, and Günter Wirths (chemist from Auergesellschaft). When Riehl learned that professional colleagues from the Kaiser-Wilhelm Institut für Hirnforschung (Kaiser Wilhelm Institute for Brain Research) in Berlin, Hans-Joachim Born and Karl Zimmer, were being held in Krasnogorsk, in the main PoW camp for Germans with scientific degrees, Riehl arranged though Zavenyagin to have them sent to Ehlektrostal'. Alexander Catsch was also sent there. At Ehlektrostal', Riehl had a hard time incorporating Born, Catsch, and Zimmer into his tasking on uranium production, as Born was a radiochemist, Catsch was a physician and radiation biologist, and Zimmer was a physicist and radiation biologist; in December 1947, Riehl sent all three to Laboratory B to work with Timofeev-Resovskij.

After the detonation of the Russian uranium bomb, uranium production was going smoothly and Riehl's oversight was no longer necessary at Plant No. 12. Riehl then went, in 1950, to be the scientific director of Laboratory B, where he stayed until 1952. Essentially the remaining personnel in his Ehlektrostal' group were assigned elsewhere, with the exception of Henry E. Ortmann, A. Baroni (PoW), and Herbert Schmitz (PoW), who went with Riehl to Sungul'.

Besides those already mentioned, other Germans at Laboratory were Rinatia von Ardenne (sister of Manfred von Ardenne, director of Institute A, in Sukhumi) Wilhelm Menke (botanist), Willi Lange (who married the widow of Karl-Heinrich Riewe, who had been at Heinz Pose's Laboratory V, in Obninsk), Joachim Pani, and K. K. Rintelen. Until Riehl's return to Germany in June 1955, which Riehl had to request and negotiate, he was quarantined in Agudzery (Agudseri) starting in 1952; Augudzery, was the location of Institute G.

== Laboratory “B” in culture ==
- In 2021, as part of the 6th Ural Industrial Biennial of Contemporary Art, Russian artist Pavel Otdelnov created the installation The Ringing Trace in the former dormitory building of Laboratory “B”. One section of the installation was specifically dedicated to the history and legacy of Laboratory “B”.
- In 2023, playwright Irina Vaskovskaya and director Dmitry Zimin created the audio play Sungul: A Tale of the Past, based on the memoirs of Argenta Titlyanova, Scattered Pages. The project was presented as part of a cultural programme engaging with the historical traces of the Soviet nuclear project, including the legacy of Laboratory “B”.
- In 2023, the documentary film Laboratory “B”, directed by Margarita Khizhnyak, was released. The film is based on the memoirs of Argenta Titlyanova and draws on declassified archival materials related to the history of Laboratory “B”.
- In 2025, the documentary film Atomic Alphabet: Laboratory “B”, directed by Anatoly Terentyev, premiered in Snezhinsk. The film focuses on the historical role of Laboratory “B” within the Soviet nuclear project.

== Bibliography ==
- Albrecht, Ulrich, Andreas Heinemann-Grüder, and Arend Wellmann Die Spezialisten: Deutsche Naturwissenschaftler und Techniker in der Sowjetunion nach 1945 (Dietz, 1992, 2001) ISBN 3-320-01788-8
- Babkov, V. V. Nikolaj Vladimiorovich Timofeev-Resovskij [In Russian], Vestnik VOGiS Article 5, Number 15, 8-14 (2000)
- Emel'yanov, B. M. and V. S. Gavril'chenko (editors) Laboratory B. The Sungul' Phenomena. [In Russian] (RFYaTs-VNIITF, 2000) ISBN 5-85165-428-7
- Izvarina, E. Nuclear project in the Urals: History in Photographs [In Russian] (Okonchanie. Nachalo v No. 12) (Russian Academy of Sciences, Ural Branch, 2006)
- Knight, Amy "Beria, Stalin's First Lieutenant" (Princeton, 1993)
- Kozubov, G. Sungul' Conference, August 2000, Vestnik Instituta Biologii Komi NTs UrO RAN Issue 36, 2000
- Kruglov, Arkadii The History of the Soviet Atomic Industry (Taylor and Francis, 2002)
- Maddrell, Paul "Spying on Science: Western Intelligence in Divided Germany 1945 – 1961" (Oxford, 2006) ISBN 0-19-926750-2
- Medvedev, Zhores A. Nikolai Wladimirovich Timofeeff-Ressovsky (1900-1981), Genetics Volume 100, Number 1, 1-5 (1982)
- Naimark, Norman M. The Russians in Germany: A History of the Soviet Zone of Occupation, 1945-1949 (Belknap, 1995)
- Oleynikov, Pavel V. German Scientists in the Soviet Atomic Project, The Nonproliferation Review Volume 7, Number 2, 1 – 30 (2000). The author has been a group leader at the Institute of Technical Physics of the Russian Federal Nuclear Center in Snezhinsk (Chelyabinsk-70).
- Paul, Diane B. and Costas B. Krimbas Nikolai V. Timofeeff-Ressovsky, Scientific American Volume 266, Number 2, 86-92 (1992)
- Penzina, V. V. Archive of the Russian Federal Nuclear Center of the All-Russian Scientific Research Institute of Technical Physics, named after E. I. Zababakhin. Resource No. 1 – Laboratory "B". [In Russian] (VNIITF). Penzina is cited as head of the VNIITF Archive in Snezhinsk.
- Polunin, V. V. and V. A. Staroverov Personnel of Special Services in the Soviet Atomic Project 1945 – 1953 [In Russian] (FSB, 2004)
- Ratner, V. A. Session in Memory of N. V. Timofeev-Resovskij in the Institute of Cytology and Genetics of the Siberian Department of the Russian Academy of Sciences [In Russian], Vestnik VOGis Article 4, No. 15 (2000).
- Riehl, Nikolaus and Frederick Seitz Stalin's Captive: Nikolaus Riehl and the Soviet Race for the Bomb (American Chemical Society and the Chemical Heritage Foundations, 1996) ISBN 0-8412-3310-1.
- Timofeev-Resovskij, N. V. Kratkaya Avtobiograficheskaya Zapiska (Brief Autobiographical Note) (14 October 1977).
- Vazhnov, M. Ya. A. P. Zavenyagin: Pages from His Life (chapters from the book) [In Russian]`.
- Vogt, Annette Ein russisches Forscherehepaar in Berlin-Buch, Edition Luisenstadt (1998)
