= Hans-Joachim Born =

German chemist (1909–1987)

- Born: May 8, 1909; Berlin, Germany
- Died: April 15, 1987 (aged 77); Munich, Bavaria, Germany
- Siglum: H. J. Born
- Citizenship: Germany
- Education: Friedrich Wilhelm University of Berlin; University of Tübingen; University of Jena
- Known for: Soviet program of nuclear weapons Soviet program of biological weapons
- Scientific career
- Fields: Radiochemistry
- Workplaces: Technical University of Munich; Technical University Dresden; German Academy of Sciences at Berlin; Plant No. 12 in Russia; Auergesellschaft AG; Kaiser Wilhelm Society for the Advancement of Science
- Thesis: Über den Bleigehalt der norddeutschen Salzlager und seine Beziehungen zu radioaktiven Fragen (1935)
- Doctoral advisor: Otto Hahn

Hans-Joachim Born (8 May 1909 – 15 April 1987), was a German radiochemist and a professor of chemistry at the Technical University of Munich who was one of the senior German nuclear scientists in the Soviet program of nuclear weapons, and later his research was used in the Soviet program of biological weapons.

Until the end of the World War II, Born was a professional colleague of Soviet biologist, Nikolay Timofeev-Ressovsky, where he investigated the genome and genetic structures. After taken into the Soviet custody and held in Russia where he first worked at the Plant No. 12 in Ehlektrostal’, but later posted at the Laboratory B in Singul' to work on radiation biochemistry under Timofeev-Ressovsky in 1947.

After accepting a teaching position in 1955, Born was returned to Germany and settled in Dresden (later Munich) where he pioneered studies in advancing the field of radiochemistry.

== Biography ==
Born was born in Berlin on 8 May 1909, and attended the Friedrich Wilhelm University of Berlin and University of Tübingen where he graduated with degrees in chemistry. He went on to attend the doctoral program in chemistry at the University of Jena under radiochemist Otto Hahn and did his fundamental research at the Kaiser Wilhelm for Chemistry. In 1935, he was awarded his doctorate in radiochemistry on the topics of the lead content of the North German salt deposits and its relationship to radioactive questions.

During his university years, Born was a supporter of the Nazi Party and member of its paramilitary wing, the Storm Troopers, and also held membership of the German Labour Front.

== Career ==
=== In Germany ===
Born worked at the Kaiser-Wilhelm-Institut für Hirnforschung (KWIH, Kaiser Wilhelm Institute for Brain Research) of the Kaiser-Wilhelm Gesellschaft, in Berlin-Buch. At the KWIH, he was in Nikolaj Vladimirovich Timofeev-Resovskij's Abteilung für Experimentelle Genetik (Department for Experimental Genetics), a world-renowned department with the status of an institute. At the KWIH, Born examined the distribution of Radionuclides in the organs of rodents, and he also worked with fission products from research programs conducted under Nikolaus Riehl, scientific director of the Auergesellschaft, who was a participant in the German nuclear energy project Uranverein.

What happened to Born after the Russians entered Berlin, at the close of World War II, is best understood in the context of his colleague Karl Zimmer at the KWIH, who also had a professional relationship with Nikolaus Riehl at the Auergesellschaft.

At the close of World War II, Russia had special search teams operating in Austria and Germany, especially in Berlin, to identify and "requisition" equipment, materiel, intellectual property, and personnel useful to the Soviet atomic bomb project. The exploitation teams were under the Russian Alsos, and they were headed by Lavrenij Beria's deputy, Colonel General A. P. Zavenyagin. These teams were composed of scientific staff members, in NKVD officer's uniforms, from the bomb project's only laboratory, Laboratory No. 2, in Moscow. In mid-May 1945, the Russian nuclear physicists Georgy Flerov and Lev Artsimovich, in NKVD colonel's uniforms, compelled Zimmer to take them to the location of Riehl and his staff, who had evacuated their Auergesellschaft facilities and were west of Berlin, hoping to be in an area occupied by the American or British military forces. Riehl was detained at the search team's facility in Berlin-Friedrichshagen for a week. This sojourn in Berlin turned into 10 years in the Soviet Union! Riehl and his staff, including their families, were flown to Moscow on 9 July 1945. Riehl was to head up a group at Plant No. 12 in Ehlektrostal’ (Электросталь).

=== In Russia ===
From 1945 to 1950, Riehl was in charge of a group at Plant No. 12 in Ehlektrostal', which had been assigned the task of industrializing reactor-grade uranium production. When Riehl learned that H. J. Born and Karl Zimmer were being held in Krasnogorsk, in the main PoW camp for Germans with scientific degrees, Riehl arranged though Zavenyagin to have them sent to Ehlektrostal’. Alexander Catsch, who had been taken prisoner with Zimmer, was also sent to the Ehlektrostal’ Plant No. 12. Riehl had a hard time incorporating Born, Catsch, and Zimmer into his tasking on uranium production, as Born was a radiochemist, Catsch was a physician and radiation biologist, and Zimmer was a physicist and radiation biologist. Born's family arrived in Ehlektrostal’ on 20 August 1946.

After the detonation of the Russian uranium bomb, uranium production was going smoothly and Riehl's oversight was no longer necessary at Plant No. 12. Riehl then went, in 1950, to head an institute in Sungul', where he stayed until 1952. Essentially the remaining personnel in his group were assigned elsewhere, with the exception of H. E. Ortmann, A. Baroni (PoW), and Herbert Schmitz (PoW), who went with Riehl. However, Riehl had already sent Born, Catsch, and Zimmer to the institute in December 1947. The institute in Sungul’ was responsible for the handling, treatment, and use of radioactive products generated in reactors, as well as radiation biology, dosimetry, and radiochemistry. The institute was known as Laboratory B, and it was overseen by the 9th Chief Directorate of the NKVD (MVD after 1946), the same organization which oversaw the Russian Alsos operation. The scientific staff of Laboratory B – a ShARAShKA – was both Soviet and German, the former being mostly political prisoners or exiles, although some of the service staff were criminals. (Laboratory V, in Obninsk, headed by Heinz Pose, was also a sharashka and working on the Soviet atomic bomb project. Other notable Germans at the facility were Werner Czulius, Hans Jürgen von Oertzen, Ernst Rexer, and Carl Friedrich Weiss.)

Laboratory B was known under another cover name as Объект 0211 (Ob’ekt 0211, Object 0211), as well as Object B. (In 1955, Laboratory B was closed. Some of its personnel were transferred elsewhere, but most of them were assimilated into a new, second nuclear weapons institute, Scientific Research Institute-1011, NII-1011, today known as the Russian Federal Nuclear Center All-Russian Scientific Research Institute of Technical Physics, RFYaTs–VNIITF. NII-1011 had the designation предприятие п/я 0215, i.e., enterprise post office box 0215 and Объект 0215; the latter designation has also been used in reference to Laboratory B after its closure and assimilation into NII-1011.)

One of the political prisoners in Laboratory B was Riehls’ colleague from the KWIH, N. V. Timofeev-Resovskij, who, as a Soviet citizen, was arrested by the Soviet forces in Berlin at the conclusion of the war, and he was sentenced to 10 years in the Gulag. In 1947, Timofeev-Resovskij was rescued out of a harsh Gulag prison camp, nursed back to health, and sent to Sungul' to complete his sentence, but still make a contribution to the Soviet atomic bomb project. At Laboratory B, Timofeev-Resovskij headed a biophysics research department, in which Born, Catsch, and Zimmer were able to conduct work similar to that which they had done in Germany, and all three became section heads in Timofeev-Resovskij's department. Specifically, Born examined fission products, developed methods of separating plutonium from fission products created in a nuclear reactor, and investigated and developed radiation health and safety measures.

In preparation for release from the Soviet Union, it was standard practice to put personnel into quarantine for a few years if they worked on projects related to the Soviet atomic bomb project, as was the case for Born. Additionally, in 1954, the Deutsche Demokratische Republik (German Democratic Republic, GDR) and the Soviet Union prepared a list of scientists they wished to keep in the GDR, due to their having worked on projects related to the Soviet atomic bomb project; this list was known as the "A-list". On this A-list were the names of 18 scientists. Nine, possibly 10, of the names were associated with the Riehl group which worked at Plant No. 12 in Ehlektrostal’. Born, Catsch, Riehl, and Zimmer were on the list.

=== In Germany again ===
Born returned to Germany in the mid-1950s and eventually went West. Riehl arrived in the GDR on 4 April 1955, and by early June he was in the Federal Republic of Germany (FRG). Other colleagues of Riehl who worked with him in Russia also went West; Alexander Catsch went to the Federal Republic of Germany (FRG), Günter Wirths fled to the FRG and Karl Zimmer went legally.

Upon arrival in the DDR, Born became the director of the Institut für Angewandte Isotopenforschung (Institute for Applied Isotope Research) in Berlin-Buch. He also completed his Habilitation at the Technische Hochschule Dresden (after a reorganization and renaming in 1961: Technische Universität Dresden), where he then became a professor on the Fakultät für Kerntechnik (Faculty for Nuclear Technology). In 1957, he received and accepted a call to become a professor of radiochemistry at the Technische Hochschule München, which in 1970 was reorganized and renamed the Technical University of Munich. At the Technische Hochschule, he was affiliated with the Institut für Radiochemie. Born died in Munich.

== Selected publications ==
The majority of these literature citations have been garnered by searching on variations of the author's name on Google, Google Scholar, and the Energy Citations Database.

- H. J. Born Title Experiments with Radioactive Phosphorus in Rats [In German], Naturwissenschaften Volume 28, 476 (1940)
- H. J. Born, N. W. Timofeeff-Ressovsky, and K. G. Zimmer Anwendungen der Neutronen und der künstlich radioaktiven Stoffe in Chemie und Biologe, Umschau Volume 45, # 6, 83-87 (1941)
- H. J. Born, N. W. Timoféeff-Ressovsky and K. G. Zimmer Biologische Anwendungen des Zählrohres, Naturwissenschaften Volume 30, Number 40, 600-603 (1942). The authors were identified as being in the genetics department of the Kaiser Wilhelm Institute in Berlin-Buch.
- G. I. (H. J.) Born, N. Riehl, K. G. Zimmer Efficiency of Luminescence Production by Beta Rays in Zinc Sulfide [In Russian], Doklaky Akademii Nauk S.S.S.R. Volume 59, March 1269 – 1272 (1948)
- H. J. Born Habilitationsschrift: Radiochemie und Anwendung radioaktiver Isotope, Technische Hochschule Dresden (1956)
- G. I. (H. J.) Born, K. F. Vayss, M. G. Kobaladze On Resolution of Some Analytical Problems Pertaining to Rare Earths by Means of Radioactivation Analysis [In Russian], Trans. Comm. Anal. Khim. Akad. Nauk S.S.S.R. Volume 7, No. 10, 104-118 (1956). Translated from Referat. Zhur. Khim. No. 4, 1957, Abstract No. 12059. Institutional affiliation: Commission on Analytical Chemistry of the Academy of Sciences, USSR.
- H.-J. Born and H. Stärk Quantitative Determination of Iodine and Iodine Compounds on Chromatographic Paper. By Neutron Activation, Atomkernenergie Volume 4, 286-289 (1959). Institutional affiliation: Technical University of Munich.
- H. J. Born The Significance of Preparative Radiochemistry for the Application of Radio-Nuclides in Research and Industry, Kerntechnik Volume 3, 515-518 (1961). Institutional affiliation: Technical University of Munich.
- P. Wilkniss and H. J. Born On the Activation Analysis of Oxygen with Help of the Reaction O^{16} (T,n) F^{18}, Intern. J. Appl. Radiation and Isotopes Volume 10, 133-136 (1961). Institutional affiliation: Technical University of Munich.
- H. J. Born and H. J. Marcinowski Production and Application of Radionuclides in Europe [In German], Kerntechnik (West Germany) Merged with Atomkernenergie to form Atomkernenerg./ Kerntech.kyu Hokoku; Vol: 4, 573-579 (1962). Institutional affiliation: Isotopen-Studiengesellschaft e.V., Frankfurt am Main.
- H. J. Born The Mechanism of Molecule Formation by Nuclear Fission and Subsequent Processes in Solid Mixtures, Report Number: EUR-2209.e (1964). Institutional affiliation: Munich. Technical University of Munich.
- D. C. Aumann and H. J. Born Determination of the ^{18}O Concentration in Water by Irradiation with Neutrons [In German], Naturwissenschaften Volume 51, 159 (1964). Institutional affiliation: Technical University of Munich.
- D. C. Aumann and H. J. Born Activation Determination of Lithium Using the Reaction Chain ^{6}Li (n,alpha) ^{3}H and ^{16}O (T,n) ^{18}F' [In German], Radiochimica Acta Volume 3, 62-73 (1964). Institutional affiliation: Technical University of Munich.
- H. J. Born and D. C. Aumann Activation Analysis Determination of Lithium with the Help of the Reaction Chain ^{6}Li (n,d) ^{3}H and ^{16}O (T,n) ^{18}F, Naturwissenschaften Volume 51, 159-160 (1964). Institutional affiliation: Technical University of Munich.
- D. C. Aumann and H. J. Born Determination of Some Light Elements by Secondary Reactions, Proceedings of 1965 International Conference on Modern Trends in Activation Analysis College Station, Texas, Texas A and M University, 265-271 (1965). Institutional affiliation: Technical University of Munich.
- D. C. Aumann, H. J. Born, and R. Henkelmann Use of Fast Reactor Neutrons for Rapid and Nondestructive Trace Analysis, Especially of Oxygen [In German], Z. Anal. Chem. Volume 221, 101-108 (1966). Institutional affiliation: Technical University of Munich.
- P. Wilkniss and H. J. Born Radiochemical Separation of ^{18}F from Reactor Irradiated Gold and Uranium [In German], Int. J. Appl. Radiat. Isotop. Volume 17, 304-306 (1996). Institutional affiliation: Technical University of Munich.
- P. E. Wilkniss and H. J. Born Activation Analysis of Oxygen at the Surface of Solids, Int. J. Appl. Radiat. Isotop. Volume 18, 57-64 (1967). Institutional affiliation: Technical University of Munich.
- C. Turkowsky, H. Stärk, and H. J. Born Determination of Traces of Uranium in Rocks and Minerals by Neutron Activation [In German], Radiochim. Acta 8: 27-30 (1967). Institutional affiliation: Technical University of Munich.
- G. Höhlein, H. J. Born, and W. Weinländer Isolation of ^{242}Cm from Neutron-irradiated ^{241}Am, Radiochim. Acta 10: 85-91(1968). Institutional affiliation: Technical University of Munich.
- H. W. Johlige, D. C. Aumann, and H.-J. Born Determination of the Relative Electron Density at the Be Nucleus in Different Chemical Combinations, Measured as Changes in the Electron-Capture Half-Life of 7Be, Phys. Rev. C 2, Issue 5, 1616 - 1622 (1970). Institutional affiliation: Institut für Radiochemie at the Technical University of Munich. Received 24 November 1969; revised 22 May 1970.
- E. A. Timofeeva-Reskovskaya, Yu. I. Moskalev, and G. I. (H. J.) Born, Distribution of ^{228}Ac Following Intravenous Injection [In Russian], Trudy Inst. Ekol. Rast. Zhivotn. No. 68, 23-30 (1970)
- H. J. Born, G. Höhlein, B. Schütz, S. Specht, and W. Weinländer Facility for the Complete Processing of Actinide Targets in the Multi-Ci Range, Kerntechnik 12: 75-80 (1970). Institutional affiliation: Technical University of Munich.
- H. J. Born Activation analysis, Technical Report Number BMBW-FBK—72-13, 1st Seminar on Activation Analysis, 8 December 1970, Garching.
- A. Alian and H. J. Born Extraction of Terbium with Bis(ethyl 2-hexyl) Phosphoric Acid from Mixed Media, Radiochim. Acta Volume 17, No. 3, 168 (1972). Institutional affiliation: Technical University of Munich.
- A. Alian, H. H. Born, and H. Stärk Determination of molybdenum in standard rocks and in Scheelite Ores. Activation analysis by extraction of daughter nuclides., Radiochim. Acta; 18: No. 1, 50-57 (1972). Institutional affiliation: Technical University of Munich.
- A. Alian, H. J. Born, and H. Stärk Title Radiochemical and activation analysis by extraction of daughter nuclides. Determination of molybdenum, International Conference On modern Trends in Activation Analysis, 2 October 1972, Saclay, France.
- A. Alian, H. J. Born, and J. L. Kim Thermal and epithermal neutron activation analysis using the monostandard method, International Conference On modern Trends in Activation Analysis, 2 October 1972, Saclay, France.
- J. L. Kim, H. Lagally, and H. J. Born Ion exchange in aqueous and in aqueous—organic solvents. Part I. Anion-exchange behavior of Zr, Nb, Ta, and Pa in aqueous HCl—HF and in HCl—HF—organic solvent, Anal. Chim. Acta Volume 64, No. 1, 29-43 (1973). Institutional affiliation: Technical University of Munich.
- J. I. Kim, H. Lagally, and H. J. Born Ion exchange in aqueous and in aqueous—organic solvents. Part I. Anion-exchange behavior of Zr, Nb, Ta, and Pa in aqueous HCl—HF and in HCl—HF—organic solvent, Anal. Chim. Acta Volume 64, No. 1, 29-43 (1973)
- H. J. Born and J. L. Kim Monostandard activation analysis and its applications: analyses of kale powder and NBS standard glass samples, J. Radioanal. Chem. Volume 13, No. 2, 427-442 (1973). Institutional affiliation: Technical University of Munich.
- R. Henkelmann and H.-J. Born Analytical use of neutron-capture gamma-rays, Journal of Radioanalytical and Nuclear Chemistry Volume 16, Number 2, 473-481, (1973). Current address of Henkelmann: Institut Laue-Langevin, 38-Grenoble, France. Institutional affiliation of Born: Institut für Radiochemie of the Technical University of Munich.
- B. O. Schütz, S. Specht, and H. J. Born Title Choice of operation parameters of ion-exchange columns for separations of highly radioactive nuclides, Reactor meeting, 10 April 1973, Karlsruhe, Germany. Institutional affiliation: Technical University of Munich. (Zentralstelle für Atomkernenergie-Dokumentation, Leopoldshafen, 1973).
- R. Henkelmann and H. J. Born Analytical use of neutron-capture gamma-rays, J. Radioanal. Chem. Volume 16, No. 2, 473-481 (1973). International Conference on Modern Trends in Activation Analysis; 2 October 1972; Saclay, France. Institutional affiliation: Technical University of Munich.
- A. Alian, H. J. Born, and J. L. Kim Thermal and epithermal neutron activation analysis using the monostandard method, J. Radioanal. Chem. Volume 15, No. 2, 535-546 (1973). International Conference on Modern Trends in Activation Analysis; 2 October 1972; Saclay, France. Institutional affiliation: Technical University of Munich.
- H. Duschner, H. J. Born, and J. I. Kim Electrodeposition of protactinium as fluoride from organic solvents, Int. J. Appl. Radiat. Isotop., Volume 24, No. 8, 433-436 (1973). Institutional affiliation: Technical University of Munich.
- S. Specth, R. F. Nolte, and H. J. Born Influence of the geometry of the stationary phase on the efficiency of extraction chromatographic systems, J. Radioanal. Chem. Volume 21, No. 1, 119-127 (1974). 7th Radiochemical Conference; April 1973; Marianske Lazne, Czechoslovakia. Institutional affiliation: Technical University of Munich.
- S. Specht, B. O. Schütz, and H. J. Born Development of a high-pressure ion-exchange system for rapid preparative separations of transuranium elements, J. Radioanal. Chem., Volume 21, No. 1, pp. 167–176 (1974). 7th Radiochemical Conference; April 1973; Marianske Lazne, Czechoslovakia. Institutional affiliation: Technical University of Munich.
- V. Dronov, S. Specth, W. Weinländer, and H. J. Born Change of the efficiency of the chromatographic system in transition to higher activities. I. Comparison of alpha and gamma radiolysis of a cation exchanger with respect to its change in weight, salt separation capacity, and residual capacity and its swelling power [In German], J. Radioanal. Chem. , Volume 24, No. 2, 393-409 (1975). Institutional affiliation: Technical University of Munich.
- R. Henkelmann, K. Müller, and H. J. Born Title Determination of low-dose boron-implanted concentration profiles in silicon by the (n, alpha) reaction, Trans. Am. Nucl. Soc., Suppl., Volume 21, No. 3, 14 (1975). International Nuclear and Atomic Activation Analysis Conference and 19th Annual Meeting on Analytical Chemistry in Nuclear Technology, 14 October 1975; Gatlinburg, TN. Institutional affiliation: Technical University of Munich.
- S. Specht, V. Dornow, W. Weinländer, and H. J. Born Variation of the capacity of chromatographic systems in transitions to high activities. II. Comparison of the effect of alpha and gamma radiolysis of a cation exchanger on the distribution coefficient, separation factor, and plate heights [In German], J. Radioanal. Chem. Volume 26, No. 1, 17-30 (1975). Institutional affiliation: Technical University of Munich.
- Hans-Joachim Born, Gerd Hüttenrauch, Heinz-Joachim Link, X-ray diagnostics installation for peripheral angiography examinations, Patent number: 5349625. Filing date: March 11, 1993. Issue date: September 20, 1994. Assignee: Siemens Aktiengesellschaft.

=== Publications of the KFK and ZAED ===
- H-J. Born, S. Krawczynski, W. Ochsenfeld, and H. Scholz Kernforschungszentrum Karlsruhe. Sonderabdrucke. 116. Verwendbarkeit von Dibutyläther für die Aufbereitung bestrahlter Kernbrennstoffe mittels Extraktion (Gesellschaft für Kernforschung m.b.H., 1962). Institutional affiliations: Institut für Radiochemie of the Technischen Hochschule München and Kernreaktor Bau- und Betriebsgesellschaft mbH, Karlsruhe, Institut für Heiße Chemie.
- Hans-Joachim Born and Günter Höhlein Die Isolierung von ^{242}Cm im ^{100}Ci-Bereich aus neutronenbestrahltem ^{241}Am (Zentralstelle für Atomkernenergie-Dokumentation, ZAED, 1968)
- Hans-Joachim Born and Hans-Georg Meyer Zur Verteilung von Thorium-230, Thorium-232 und Uran-238 bei der Schwefelsäurelaugung von Uranerzen (Zentralstelle für Atomkernenergie-Dokumentation, 1968)
- Knut Lorenzen and Hans-Joachim Born Untersuchungen zur photovoltaischen Konversion (Zentralstelle für Atomkernenergie-Dokumentation, 1968)
