= Ernst Rexer =

German nuclear physicist (1902–1983)

- Born: April 2, 1902; Stuttgart, Baden-Württemberg, Germany
- Died: May 14, 1983 (aged 80); Dresden, Saxony, Germany
- Siglum: E. Rexer
- Citizenship: Germany
- Education: University of Freiburg; Humboldt University of Berlin
- Known for: Soviet program of nuclear weapons
- Scientific career
- Fields: Nuclear physics
- Workplaces: Laboratory V University of Halle-Wittenberg; Physikalisch-Technische Bundesanstalt; Dresden University of Technology; Osram Licht AG
- Thesis: Chemische Veränderungen von Stoffen durch energiereiche (1937)
- Website: E. Rexer

Ernst Rexer (2 April 1902 – 14 May 1983) was a German nuclear physicist and a professor of physics at the Dresden University of Technology.

Initially part of the German Uranverein, he was one of many German nuclear physicists at the Soviet program of nuclear weapons while in Soviet custody in Russia until his repatriation to Germany in 1956.

== Biography ==
=== Education ===
According to the German edition of Wikipedia, Rexer was born in Stuttgart, Baden-Württemberg, on 2 April 1902. After completing his high schooling in 1921, he enrolled in University of Freiburg to study physics and chemistry; he passed his chemist association's exam in 1926. From 1926 to 1929, he found an employment with the Osram Licht AG where he worked on their glass technology laboratories in Berlin and in Weißwasser.

Through his employment's sponsorship, he attended the Humboldt University of Berlin and began working on his doctoral thesis on physics of crystallization in 1929–30. At the Institute for Theoretical Physics of the University of Halle-Wittenberg, Rexer became an associate assistant and completed his habilitation on the physics of crystals in 1937. In 1937, he joined the faculty as a Dozent (lecturer) on physics at the University of Halle-Wittenberg.

== Career ==
=== Early years ===
In 1938, Rexer took a research position in the armaments industry where he investigated plastics. The German nuclear energy project, also known as the Uranverein (Uranium Club), was initiated in 1939, shortly after the discovery of nuclear fission. By September, the Heereswaffenamt (HWA, Army Ordnance Office) squeezed out the Reichsforschungsrat (RFR, Reich Research Council) of the Reichserziehungsministerium (REM, Reich Ministry of Education) and began its control over the project, under the direction of Kurt Diebner. Rexer was brought into the project. By 1942 it was apparent that the nuclear energy project would not make a decisive contribution to ending the war effort in the near term and HWA control of the project was transferred to the RFR. At that time, Rexer and his colleagues, including Heinz Pose, were transferred to the Physikalisch-Technische Reichsanstalt (PTR). Abraham Esau was President of the PTR, and he took control of the Uranverein in December, when he was appointed Plenipotentiary (Bevollmächtiger) for Nuclear Physics.

While Rexer was at the PTR, some of the research was carried out at the Versuchsstelle (testing station) of the HWA in Gottow; Kurt Diebner, was director of the facility. The testing station is where Rexer, F. Berkei, W. Borrmann, W. Czulius, Kurt Diebner, Georg Hartwig, Karl-Heinz Höcker, Walter Herrmann, and Heinz Pose, compared the effectiveness of neutron production in a paraffin-moderated reactor using uranium plates, rods, and cubes. Internal reports (See section below: Internal Reports.) on their activities were classified Top Secret and had limited distribution. The G-1 experiment performed at the HWA testing station had lattices of 6,800 uranium oxide cubes (about 25 tons) in the neutron moderator paraffin. Their work verified Höcker's calculations that cubes were better than rods, and rods were better than plates.

In 1944, Rexer was appointed professor at the Physikalischen Institut (Physics Institute) at the Universität Leipzig.

=== In Russia ===
Near the end of the World War II, the Soviet Union sent special search teams into Germany to locate and deport German nuclear scientists or any others who could be of use to the Soviet nuclear program. The Russian mission was headed by NKVD Colonel General A. P. Zavenyagin and staffed with numerous scientists, from their only nuclear laboratory, attired in NKVD officer's uniforms. In the autumn of 1945, Pose was offered the opportunity to work in the Soviet Union, which he accepted. He arrived in the Soviet Union, with his family, in February 1946. He was to establish and head Laboratory V (also known by the code name Malojaroslavets-10, after the nearby town by the same name) in Obninsk. The scientific staff at Laboratory V was to be both Russian and German, the former being mostly political prisoners from the Gulag or exiles; this type of facility is known as a Sharashka. (Laboratory B by Lake Sungul was also a sharashka and its personnel worked on the Soviet atomic bomb project. Notable Germans at Laboratory B were Hans-Joachim Born, Alexander Catsch, Nikolaus Riehl, and Karl Zimmer. Notable Russians from the Gulag were N. V. Timofeev-Resovskij and S. A. Voznesenskij.)

On 5 March 1946, in order to staff his laboratory, Pose and NKVD General Kravchenko, along with two other officers, went to Germany for six months to hire scientists. Additionally, Pose procured equipment from the companies AEG, Zeiss, Schott Jena, and Mansfeld, which were in the Russian occupation zone.

Pose planned 16 laboratories for his institute, which was to include a chemistry laboratory and eight laboratories. Three heads of laboratories, Czulius, Herrmann, and Rexer, were Pose's colleagues who worked with him at the German Army's testing station in Gottow, under the Uranverein project. (See below: Internal Reports.) Eight laboratories in the institute were:

- Heinz Pose's laboratory for nuclear processes.
- Werner Czulius's laboratory for uranium reactors.
- Walter Herrmann's laboratory for special issues of nuclear disintegration.
- Westmayer's laboratory for systematic nuclear reactions.
- Professor Carl Friedrich Weiss's laboratory for the study of natural and artificial radioactivity.
- Schmidt's laboratory to study methodologies for nuclear measurement.
- Professor Ernst Rexer's laboratory for applied nuclear physics.
- Hans Jürgen von Oertzen's laboratory to study cyclotrons and high voltage.

=== Return to Germany ===
In preparation for release from the Soviet Union, it was standard practice to put personnel into quarantine for a few years if they worked on projects related to the Soviet atomic bomb project, which Rexer did. After quarantine, he was sent to the Deutsche Demokratische Republik (DDR, German Democratic Republic) in 1956. He was appointed extraordinarius professor and Director of the Institutes für die Anwendung radioaktiver Isotope (Institute for the Application of Radioactive Isotopes) at the Technische Hochschule Dresden (today, Technische Universität Dresden). Other notable German scientists, who worked on the Soviet atomic bomb project and joined Rexer at the Technische Hochschule Dresden were Heinz Pose and two other physicists, Werner Hartmann and Heinz Barwich, who had been at Gustav Hertz's Institute G, in Agudseri (Agudzery).

== Internal Reports ==
The following reports were published in Kernphysikalische Forschungsberichte (Research Reports in Nuclear Physics), an internal publication of the German Uranverein. The reports were classified Top Secret, they had very limited distribution, and the authors were not allowed to keep copies. The reports were confiscated under the Allied Operation Alsos and sent to the United States Atomic Energy Commission for evaluation. In 1971, the reports were declassified and returned to Germany. The reports are available at the Karlsruhe Nuclear Research Center and the American Institute of Physics.

- F. Berkei, W. Borrmann, W. Czulius, Kurt Diebner, Georg Hartwig, K. H. Höcker, W. Herrmann, H. Pose, and Ernst Rexer Bericht über einen Würfelversuch mit Uranoxyd und Paraffin (dated before 26 November 1942). G-125.
- Heinz Pose and Ernst Rexer Versuche mit verschiedenen geometrischen Anordnungen von Uranoxyd und Paraffin (12 October 1943). G-240.

== Selected literature ==
- Ernst Rexer Additive Verfärbung von Alkalihalogenidkristallen II. Ultramikroskopische Diffusionsbefunde, Zeitschrift für Physik Volume 76, Numbers 11–12, 735–755, (1932). Institutional affiliation: Institut für theoretische Physik, Halle, Saale. The article was received on 12 May 1932.

== Bibliography ==
- Catalogus Professorum Halensis Ernst Rexer
- Hentschel, Klaus (editor) and Ann M. Hentschel (editorial assistant and translator) Physics and National Socialism: An Anthology of Primary Sources (Birkhäuser, 1996) ISBN 0-8176-5312-0
- Maddrell, Paul Spying on Science: Western Intelligence in Divided Germany 1945–1961 (Oxford, 2006) ISBN 0-19-926750-2
- Oleynikov, Pavel V. German Scientists in the Soviet Atomic Project, The Nonproliferation Review Volume 7, Number 2, 1 – 30 (2000). The author has been a group leader at the Institute of Technical Physics of the Russian Federal Nuclear Center in Snezhinsk (Chelyabinsk-70).
- Walker, Mark German National Socialism and the Quest for Nuclear Power 1939–1949 (Cambridge, 1993) ISBN 0-521-43804-7
