= Karl-Heinrich Riewe =

German nuclear physicist (1907–1977)

- Born: June 26, 1907; Frankfurt, Hesse, German Empire
- Died: 1970 (aged 70); Hanau, Hesse, Germany
- Siglum: K.-H. Riewe
- Citizenship: Germany
- Education: Humboldt University of Berlin
- Known for: Soviet program of nuclear weapons
- Scientific career
- Fields: Nuclear physics
- Workplaces: Auergesellschaft AG; Laboratory V German Physical Society
- Thesis: Leitfihigkeit von starken Elektrolyten bei Hochfrequenz (1936)

Karl-Heinrich Riewe (26 June 1907—1977) was a German nuclear physicist and a member of the German Physical Society.

Riewe was one of many German nuclear physicists in the former Soviet program of nuclear weapons. After the World War II, Riewe was taken in the custody by the Soviet Union, and held in Russia to work on their nuclear weapons but went onto a strike at a defense facility in 1948 where he was accused of sabotage. He was sentenced to 25 years in the GULAG and disappeared.

== Career ==
=== In Germany ===
Karl-Heinrich Riewe was born in Frankfurt, Hesse, Germany, on June 26, 1907, into a German Jewish family. In spite of being born into a Jewish faith, he was a devoted Protestant Christian, as stated in his university job application submitted for the teaching position at the Wesleyan University in Connecticut, United States in 1937. In 1928, he entered in the Technische Hochschule in Charlottenburg (now Technische Universität Berlin) to study mechanical engineering but eventually received his doctorate in physics from the Humboldt University of Berlin in 1936–37. his thesis contained fundamental research on electrical conductivity at high frequency.

He struggled to find employment in Germany and submitted an application for a teaching position in the Wesleyan University in the United States. However, he decided against moving to the United States after accepting a technical position at the Auergesellschaft.

In June 1941, Riewe co-authored a paper electron optics and plasma physics with the nuclear physicist Fritz Houtermans. At this time, Houtermans was known to have been at the Forschungslaboratoriums für Elektronenphysik (Research Laboratory for Electron Physics), a private laboratory of Manfred von Ardenne, in Berlin-Lichterfelde. The paper cites the two as being at a facility in Berlin; other papers by Riewe, three years earlier (see below), cited him as being at a facility in the community of Berlin-Wilmersdorf, which is in the vicinity of Berlin-Lichterfelde.

=== In Russia ===
Near the close of the World War II, the Soviet Union sent special search teams into Germany to locate and acquired the German nuclear scientists or any others who could be of use to the Soviet program of nuclear weapons. The Russian Alsos mission was headed by the Soviet agency, the NKVD, under Avraami Zavenyagin and staffed with numerous scientists, from their only nuclear laboratory, attired in NKVD officer's uniforms. The main search team, headed by Zavenyagin, arrived in Berlin on 3 May, the day after Russia announced the fall of Berlin to their military forces; it included Major General of Engineering Vasily Makhnyov, and Russian physicists Yulij Khariton, Isaak Kikoin, and Lev Artsimovich with targets on the top of their list were the physics facilities in Berlin and its environs.

Eventually, Riewe was taken into the Soviet custody and was sent to Russia to work on the Soviet nuclear weapons program at the Laboratory V run by Heinz Pose in Obninsk, either in the initial sweep by the special search teams or later by Pose's six-month recruitment trip, from March to August 1946, with NKVD General Kravchenko and two other officers.

In 1948, Riewe and fellow scientist, Dr. Renger, went on strike for reasons of their work conditions or hoping to be sent back to Germany after their two-year contracts expired. As their actions where while working on a defense project, they were accused of being ring-leaders of sabotage and imprisoned. Riewe received a sentence of 25 years in the Soviet Gulag and disappeared. Soviet detainee, Tamara Andryushchenko, recalled hearing that Riewe had been executed for sabotage.

== Postscript ==
Riewe's widow moved to Sukhumi, where at that time there was workforce of 300 Germans working at Manfred von Ardenne's Laboratory A, in Sinop, a suburb of Sukhumi. She eventually married the German draftsman Willi Lange and gave birth to his daughter in 1950; the family stayed till 1950 when Lange, his wife, Lange's daughter Hannelora, and his wife's children by Riewe, moved to Sungul', where he worked at Nikolaus Riehl's Laboratory V, also known under another cover name, Объект 0211 (Ob'ekt 0211, Object 0211).

After 1953, they were quarantined in the Agudzery (Agudseri) transition camp, after which Germans returned to Germany. Riewe was in the Gulag-managed city of Dzhezkazgan in Kazakhstan. After the death of Joseph Stalin, his wife and daughter Christiane (born 19/04/1942y.) had railed from Sukhumi returned to Germany.

After some time, Riewe returned to Germany despite the false rumors that he had been executed. He survived the Soviet labor camp, and was reunited with his family. The Riewe family settled in western Germany, in Hanau, Hesse, where they lived for the rest of their lives. After returning from Russia, Riewe worked for the German Physical Society in various capacity, and he died sometime in August 1970, aged 70, according to the manuscript provided by German Physics Society .

== Selected literature ==
- Über eine thermodynamische Berechnung der Ionisation, Zeitschrift für Physik, Volume 107, Issue 9-10, 680-682 (1937). The author is identified as being in Berlin-Wilmersdorf. Submitted 2 November 1937.
- Die Zustandssumme eines Dissoziationsvorganges, Zeitschrift für Physik Volume 109, Numbers 11-12, 753-757 (1938). The author is identified as being in Berlin-Wilmersdorf. Submitted 27 April 1938.
- Über eine neue thermodynamische Berechnung des Dissoziationsgrades, Zeitschrift für Physik Volume 110, Numbers 5-6, 393-394 (1938). The author is identified as being in Berlin-Wilmersdorf. Submitted 20 July 1938.
- Über die Raumladungswirkung an einem Strahl geladener Teilchen von rechteckigem Querschnitt der Blende, Archiv für Elektrotechnik Volume 35, Number 11, 686-691 (1941). The authors are identified as being in Berlin. Submitted 5 June 1941.

== Bibliography ==
- Maddrell, Paul Spying on Science: Western Intelligence in Divided Germany 1945–1961 (Oxford, 2006) ISBN 0-19-926750-2
- Naimark, Norman M. The Russians in Germany: A History of the Soviet Zone of Occupation, 1945-1949 (Hardcover - Aug 11, 1995) Belknap
- Oleynikov, Pavel V. German Scientists in the Soviet Atomic Project, The Nonproliferation Review Volume 7, Number 2, 1 – 30 (2000). The author has been a group leader at the Institute of Technical Physics of the Russian Federal Nuclear Center in Snezhinsk (Chelyabinsk-70).
