= Alexander Catsch =

German physician and biologist (1913–76)

- Born: February 13, 1913; Germany
- Died: February 16, 1976 (aged 63); Karlsruhe, Baden-Württemberg, Germany
- Other name: KATSCH
- Citizenship: Germany
- Known for: Soviet program of biological weapons
- Scientific career
- Fields: Biology
- Workplaces: Karlsruhe Institute of Technology; Laboratory B in Sungul'; Plant No. 12, Elektrostal; Kaiser Wilhelm Institute for Brain Research

Alexander Siegfried Catsch (also Katsch; 13 March [O.S. 28 February] 1913–16 February 1976) was a German biologist and a physician of Russian-descent who was one of the senior German scientists in Soviet program of nuclear weapons, and later his research was used in the Soviet program of biological weapons.

Until the end of the World War II, Catsch was a professional colleague of Soviet biologist, Nikolay Timofeev-Ressovsky at the Kaiser Wilhelm Institute for Brain Research in Berlin, studying on the genome and genetic structures. He was taken into the Soviet custody and held in Russia where he first worked at the Plant No. 12 in Ehlektrostal’, but later posted at the Laboratory B in Singul' to work on radiation biology under Timofeev-Ressovsky in 1947.

In 1955, Catsch was returned to Germany and settled in Karlsruhe where he pioneered studies in methods on extracting radionucleotides from various organs at the Karlsruhe Institute of Technology.

== Early life and education ==
Catsch was half-German and half-Russian. His mother was a sister of renowned Russian biologist Ivan Puzanov. Catsch was educated in Biology but trained as a physician.

== Career ==
=== In Germany ===
As early as 1938, Catsch cited his affiliation with the I. Medizinischen Universitätsklinik der Charité; Charité was a teaching and research hospital in Berlin. No later than 1942, he was at the Kaiser-Wilhelm-Institut für Hirnforschung (KWIH, Kaiser Wilhelm Institute for Brain Research) of the Kaiser Wilhelm Society, in Berlin-Buch. At the KWIH, he was in Nikolaj Vladimirovich Timofeev-Resovskij's Abteilung für Experimentelle Genetik (Department for Experimental Genetics), a world-renowned department with the status of an institute. There, Catsch conducted research on the effects of radiation on genetic mutations.

What happened to Catsch after the Russians entered Berlin at the close of World War II is best understood in the context of his colleagues Karl Zimmer and Hans-Joachim Born at the KWIH, who had a close professional relationship with Nikolaus Riehl, the scientific director of the Auergesellschaft, in Berlin.

At the close of World War II, Russia had special search teams operating in Austria and Germany, especially in Berlin, to identify and “requisition” equipment, materiel, intellectual property, and personnel useful to the Soviet atomic bomb project. The exploitation teams were under the Russian Alsos, and they were headed by Lavrenij Beria's deputy, Colonel General A. P. Zavenyagin. These teams were composed of scientific staff members, in NKVD officer's uniforms, from the bomb project's only laboratory, Laboratory No. 2, in Moscow. In mid-May 1945, the Russian nuclear physicists Georgy Flerov and Lev Artsimovich, in NKVD colonel's uniforms, compelled Zimmer to take them to the location of Riehl and his staff, who had evacuated their Auergesellschaft facilities and were west of Berlin, hoping to be in an area occupied by the American or British military forces. Riehl was detained at the search team's facility in Berlin-Friedrichshagen for a week. This sojourn in Berlin turned into 10 years in the Soviet Union! Riehl and his staff, including their families, were flown to Moscow on 9 July 1945. Riehl was to head up a uranium production group at Plant No. 12 in Ehlektrostal’ (Электросталь).

=== In Russia ===
From 1945 to 1950, Riehl was in charge of uranium production at Plant No. 12 in Ehlektrostal'. When Riehl learned that H. J. Born and Karl Zimmer were being held in Krasnogorsk, in the main PoW camp for Germans with scientific degrees, Riehl arranged though Zavenyagin to have them sent to Ehlektrostal’. Catsch, who had been taken prisoner with Zimmer, was also sent to the Ehlektrostal’ Plant No. 12. At Ehlektrostal’, Riehl had a hard time incorporating Born, Catsch, and Zimmer into his tasking on uranium production, as Born was a radiochemist, Catsch was a physician and radiation biologist, and Zimmer was a physicist and radiation biologist.

After the detonation of the Russian uranium bomb, uranium production was going smoothly and Riehl's oversight was no longer necessary at Plant No. 12. Riehl then went, in 1950, to head an institute in Sungul', where he stayed until 1952. Essentially the remaining personnel in his group were assigned elsewhere, with the exception of H. E. Ortmann, A. Baroni (PoW), and Herbert Schmitz (PoW), who went with Riehl. However, Riehl had already sent Born, Catsch, and Zimmer to the institute in December 1947. The institute in Sungul’ was responsible for the handling, treatment, and use of radioactive products generated in reactors, as well as radiation biology, dosimetry, and radiochemistry. The institute was known as Laboratory B, and it was overseen by the 9th Chief Directorate of the NKVD (MVD after 1946), the same organization which oversaw the Russian Alsos operation. The scientific staff of Laboratory B – a ShARAShKA – was both Soviet and German, the former being mostly political prisoners or exiles, although some of the service staff were criminals. (Laboratory V, in Obninsk, headed by Heinz Pose, was also a sharashka and working on the Soviet atomic bomb project. Other notable Germans at the facility were Werner Czulius, Hans Jürgen von Oertzen, Ernst Rexer, and Carl Friedrich Weiss.)

Laboratory B was known under another cover name as Объект 0211 (Ob’ekt 0211, Object 0211), as well as Object B. (In 1955, Laboratory B was closed. Some of its personnel were transferred elsewhere, but most of them were assimilated into a new, second nuclear weapons institute, Scientific Research Institute-1011, NII-1011, today known as the Russian Federal Nuclear Center All-Russian Scientific Research Institute of Technical Physics, RFYaTs–VNIITF. NII-1011 had the designation предприятие п/я 0215, i.e., enterprise post office box 0215 and Объект 0215; the latter designation has also been used in reference to Laboratory B after its closure and assimilation into NII-1011.)

One of the political prisoners in Laboratory B was Riehls’ colleague from the KWIH, N. V. Timofeev-Resovskij, who, as a Soviet citizen, was arrested by the Soviet forces in Berlin at the conclusion of the war, and he was sentenced to 10 years in the Gulag. In 1947, Timofeev-Resovskij was rescued out of a harsh Gulag prison camp, nursed back to health, and sent to Sungul' to complete his sentence, but still make a contribution to the Soviet atomic bomb project. At Laboratory B, Timofeev-Resovskij headed a biophysics research department, in which Born, Catsch, and Zimmer were able to conduct work similar to that which they had done in Germany, and all three became section heads in Timofeev-Resovskij's department. In fact, in Sungul', Catsch began his work on developing methods to extract radionucleotides from various organs, which he would continue when he left Russia.

In preparation for release from the Soviet Union, it was standard practice to put personnel into quarantine for a few years if they worked on projects related to the Soviet atomic bomb project, as was the case for Catsch. Additionally, in 1954, the Deutsche Demokratische Republik (DDR, German Democratic Republic) and the Soviet Union prepared a list of scientists they wished to keep in the DDR, due to their having worked on projects related to the Soviet atomic bomb project; this list was known as the “A-list”. On this A-list were the names of 18 scientists. Nine, possibly 10, of the names were associated with the Riehl group which worked at Plant No. 12 in Ehlektrostal'. Born, Catsch, Riehl, and Zimmer were on the list.

In Russia, Catsch was given a patronymic and his last name was transliterated from German into Russian; transliterated into English his name became Aleksandr Sergeevich Katsch.

=== In Germany again ===
Catsch returned to the DDR in the mid-1950s and fled West. Riehl arrived in the DDR on 4 April 1955, and by early June he was in the Federal Republic of Germany (FRG). Other colleagues of Riehl who worked with him in Russia also went West; Günter Wirths fled to the Federal Republic of Germany (FRG) and Karl Zimmer went legally.

As early as 1956, Catsch was at the Biophysikalische Abteilung des Heiligenberg-Instituts, in Heiligenberg, Baden, Germany.

No later than 1958, he was at the Institut für Strahlenbiologie of the Kernforschungszentrum Karlsruhe (KFK, Karlsruhe Nuclear Research Center), which was founded in 1956 and today is known as the Forschungszentrum Karlsruhe (FZK, Karlsruhe Research Center). It was allied with the Technische Hochschule Karlsruhe; today, it is known as the University of Karlsruhe (TH), after its reorganization and renaming in the academic year 1967/1968. In 1962, while still at the KFK, Catsch was appointed to the newly created Lehrstuhl für Strahlenbiologie at the Technische Hochschule Karlsruhe.

== Personal ==
Catsch was married to a Jewish woman.

Karl Zimmer and Catsch were lifelong friends, as well as professional colleagues.

Catsch died in Karlsruhe.

== Books ==
- A. Catsch Radioactive Metal Mobilization in Medicine (American lecture series. Publication Number 560. A monograph in American lectures in living chemistry) (C.C. Thomas, 1964)
- Alexander Catsch Die Bedeutung energiereicher Strahlungen für die Biologie (C. F. Müller, 1965)
- Alexander Catsch, Adolf Zuppinger, Lothar Diethelm, and Olle Olsson Handbuch der medizinischen Radiologie. Bd. 2. Strahlenbiologie T. 2. (Springer, 1966)
- Alexander Catsch Dekorporierung radioaktiver und stabiler Metallionen (Thiemig, 1968)
- A. Catsch The Chelation of Heavy Metals (International encyclopedia of pharmacology and therapeutics) (Pergamon Press, 1979)
  - Catsch, A., and A. E. Harmuth-Hoene Pharmacology and Therapeutic Applications of Agents Used in Heavy Metal Poisoning In Alexander Catsch The Chelation of Heavy Metals 171-183 (Pergammon Press, 1979)

=== Publications of the KFK ===
- Alexander Catsch, H. Immel-Teller, and D. Schindewolf-Jordan Kernforschungszentrum Karlsruhe. Sonderabdrucke. 51. Die Verteilung von Radiocer in den Leberzellen und ihre Beeinflussung durch die Diäthylentriaminpentaessigsäure (Gesellschaft für Kernforschung m.b.H., 1961)
- Alexander Catsch Kernforschungszentrum Karlsruhe. Sonderabdrucke. 54. Die Dekorporation von Radionukliden (Gesellschaft für Kernforschung m.b.H., 1961)
- Alexander Catsch and Glauco P. Tocchini-Valentini Kernforschungszentrum Karlsruhe. Sonderabdrucke. 71. Der Einfluss einiger Polyaminopolycarbonsäuren auf die Verteilung von Thorium-234 im Organismus der Ratte (Gesellschaft für Kernforschung m.b.H., 1961)
- Alexander Catsch Kernforschungszentrum Karlsruhe. Sonderabdrucke. 76. Radioactive Metal Mobilization (Gesellschaft f. Kernforschung m.b.H., 1961)
- Alexander Catsch Kernforschungszentrum Karlsruhe. Sonderabdrucke. 124. Der Einfluss von Chelatbildnern auf das Verhalten von Blei im Organismus (Gesellschaft für Kernforschung m.b.H., 1962)
- Alexander Catsch Kernforschungszentrum Karlsruhe. Sonderabdruck. 136. Principles and trends in therapeutic removal of internally deposited radionuclides (Gesellschaft f. Kernforschung m.b.H., 1963)
- Alexander Catsch Kernforschungszentrum Karlsruhe. Sonderabdrucke. 174. Toxicology: Radioactive metals (Gesellschaft für Kernforschung m.b.H., 1963)
- Alexander Catsch Kernforschungszentrum Karlsruhe. Sonderabdrucke. 202. Zur Toxikologie der Diäthylentriaminpentaessigsäure (Gesellschaft f. Kernforschung m.b.H., 1964)
- Alexander Catsch Kernforschungszentrum Karlsruhe. Sonderabdrucke. 237. Dekorporation von Metallionen durch Komplexbildner (Gesellschaft f. Kernforschung m.b.H., 1964) Author affiliations: Lehrstuhl für Strahlenbiologie, Technische Hochschule Karlsruhe and Institut für Strahlenbiologie am Kernforschungszentrum Karlsruhe.
- Alexander Catsch, Du Khuong Lê, and Danielle Chambault Kernforschungszentrum Karlsruhe. Sonderabdrucke. 267. Evaluation of the efficacy of different metal chelates of DTPA in removing internally-deposited radionuclides (Gesellschaft für Kernforschung m.b.H., 1964)
- Alexander Catsch and E. von Wedelstaedt Kernforschungszentrum Karlsruhe. Sonderabdrucke. 338. Vergleichende Untersuchungen über die Toxizität der Ca- und Zn[II]-Chelate der Diäthylentriaminpentaessigsäure (Gesellschaft für Kernforschung m.b.H., 1965)
- Alexander Catsch Kernforschungszentrum Karlsruhe. 390. Medikamente gegen Vergiftungen mit radioaktiven Substanzen (Gesellschaft für Kernforschung m.b.H., 1966)
- Alexander Catsch and D. Kh. Lê Kernforschungszentrum Karlsruhe. Sonderabdrucke. 407. Removal of ^{60}Co and ^{65}Zn from the mammalian body (Gesellschaft f. Kernforschung m.b.H., 1965)
- Alexander Catsch Kernforschungszentrum Karlsruhe. 491. Das Verhalten von Radiozink-Chelaten im Säugetierorganismus (Gesellschaft für Kernforschung m.b.H., 1966)
- Alexander Catsch Kernforschungszentrum Karlsruhe. 873. Probleme der Chelat-Therapie (Gesellschaft für Kernforschung m.b.H., 1968)

=== Articles ===
The majority of these literature citations have been garnered by searching on variations of the author's name on Google, Google Scholar, and the Energy Citations Database.

- Alexander Catsch Korrelationspathologische Untersuchungen 1. Die Korrelationen von Erbleiden und Anlagestörungen des Auges, Graefe's Archive for Clinical and Experimental Ophthalmology Volume 138, Number 6, 866-892 (1938). The author was identified as being at the I. Medizinischen Universitätsklinik der Charité, Berlin.
- I. Sell-Beleites and A. Catsch Mutationsauslösung durch Ultraviolettes Licht bei Drosophila I. Dosisversuche mit filtriertem Ultraviolett, Molecular and General Genetics Volume 80, Number 1, 551-557 (1942). The authors were identified as being at the Genetischen Abteilung des Kaiser Wilhelm-Instituts, Berlin-Buch, Germany. The article was received on 5 August 1942.
- A. Catsch, A. Kanellis and Gh. Radu Über den Einfluß des Alterns bestrahlter Spermien auf die Rate röntgeninduzierter Translokationen bei Drosophila melanogaster, Naturwissenschaften Volume 31, Numbers 33-34, 392 (1943)
- A. Catsch, Gh. Radu and A. Kanellis Die Dosisproportionalität der durch Röntgenbestrahlung ausgelösten Translokationen zwischen II. und III. Chromosom bei Drosophila melanogaster, Naturwissenschaften Volume 31, Numbers 31-32, 368 (1943)
- A. Catsch, A. Kanellis, Gh. Radu and P. Welt Über die Auslösung von Chromosomenmutationen bei Drosophila melanogaster mit Röntgenstrahlen verschiedener Wellenlänge, Naturwissenschaften Volume 32, Numbers 27-39, 228 (1944)
- A. Catsch, K. G. Zimmer, and O. Peter Radio-Biological Research with Fast Neutrons [In German], Zeitschrift für Naturforschung B: Anorg. Chem., Org. Chem., Biochem., Biophys. Volume 2b, 184 (1947)
- A. Catsch Eine Erbliche Störung Des Bewegungsmechanismus Bei Drosophila Melanogaster, Molecular and General Genetics Volume 82, Number 1, 64-66 (1948). The author was identified as being at the Genetischen Abteilung des Kaiser Wilhelm-Instituts, Berlin-Buch. The article was received on 1 April 1944.
- A. Catsch Die Wirkung von Calcium- und Cer-diaminozyklohexantetraessigsaurem Natrium auf die Verteilung von Radiocer im Organismus der Ratte, Naturwissenschaften Volume 43, Number 22, 520-521 (1956). The author was identified as being at the Biophysikalische Abteilung des Heiligenberg-Instituts, Heiligenberg, Baden, Germany. The article was received on 21 September 1956.
- A. Catsch Survey of the Therapeutics of Radioactive Substances [In German], Strahlentherapie Volume 99, 290-300 (1956)
- H. Langendorff and A. Katsch Investigation of Biological Protective Agents. Part Xvi. On the Protective Effects of Cysteamine on Acute Radiation Mortality of Mice [In German], Strahlentherapie Volume 101, 536-541 (1956)
- H. Langendorff, A. Katsch, and R. Koch Investigation on a Biological Protective Screen. XVII. The Effect on Radiation Protection of Cysteamine Administered after Partial Body Irradiation [In German], Strahlentherapie Volume 102, 51-57 (1957)
- H. Langendorff, A. Katsch, and R. Koch Investigation of a Biological Protective Screen. Part XIX. Further Research on Sensitivity to Radiation and Cysteamine Protection of Male Mice after Gonadectomy [In German], Strahlentherapie Volume 102, 291-297 (1957)
- H. Langendorff, R. Koch, A. Catch, and U. Hagen The Influence on Survival Rate of X-irradiated Rats and Mice of Liver and Spleen Autolysates, Spleen Homogenates, and Spleen Implantation [In German], Strahlentherapie Volume 102, 298-304 (1957)
- A Catsch The Influence of Isotopic and Nonisotopic Carriers on the Behavior of Sr^{90} in the Rat [In German], Experientia (Switzerland), Volume 13, 312-313 (1957)
- A. Catsch and D. K. Le Investigation of the Therapeutic Possibilities in Radioactive Contamination. I. the Effect of Chelating Agents on the Behavior of Radiocerium in the Mammal Organism [In German], Strahlentherapie Volume 104, 494-506 (1957). Institutional affiliation: Heiligenberg-Instituts, Baden, Germany.
- A. Catsch Maximum Permissible Concentration of Radioisotopes [In German], Atomkern Energie Volume 2, 181-186 (1957)
- A. Catsch and D. K. Le Removal of Internally Deposited Radiocerium by the Use of Chelating Agents, Nature Volume 180, 609 (1957). Institutional affiliation: Biophysikalische Abteilung des Heiligenberg-Instituts, Baden, Germany.
- A. Catsch A Simple Analytical Method for the Determination of the Ratio of the Mother and Daughter Substances in Radioactive Preparations [In German], Experientia (Switzerland) Volume 14, 345-346 (1958). Institutional affiliation: Institut für Strahlenbiologie an der Reaktor-Station, Karlsruhe, Germany.
- A. Catsch and H. Melchinger Investigations on the Therapeutic Possibilities in Poisoning with Radioactive Fission Products. 2. The Effect of Diamindodiethylether Tetraacetic Acid and Diethylenetriamine Pentaacetic Acid on the Distribution of Radiocerium, Strahlentherapie Volume 106, 606-626 (1958). Institutional affiliation: Heiligenberg-Instituts, Germany.
- A. Catsch and D. K. Le Investigations on the Therapeutic Possibilities in Poisoning with Radioactive Fission Products. III. The Effect on the Excretion of Radiocerium of Delayed Single Injections of Diethylenetriamine Pentaacetic Acid [In German], Strahlentherapie Volume 107, 298-308 (1958). Institutional affiliation: Heiligenberg-Instituts, Heiligenberg, Germany.
- A. Catsch and H. Melchinger Investigation on the Therapeutic Possibilities in Poisoning with Radioactive Fission Products. IV. The Effect of Chelates on the Biological Distribution of Radioyttrium, Strahlentherapie Volume 107, 437-443 (1958). Institutional affiliation: Heiligenberg-Instituts, Heiligenberg, Germany.
- A. Catsch and H. Melchinger Investigations on the Therapeutic Possibilities in Poisoning with Radioactive Fission Products. 5. The Effect of Chelate Formation on the Biological Behavior of Radiostrontium [In German], Strahlentherapie Volume 108, 63-72 (1959). Institutional affiliation: Heiligenberg-Instituts, Heiligenberg/Baden, Germany.
- H. J. Heller and A. Catsch Some Physical Chemical Considerations on the Elimination of Radioactive metals by Chelating Agents [In German], Strahlentherapie Volume 109, 464-482 (1959). Institutional affiliation: Reaktorstation, Karlsruhe, Germany.
- A Catsch and H. Melchinger Investigations on therapeutic Possibilities in Poisoning with Radioactive Fission Products. VI. Affecting of the Behavior of Radiostrontium by Earth Alkaline Salts, [In German] Strahlentherapie Volume 109, 561-572 (1959). Institutional affiliation: Heiligenberg-Instituts, Heiligenberg/Baden, Germany.
- A. Catsch, H. Immel-Teller, and D. Schindewolf-Jordan Die Verteilung von Radiocer in den Leberzellen und ihre Beeinflussung durch die Diäthylentriaminpentaessigsäure [The Distribution of Radiocerium in Liver Cells and its Modification by Diethylene (Traiamine)-Pentaacetic Acid], Zeitschrift für Naturforschung, B: Anorg. Chem., Org. Chem., Biochem., Biophys. Volumer 16 b, Number 3, 181-185 (1961). The authors were identified as being at the Institut für Strahlenbiologie am Kernforschungszentrum Karlsruhe. The article was received on 17 November 1960.
- A. Catsch and H. Kiefer Modification of the Resorption of Radiocerium from an Intramuscular Injection by Diethylenetriaminepentaacetic Acid [In German] Experienta Volume 17, 22-23 (1961). Institutional affiliation: Kernforschungszentrum, Karlsruhe, Germany.
- A. Catsch The Decorporation of Radionuclides [In German], Kerntechnik Volume 3, 97-102 (1961). Institutional affiliation: Institut für Strahlenbiologie am Kernforschungszentrum, Karlsruhe, Germany.
- A. Catsch Retention in the Skeleton of Radiostrontium as influenced by Tetracycline, Nature Volume 197, 302 (1963) Institutional affiliation: Institut für Strahlenbiologie, Kernforschungszentrum, Karlsruhe.
- D. Seidel, A. Catsch, and K. Schweer Decorporation of Radionuclides (Investigation of Radioruthenium) [In German] Strahlentherapie Volume 122, 595-610 (1963). Institutional affiliation: Kernforschungszentrum, Karlsruhe, Germany.
- A Catsch Toxicology: Radioactive Metals, Annu. Rev. Pharmacol. Volume 3, 243-266 (1963). Institutional affiliation: Kernforschungszentrum, Karlsruhe, Germany.
- Alexander Catsch, Du Khuong Lê, Danielle Chambault Evaluation of the Efficacy of Different Metal Chelates of DTPA in Removing Internally-deposited Radionuclides, International Journal of Radiation Biology Volume 8, Issue 1, 35-43 (1964). All of the authors were identified as being at the Institut für Strahlenbiologie, Kernforschungszentrum Karlsruhe, Germany.
- Alexander Catsch Zur Toxikologie der Diäthylentriaminpentaessigsäure, Naunyn-Schmiedeberg's Archives of Pharmacology Volume 246, Number 4, 316-329 (1964). The author was identified as being at the Institut für Strahlenbiologie, Kernforschungszentrum Karlsruhe, Germany. The article was received on 20 July 1963.
- Anna-Elisabeth Harmuth-Hoene; Alexander Catsch; Vladimir Nigrovi; Felicitas Bohne Excretion of ^{65}Zn-DTPA in the Rat, International Journal of Radiation Biology, Volume 10, Issue 5, 479-483 (1966)
- A. Catsch Removal of Radiostrontium from the Mammalian Body in J. M. A. Lenihan, J. F. Loutit, and J. H. Martin (editors) Strontium Metabolism 265-281 (Academic Press, 1967). From the International Symposium on Some Aspects of Strontium Metabolism, Chapelcross, Scotland, May 5–7, 1966. Institutional affiliations: Technische Hochschule, Karlsruhe, Germany; Institut für Strahlenbiologie, Karlsruhe, Germany.
- A. Seidel, V. Volf, A. Catsch Effectiveness of Zn-DTPA in Removal of Plutonium from Rats, Int. J. Radiation Biol. Volume 19, Number 4, 399-400 (1971). Institutional affiliation: Institut für Strahlenbiologie, Karlsruhe, Germany.
- A. Catsch 60th anniversary of K.G. Zimmer [In German], Strahlentherapie Volume 142, Number 1, 124-5 (1971)
- A. Catsch Treatment of radiation damage [In German], Z. Versicherungswiss. Number 1, 125-131 (1975). Annual meeting of the Deutscher Verein für Versicherungswissenschaft e.V. 5 March 1975, Karlsruhe, Germany . Institutional affiliation: Kernforschungszentrum Karlsruhe, Institut für Strahlenbiologie.
- A. Catsch, A., and A. E. Harmuth-Hoene New Developments in Metal Antidotal Properties of Chelating Agents, Biochemical Pharmacology Volume 24, 1557-1562 (1975)
- A. Catsch Removal of Transuranic Elements by Chelating Agents, in Diagnosis and Treatment of Incorporated Radionuclides: Proceedings of an International Seminar, Vienna, December 8 through 12, 1975, (Vienna: International Atomic Energy Agency, 1976), IAEI-SR-6/103, 295-305, 1976.
