= Heinz Pose =

German nuclear physicist (1905–1975)

- Born: Heinz Ferdinand Hermann Pose; April 10, 1905; Königsberg, Prussia, German Empire (Kaliningrad, Kaliningrad Oblast, Russia)
- Died: 13 November 1975 (aged 70); Dresden, Saxony, Germany
- Citizenship: Germany
- Education: University of Königsberg; Ludwig-Maximilians-Universität München; University of Göttingen; University of Halle-Wittenberg
- Known for: Soviet program of nuclear weapons Uranverein
- Awards: War Merit Cross (1943)
- Scientific career
- Fields: Nuclear physics
- Workplaces: Technical University Dresden; Laboratory for Nuclear Problems; Laboratory B Physical Technical Institute; University of Leipzig; Kaiser Wilhelm Society
- Thesis: Experimentelle Untersuchungen über die Diffusion langsamer Elektronen in Edelgasen (1928)
- Doctoral advisor: Gustav Hertz

Heinz Ferdinand Hermann Pose (10 April 1905 – 13 November 1975), best known as Heinz Pose, was a German nuclear physicist and a professor of physics at the Technical University Dresden (TU Dresden).

An early member of the Germany's Uranium Club where he undertook the understanding on the physics of nuclear reactor. After the World War II, Pose accepted an invitation to direct the Laboratory B in Russia and was one of many German nuclear physicists in the Soviet program of nuclear weapons in 1945.

From 1957 until 1959, he worked in Joint Institute for Nuclear Research in Dubna before settling for a professorship in physics in Germany in 1959, eventually heading the faculty at the Technische Hochschule Dresden.

== Background ==
=== Roots and education ===
Pose was born in Königsberg in Prussia, German Empire, which is now known as Kaliningrad in Kaliningrad Oblast, Russia, on 10 April 1905 . His family roots came from eastern Prussia; he was very familiar with Russian culture, customs and norms, and its language. His full name is noted as Heinz Ferdinand Hermann Pose, provided by the Klaus Hentschel in his anthology text in 2011.

The Russian Wikipedia sources noted his name as Rudolf Heinz Pose, and also mentioned in text written by Roger Stuewer in 2018. Nonetheless, he was known as Heinz Pose. Pose attended the University of Königsberg where he studied physics; after graduation, Pose attended the graduate schools in physics at the Ludwig-Maximilians-Universität München, and at the University of Göttingen. In 1925, he joined the physics group under Gustav Hertz at the University of Halle-Wittenberg and defended his doctoral thesis (Dr. habil.) in physics, which contained fundamentals on the gaseous diffusion methods on the noble gases, in 1928.

== Career ==
=== Early years ===
From 1928 Pose was an unsalaried assistant and from 1930 a regular assistant to the physicist Gerhard Hoffmann, who was doing research in nuclear reaction measurements. In 1929, Pose studied the nuclear reactions of aluminum nuclei bombarded with alpha particles. His experiments showed the existence of discrete energy levels in the nucleus. His pioneering work described for the first time the effect of resonance transformation in a nuclear process. On the basis of these works and his Habilitation, Pose was awarded a teaching contract for atomic physics in 1934. He continued to study these nuclear reactions in other light (low atomic number) nuclei through the 1930s. In 1939, he was awarded an unscheduled/adjunct (außerplanmäßige) professorship at Halle.

During World War II, Pose was delegated to various organizations to carry on nuclear research and development activities. From 1940, he worked for the Kaiser-Wilhelm Gesellschaft's Institut für Physik (KWIP, Kaiser Wilhelm Institute for Physics) on the German nuclear energy project Uranverein. He worked with Werner Maurer on proof of spontaneous neutron emission of uranium and thorium. From 1942, he was at the Physikalisch-Technische Reichsanstalt, where Abraham Esau was president, and also held the title of Plenipotentiary (Bevollmächtiger) for Nuclear Physics - as such, he controlled German nuclear research. Some of the research was carried out at the Versuchsstelle (testing station) of the Heereswaffenamt (HWA, Army Ordnance Office) in Gottow; Kurt Diebner, was director of the facility. The testing station is where Pose and Ernst Rexer compared the effectiveness of neutron production in a paraffin-moderated reactor using uranium plates, rods, and cubes. Internal reports (See section below: Internal Reports.) on their activities were classified Top Secret and had limited distribution. The G-1 experiment performed at the HWA testing station had lattices of 6,800 uranium oxide cubes (about 25 tons) in the neutron moderator paraffin. Their work verified Karl Heinz Höcker's calculations that cubes were better than rods, and rods were better than plates. In June 1944, he went to the Physics Institute of the University of Leipzig to work on cyclotron development.

=== In Russia ===
Near the close of World War II, the Soviet Union sent special search teams into Germany to locate and deport German nuclear scientists or any others who could be of use to the Soviet atomic bomb project. The Russian Alsos teams were headed by NKVD Colonel General A. P. Zavenyagin and staffed with numerous scientists, from their only nuclear laboratory, attired in NKVD officer's uniforms. In the autumn of 1945, Pose was offered the opportunity to work in the Soviet Union, which he accepted. He arrived in the Soviet Union, with his family, in February 1946. He was to establish and head Laboratory V (also known by the code name Malojaroslavets-10, after the nearby town by the same name) in Obninsk. The scientific staff at Laboratory V was to be both Russian and German, the former being mostly political prisoners from the Gulag or exiles; this type of facility is known as a sharashka. (Laboratory B in Sungul' was also a sharashka and its personnel worked on the Soviet atomic bomb project. Notable Germans at Laboratory B were Hans-Joachim Born, Alexander Catsch, Nikolaus Riehl, and Karl Zimmer. Notable Russians from the Gulag were N. V. Timofeev-Resovskij and S. A. Voznesenskij.)

On 5 March 1946, in order to staff his laboratory, Pose and NKVD General Kravchenko, along with two other officers, went to Germany for six months to hire scientists. Additionally, Pose procured equipment from the companies AEG, Zeiss, Schott Jena, and Mansfeld, which were in the Soviet occupation zone.

Pose planned 16 laboratories for his institute, which was to include a chemistry laboratory and eight laboratories. Three heads of laboratories, Czulius, Herrmann, and Rexer, were Pose's colleagues who worked with him at the German Army's testing station in Gottow, under the Uranverein project. (See below: Internal Reports.) Eight laboratories in the institute were:

- Heinz Pose's laboratory for nuclear processes
- Werner Czulius's laboratory for uranium reactors
- Walter Herrmann's laboratory for special issues of nuclear disintegration
- Westmayer's laboratory for systematic nuclear reactions
- Professor Carl Friedrich Weiss's laboratory for the study of natural and artificial radioactivity
- Schmidt's laboratory to study methodologies for nuclear measurement
- Professor Ernst Rexer's laboratory for applied nuclear physics
- Hans Jürgen von Oertzen's laboratory to study cyclotrons and high voltage

Although many eminent German scientists went willingly to the Soviet Union, including Manfred von Ardenne, Heinz Barwich, Gustav Hertz, Nikolaus Riehl, Peter Adolf Thiessen, and Max Volmer, the Russians were not above intimidation and heavy-handed techniques. It must have been highly intimidating to be invited to work in the Soviet Union by a uniformed (NKVD) officer of a conquering military force, especially in the wake of the devastation and brutality of the Battle of Berlin, one of the bloodiest conflicts in the closing months of the war and history itself. On the other end of the spectrum, the heavy-handed techniques were clearly demonstrated on a large scale, such as in Operation Osoaviakhim in late 1946. Since Pose was on the staff of the German nuclear energy project Uranverein, he had intimate knowledge of scientists who would be useful as staff and laboratory heads in his facility in Obninsk. This included personnel such as Rexer, Herrmann, and Czulius, who worked with Pose at the German Army's testing station in Gottow, under the Uranverein project, and had co-authored a classified nuclear energy report (see below) with him. Czulius, long after the war, remembered how an armed guard invited him to meet with an important Russian general in Berlin. When he got to Berlin, Czulius was told that the general was in Moscow, and he was sent there. When he got to Moscow, Czulius was informed that the general was busy, so he should get to work immediately, which he did.

While in Germany on his recruiting trip, Pose wrote a letter to the Physics Nobel Laureate Werner Heisenberg inviting him to work in Russia. The letter lauded the working conditions in Russian and the available resources, as well as the favorable attitude of the Russians towards German scientists. A courier hand delivered the recruitment letter to Heisenberg; Heisenberg politely declined in a return letter to Pose.

In 1947, Alexander Leipunski, scientific liaison of the Ninth Chief Directorate of the NKVD since 1946, was assigned to Laboratory V. He eventually became the scientific director of the Institute of Power and Power Engineering, which was founded on the basis of Laboratory V. The Reactor Section of the Scientific Council of the First Chief Directorate of the NKVD, in May, assigned Leipunski and Laboratory V the tasking to develop nuclear reactors with beryllium as a neutron moderator. Later, Laboratory V was charged with the development of a gas-cooled reactor using enriched uranium and beryllium as a moderator. Laboratory V was also assigned tasking for the studies of radiation biology and separation of radio isotopes, similar to the tasking given Nikolaus Riehl's Laboratory B in Sungul'.

Other personnel in Pose's Laboratory V were Wolfgang Burkhardt, Dr. Baroni, Dr. Ernst Busse, Dr. Hans Keppel, Dr. Willi Haupt, Dr. Karl-Heinrich Riewe, Dr. Eng. Herbert Thieme (formerly with Nikolaus Riehl at Plant No. 12 in Ehlektrostal'), Dr. Hans Gerhard Krüger (formerly with Gustav Hertz at Institute G), Dr. Helene Külz, Dr. Hellmut Scheffers, and Dr. Renger.

In 1952, most of the German scientists left Laboratory V for a facility in Sukhumi, where they remained in quarantine until returning to Germany in 1955. However, Pose remained at Laboratory V until 1955, when he then went to the Laboratory for Nuclear Problems, now the Joint Institute for Nuclear Research, in Dubna.

In 1957, while still at the Joint Institute for Nuclear Research, Pose became a professor for special areas of nuclear physics at Technische Hochschule Dresden.

=== In East Germany ===
In 1959 Pose returned to Germany and settled in Dresden, East Germany. In addition to continuing his teaching at the Technische Hochschule, he became the first director of the Instituts für Allgemeine Kerntechnik (Institute for General Nuclear Technology), whose chair for Neutron Physics of Reactors he also took over. At the same time, he became Dean of the Faculty for Nuclear Technology, which was created in 1955.

After closing the Faculty for Nuclear Technology in 1962, Pose transferred to the directorship of the Institut für experimentelle Kernphysik (Institute for Experimental Nuclear Physics) and the teaching chair of the same name at the Technische Hochschule. He held these positions until 1970.

== Declined defection ==
At the close of World War II, Pose's brother, Werner, was a prisoner of war of the Russians. Pose arranged for Werner to be transferred to Obninsk and he employed Werner as a technician in Laboratory V.

When released from the Soviet Union in 1953, Werner, returned to Germany. Since his family lived in West Germany, he was sent there. Werner passed through the Friedland Camp upon entering West Germany. There, the Scientific and Technical Intelligence Branch (STIB) of the Control Commission for Germany - British Element (CCG/BE), recognized his potential and took an interest in him. So did the "Org", the Gehlen Organization, which would later become the Bundesnachrichtendienst (BND, West German Federal Intelligence Service). Werner was eventually used by the CIA to try to induce Pose to defect to the United States in 1958. Pose rebuffed the attempt.

The Org and STIB had an interest in a chemist in Obninsk who Werner knew. When the chemist was allowed to go to Germany in 1955, Werner introduced the chemist to representatives from the Org and STIB. Unfortunately for Werner, the chemist had been recruited by the Ministerium für Staatssicherheit (MfS, Ministry for State Security) of East Germany. This eventually resulted in Werner being arrested by the MfS when he tried to cross over into East Germany. Werner was tried in April 1959 and sentenced to six years in prison.

== Honors ==
- 1943 – Kriegsverdienstkreuz, 2. Klasse

== Internal reports ==
The following reports were published in Kernphysikalische Forschungsberichte (Research Reports in Nuclear Physics), an internal publication of the German Uranverein. The reports were classified Top Secret, they had very limited distribution, and the authors were not allowed to keep copies. The reports were confiscated under the Allied Operation Alsos and sent to the United States Atomic Energy Commission for evaluation. In 1971, the reports were declassified and returned to Germany. The reports are available at the Karlsruhe Nuclear Research Center and the American Institute of Physics.

- F. Berkei, W. Borrmann, W. Czulius, Kurt Diebner, Georg Hartwig, K. H. Höcker, W. Herrmann, H. Pose, and Ernst Rexer Bericht über einen Würfelversuch mit Uranoxyd und Paraffin (dated before 26 November 1942). G-125.
- Heinz Pose and Ernst Rexer Versuche mit verschiedenen geometrischen Anordnungen von Uranoxyd und Paraffin (12 October 1943). G-240.

== Selected literature ==
- Heinz Pose Experimentelle Untersuchungen über die Diffusion langsamer Elektronen in Edelgasen Zeitschrift für Physik, Volume 52, Issue 5–6, 428-447 (1929)
- Heinz Pose Messung einzelner Korpuskularstrahlen bei Anwesenheit intensiver Gamma - Strahlen, Zschr. Physik Volume 102, Numbers 5 & 6, 379-407 (1936)
- Rudolph H. Pose Vospominanija ob Obninske (Reminiscences of Obninsk) in History of the Soviet Atomic Project - 1996, Proceedings 2 (IzdAt, 1999)

== Books ==
- Heinz Pose Einführung in die Physik des Atomkerns (Deutscher Verlag der Wissenschaften, 1971)

== Bibliography ==
- Catalogus Professorum Halensis Heinz Pose
- Hentschel, Klaus (editor) and Ann M. Hentschel (editorial assistant and translator) Physics and National Socialism: An Anthology of Primary Sources (Birkhäuser, 1996) ISBN 0-8176-5312-0
- Maddrell, Paul Spying on Science: Western Intelligence in Divided Germany 1945–1961 (Oxford, 2006) ISBN 0-19-926750-2
- Oleynikov, Pavel V. German Scientists in the Soviet Atomic Project, The Nonproliferation Review Volume 7, Number 2, 1 – 30 (2000). The author has been a group leader at the Institute of Technical Physics of the Russian Federal Nuclear Center in Snezhinsk (Chelyabinsk-70).
- Seeliger, Dieter Der Schöpfer des Labors »W« hätte Jubiläum, Dresdner Universitäts Journal 5 April 2005, p. 12. Pose – Technical University Dresden, Honoring Pose's 100th Birthday
- Walker, Mark German National Socialism and the Quest for Nuclear Power 1939–1949 (Cambridge, 1993) ISBN 0-521-43804-7

== See also ==
- Russian Alsos
