= Paul Maddrell =

British historian

Dr. Paul Maddrell is a British Historian and lecturer in History at Loughborough University in the Politics, History and International Relations department. He is an internationally known expert on spying in post-war Germany as well as on the participation of German nuclear physicists in the Soviet atomic bomb project.

== Studies and research ==
He has studied at The University of Cambridge and obtained an MA, LL. M., M. Phil, and Ph. D Degrees in History. Prior to teaching at Aberystwyth he lectured at the University of Salford.

Paul Maddrell's research interests center around security, intelligence, and Post-War Germany. He has written several academic articles and chapters of books on these topics. In 2006 he had a book published by Oxford University Press entitled Spying on Science: Western Intelligence in Divided Germany, 1945-1961 about technical espionage between the superpowers in the Cold War, particularly concentrating on the West's intelligence collection in the GDR.

He often is invited to media interviews and conferences on intelligence, especially about the former East German State Security. So he was recently interviewed in a BBC Radio 4 bulletin of 5 November 2012 on Soviet nuclear weapons in the GDR during the Second Berlin Crisis. He also took part as lecturer at the International Conference “Need to Know II: ‘Lessons learned’” organized by the Southern Denmark University in Odense, 16–17 October 2012

== Selected publications ==
=== Books ===
- Spying on Science: Western Intelligence in Divided Germany, 1945-1961 (Oxford : Oxford University Press, 2006)

=== Edited books ===
- The Image of the Enemy: Intelligence Analysis of Adversaries since 1945 (Washington DC: Georgetown University Press, 2015)

=== Chapters in books ===
- "Operation 'Matchbox' and the Scientific Containment of the USSR," in P. Jackson & J. Siegel (eds.), Intelligence and Statecraft: The Use and Limits of Intelligence in International Society ( Westport, CT : Praeger Publishers), (2005), pp. 173–206.
- "Blütezeit der Spionage," in Stiftung Haus der Geschichte der Bundesrepublik Deutschland & Zeitgeschichtliches Forum Leipzig (Hrsg.), Duell im Dunkel: Spionage im geteilten Deutschland (Köln: Böhlau Verlag), (2002), pp. 25–33.
- "La Pénétration de la Zone Soviétique de l'Allemagne et de l'Union Soviétique par les Services de Renseignement Britanniques, 1945-1955," in J. Delmas & J. Kessler (eds.), Renseignement et Propaganda pendant la Guerre Froide (1947-1953) (Brussels: Editions Complexe), (1999), pp. 153–172.

=== Academic articles ===
- “The Western Secret Services, the East German Ministry of State Security and the Building of the Berlin Wall,” Intelligence and National Security, Vol. 21, No. 5 (2006), pp. 829–847
- “The Scientist Who Came in from the Cold: Heinz Barwich's Flight from the GDR,” Intelligence and National Security, Vol. 20, No. 4 (2005), pp. 608–630.
- "What we have Discovered about the Cold War is what we already Knew: Julius Mader and the Western Secret Services during the Cold War," Cold War History, Vol. 5, No. 2 (2005), pp. 235–258.
- "Debate: The Stasi Files," Intelligence and National Security, Vol. 19, No. 3 (2004), pp. 553–569.
- "The Revolution Made Law: The Work since 2001 of the Federal Commissioner for Records of the State Security Service of the former German Democratic Republic," Cold War History, Vol. 4, No. 3 (2004), pp. 153–162.
- "Einfallstor in die Sowjetunion: die Besatzung Deutschlands und die Ausspähung der UdSSR durch den britischen Nachrichtendienst," Vierteljahrshefte für Zeitgeschichte, Vol. 51, No. 2 (2003), pp. 183–227.
- "Western Intelligence Gathering and the Division of German Science," Cold War International History Project Bulletin, Issue 12/13 (Fall/Winter 2001), pp. 352–359.
- "British-American Scientific Intelligence Collaboration during the Occupation of Germany," Intelligence and National Security, Vol. 15, No. 2 (2000), pp. 74–94. This special issue of Intelligence and National Security was also published as a book, R. Jeffreys- Jones & D. Stafford (eds.), American-British-Canadian Intelligence Relations, 1939-2000 (London: Cass).
- "Battlefield Germany," Intelligence and National Security, Vol. 13, No. 2 (1998), pp. 190–212.
- "Fond 89 of the Archives of the Soviet Communist Party and Soviet State," Intelligence and National Security, Vol. 12, No. 2 (1997), pp. 184–197.
