= Günter Wirths =

German chemist (1911–2005)

- Born: June 1, 1911; Berlin, Germany
- Died: January 26, 2005 (aged 93); Essen, North Rhine-Westphalia, Germany
- Citizenship: Germany
- Education: Humboldt University of Berlin
- Known for: Soviet program of nuclear weapons
- Awards: Stalin Prize (1950); Order of the Red Flag (1950)
- Scientific career
- Fields: Nuclear chemistry
- Workplaces: Auergesellschaft AG; Plant No. 12 in Elektrostal; Degussa AG
- Thesis: Komplexe in einigen salzschmelzen (1936)
- Doctoral advisor: Walter Noddack

Günter Wirths (1 June 1911 – 26 January 2005) was a German nuclear chemist in the former Soviet program of nuclear weapons and an authority on the uranium metal production, especially on the reactor-grade.

Until the fall of Berlin in 1945, Wirths was employed with the Auergesellschaft AG in the production of uranium for the Heereswaffenamt as part of their Uranverein club.

After taken into the Soviet custody, he became one of many German nuclear physicists who were involved in the former Soviet program of nuclear weapons in Russia and returned to Germany in 1955 where he later worked at the Degussa AG chemical company.

== Career ==
=== Early years ===
Günter Wirths was born in Berlin on 1 June 1911– he received doctorate in chemistry from University of Freiburg. His thesis contained the fundamental research work on the complexity on the molten salts which was done under the supervision of Walter Noddack.

Wirths was a colleague of Nikolaus Riehl, who was the director of the scientific headquarters of Auergesellschaft. Auergesellschaft had a substantial amount of "waste" uranium from which it had extracted radium. After reading a paper in 1939 by Siegfried Flügge, on the technical use of nuclear energy from uranium, Riehl recognized a business opportunity for the company, and, in July of that year, went to the Heereswaffenamt (HWA, Army Ordnance Office) to discuss the production of uranium. The HWA was interested and Riehl committed corporate resources to the task. The HWA eventually provided an order for the production of uranium oxide, which took place in the Auergesellschaft plant in Oranienburg, north of Berlin.

It was this that got Wirths involved with the production of uranium metal, which Auergesellschaft did for the Uranverein project of the Heereswaffenamt.

=== In Russia ===
Near the close of World War II, as American, British, and Russian military forces were closing in on Berlin, Riehl and some of his staff moved to a village west of Berlin, to try to ensure occupation by British or American forces. However, in mid-May 1945, with the assistance of Riehl's colleague Karl Günter Zimmer, the Russian nuclear physicists Georgy Flerov and Lev Artsimovich showed up one day in NKVD colonel's uniforms. The use of Russian nuclear physicists in the wake of Soviet troop advances to identify and "requisition" equipment, material, intellectual property, and personnel useful to the Russian atomic bomb project is similar to the American Operation Alsos. The military head of Alsos was Lt. Col. Boris Pash, former head of security on the American atomic bomb effort, the Manhattan Project, and its chief scientist was the eminent physicist Samuel Goudsmit. In early 1945, the Soviets initiated an effort similar to Alsos (Russian Alsos). Forty out of less than 100 Russian scientists from the Soviet atomic bomb project's Laboratory 2 went to Germany, Austria, and Czechoslovakia in support of acquisitions for the project.

The two colonels requested that Riehl join them in Berlin for a few days, where he also met with nuclear physicist Yulii Borisovich Khariton, also in the uniform of an NKVD colonel. This sojourn in Berlin turned into 10 years in the Soviet Union. Riehl and his staff, including their families, were flown to Moscow on 9 July 1945. Wirths either flew out with Riehl or was later sent to join Riehl in Russia as a member of his group. Eventually, Riehl's entire laboratory was dismantled and transported to the Soviet Union.

From 1945 to 1950, Riehl was in charge of uranium production at Plant No. 12 in Ehlektrostal' (Электросталь). German scientists, who were mostly atomic scientists, sent by the Soviets, at the close of World War II, to work in the Riehl group at Plant No. 12 included Alexander Catsch (Katsch), H. J. Born, Ortmann, Przybilla, Herbert Schmitz, Sommerfeldt, Herbert Thieme, Tobein, Günter Wirths, and Karl Günter Zimmer.

Three major technological upgrades were made at Plant No. 12 in the production metallic uranium, two of them involved Wirths as a principle driving force:

- Late in 1945, the United States released the book Atomic Energy for Military Purposes by Henry Smyth (the Smyth Report). The book was acquired by the Soviets, immediately translated, and distributed to the organizations involved in the Russian atomic bomb project. The translators noticed that the original printing contained a reference to Neutron poisoning in production reactors which was censored from subsequent versions. Riehl read the report in one night. From statements in the book, Wirths and Herbert Thieme worked out the ether process, the wet-chemistry extraction process of uranium production, which replaced the low-throughput fractional crystallization method. The ceramic components were obtained from the Hermsdorf ceramic factory in Thuringia, Germany. A small industrial plant was in operation by February 1946. Its success resulted in a much larger plant being built in 1947, which had a much larger production capacity. It was in operation by the end of 1947.
- Riehl was approached by a scientist from the Nauchno-Issledovatel'skij Institut-9 (NII-9, Scientific Research Institute No. 9). Riehl refers to this man as the Platinum Colonel. The Platinum Colonel expressed the opinion that uranium tetrafluoride could be used in metallic uranium production instead of uranium oxide. Riehl believed this information was derived through Russian espionage, while others more recently credit it to the State Institute for Rare Metals (Giredmet). In any event, Wirths and the chief engineer at Plant No. 12, Yuri N. Golovanov, worked out the technological applications of the uranium tetrafluoride process in the production of uranium, which was superior to the uranium oxide process. The first experiments with the tetrafluoride were conducted in 1946, and the technology was accepted for industrial application in 1947.
- A high-frequency vacuum oven was acquired for the melting and casting of uranium.

For their work at Plant No. 12, in contribution to the Soviet atomic bomb project, Wirths and Thieme were awarded a Stalin Prize, second class, and the Order of the Red Banner of Soviet Labor, also known and the Order of the Red Flag.

In preparation for release from the Soviet Union, it was standard practice to put personnel into quarantine for a few years if they worked on projects related to the Soviet atomic bomb project, as was the case for Wirths. Additionally, in 1954, the Deutsche Demokratische Republik (DDR, German Democratic Republic) and the Soviet Union prepared a list of scientists they wished to keep in the DDR, due to their having worked on projects related to the Soviet atomic bomb project; this list was known as the "A-list". On this A-list were the names of 18 scientists. Nine, possibly 10, of the names were associated with the Riehl group which worked at Plant No. 12 in Ehlektrostal'. Born, Catsch, Riehl, Wirths, and Zimmer were on the list.

=== Return to Germany ===
When Wirths was released from Russia by the Soviet Union, he fled to Germany and took a job at Degussa as an authority in the production of reactor-grade uranium.

Wirths was well versed in the English language as he was featured in the 1988 NOVA television program Nazis and the Russian Bomb. In the program, Manfred von Ardenne was also featured; he was a German physicist who directed Institute A, in Sinop, a suburb of Sukhumi. In the documentary, Wirths told a story about the purity of Plant No. 12's production of uranium. Through espionage, the Soviets has procured a specimen of American uranium and compared it to that at Plant No. 12. The Soviet leaders praised the purity of Plant No. 12's uranium production.

Wirths, indicated that the Americans probably had optimized production output by allowing the purity to be less stringent, and said Plant No. 12 was probably "over doing it," to which one of the Soviet leaders responded, "You damned Germans!"

== Selected bibliography ==
- A. Böttcher, G. Wirths, and R. Schulten (Title translated from German) Fuel Elements for a High-temperature Reactor a publication of the Research Org Degussa, Frankfurt a.M.; Mannheim, Germany, 5 pages. US DoE OSTI ID: 4262639, Report Number(s) A/CONF.15/P/1005.
- G. Wirths and L. Ziehl (Title translated from German) Special Problems Arising in Connection with the Production of Uranium Metal and Uranium Compounds a publication of the Research Org Degussa Wolfgang near Hanau a.M., Germany, 14 pages. US DoE OSTI ID: 4261942, Report Number(s) A/CONF.15/P/1001.
- G. Wirths Problems of Chemists in the Production of Uranium and Thorium a publication of Research Org Deutsche Goldund Silber-Scheideanstalt, Wolfgang bei Hanau, 471–484. US DoE OSTI ID: 4298940, CODEN: APASA; 0001–6713.

== See also ==
- Russian Alsos
