= Karl Zimmer =

German nuclear chemist (1911–1988)

- Born: 12 July 1911; German Empire
- Died: 29 February 1988 (aged 76); West Germany (present day, Germany)
- Siglum: K. G. Zimmer
- Citizenship: Germany
- Known for: Radiobiology; Soviet program of nuclear weapons
- Scientific career
- Fields: Nuclear chemistry
- Institutions: Auergesellschaft AG; Kaiser Wilhelm Society; Plant No. 12 in Elektrostal; Karlsruhe Research Center
- Thesis: On the topics in Photochemistry (varies) (1939)

Karl Günter Zimmer (12 July 1911 – 29 February 1988) was a German nuclear chemist who is best known for his work in understanding the ionizing radiation on Deoxyribonucleic acid (DNA) and did fundamental work on radiation biology.

In 1935, he published the major work, Über die Natur der Genmutation und der Genstruktur, with Timofeev-Resovskij, and Max Delbrück; it was considered to be a major advance in understanding the nature of gene mutation and gene structure.

From 1945–1955, Zimmer was one of many German nuclear scientists in the former Soviet program of nuclear weapons but left Russia to eventually settle in Germany.

== Biography ==
=== Education and career ===
There is little or no information available about his early life but it is known that Zimmer obtained his doctorate in 1934 with a thesis on photochemistry from the sources provided by University of Tennessee.

Early on, Zimmer worked as an advisor in radiotherapeutic physics in a radiological hospital and as an employee of Auergesellschaft AG in Berlin. However, he completed most of his theoretical work at the Kaiser-Wilhelm Gesellschaft's Institut für Hirnforschung (lit. Kaiser Wilhelm Institute for Brain Research (KWIH)) in Berlin-Buch. Zimmer worked in Nikolay Timofeev-Resovskij's genetics department at the KWIH. Timofeev-Resovskij, a Russian national with Soviet citizenship, worked in Germany starting in 1924, and he stayed even after Adolf Hitler's party came to power in 1933. Very early in Zimmer's career, in 1935, he published the major work, Über die Natur der Genmutation und der Genstruktur, with Timofeev-Resovskij, and Max Delbrück; it was considered to be a major advance in understanding the nature of gene mutation and gene structure. At Auergesellschaft, Zimmer collaborated with Nikolaus Riehl, director of scientific research at the works.

At the close of World War II, Russia had special search teams operating in Austria and Germany, especially in Berlin, to identify and "requisition" equipment, materiel, intellectual property, and personnel useful to the Soviet program of nuclear weapons. The exploitation teams were under the Russian Alsos and they were headed by Lavrenij Beria's deputy, Colonel General A. P. Zavenyagin. These teams were composed of scientific staff members, in NKVD officer's uniforms, from the bomb project's only laboratory, Laboratory No. 2, in Moscow. In mid-May 1945, the Russian physicists Georgy Flerov and Lev Artsimovich, in NKVD colonel's uniforms, identified Zimmer and compelled him to take them to the location of Riehl and his staff, who had evacuated their Auergesellschaft facilities and were west of Berlin, hoping to be in an area occupied by the American or British military forces. Riehl was detained at the search team's facility in Berlin-Friedrichshagen for a week. This sojourn in Berlin turned into 10 years in the former Soviet Union for Riehl and his staff, including their families, were flown to Moscow on 9 July 1945. Riehl was to head up a uranium production group at Plant No. 12 in Ehlektrostal' (Электросталь).

=== In Russia ===
From 1945 to 1950, Riehl was in charge of uranium production at Plant No. 12 in Ehlektrostal'. When Riehl learned that Hans-Joachim Born and Karl Zimmer were being held in Krasnogorsk, in the main PoW camp for Germans with scientific degrees, Riehl arranged though Zavenyagin to have them sent to Ehlektrostal'. Alexander Catsch was also sent there. At Ehlektrostal', Riehl had a hard time incorporating Born, Catsch, and Zimmer into his tasking on uranium production, as Born was a radiochemist, Catsch was a physician and radiation biologist, and Zimmer was a physicist and radiation biologist.

After the detonation of the Russian uranium bomb, uranium production was going smoothly and Riehl's oversight was no longer necessary at Plant No. 12. Riehl then went, in 1950, to head an institute in Sungul', where he stayed until 1952. Essentially the remaining personnel in his group were assigned elsewhere, with the exception of H. E. Ortmann, A. Baroni (PoW), and Herbert Schmitz (PoW), who went with Riehl. However, Riehl had already sent Born, Catsch, and Zimmer to the institute in December 1947. The institute in Sungul' was responsible for the handling, treatment, and use of radioactive products generated in reactors, as well as radiation biology, dosimetry, and radiochemistry. The institute was known as Laboratory B, and it was overseen by the 9th Chief Directorate of the NKVD (MVD after 1946), the same organization which oversaw the Russian Alsos operation. The scientific staff of Laboratory B – a ShARAShKA – was both Soviet and German, the former being mostly political prisoners or exiles, although some of the service staff were criminals. (Laboratory V, in Obninsk, headed by Heinz Pose, was also a sharashka and working on the Soviet atomic bomb project. Other notable Germans at the facility were Werner Czulius, Hans Jürgen von Oertzen, Ernst Rexer, and Carl Friedrich Weiss.)

Laboratory B was known under another cover name as Объект 0211 (Ob'ekt 0211, Object 0211), as well as Object B. (In 1955, Laboratory B was closed. Some of its personnel were transferred elsewhere, but most of them were assimilated into a new, second nuclear weapons institute, Scientific Research Institute-1011, NII-1011, today known as the Russian Federal Nuclear Center All-Russian Scientific Research Institute of Technical Physics, RFYaTs–VNIITF. NII-1011 had the designation предприятие п/я 0215, i.e., enterprise post office box 0215 and Объект 0215; the latter designation has also been used in reference to Laboratory B after its closure and assimilation into NII-1011.)

One of the political prisoners in Laboratory B was Riehls' colleague from the KWIH, N. V. Timofeev-Resovskij, who, as a Soviet citizen, was arrested by the Soviet forces in Berlin at the conclusion of the war, and he was sentenced to 10 years in the Gulag. In 1947, Timofeev-Resovskij was rescued out of a harsh Gulag prison camp, nursed back to health, and sent to Sungul' to complete his sentence, but still make a contribution to the Soviet atomic bomb project. At Laboratory B, Timofeev-Resovskij headed a biophysics research department, in which Born, Catsch, and Zimmer were able to conduct work similar to that which they had done in Germany, and all three became section heads in Timofeev-Resovskij's department.

Before being rejoined in the Soviet Union, Zimmer, Timofeev-Resovskij, and Riehl had collaborated on the biological effects of ionizing radiation. Also, Zimmer and Timofeev-Resovskij had put together a manuscript which was a comprehensive summary of their work and that of others on radiation-induced gene mutation and related areas; the book, Das Trefferprinzip in der Biologie, was published in Germany while they were in the Soviet Union. In 1948, due to Lysenkoism, there were grave consequences for the institute in Sungul' in general and for Zimmer and Timofeev-Resovskij in particular. The book was put on a forbidden list and the laboratory was not allowed to conduct research on its topics. Since the book represented many years of Zimmer's life's work, he was rather downcast by the circumstances.

In preparation for release from the Soviet Union, it was standard practice to put personnel into quarantine for a few years if they worked on projects related to the Soviet atomic bomb project, as was the case for Zimmer. Additionally, in 1954, the Deutsche Demokratische Republik (DDR, German Democratic Republic) and the Soviet Union prepared a list of scientists they wished to keep in the DDR, due to their having worked on projects related to the Soviet atomic bomb project; this list was known as the "A-list". On this A-list were the names of 18 scientists. Nine, possibly 10, of the names were associated with the Riehl group which worked at Plant No. 12 in Ehlektrostal'. Born, Catsch, Riehl, and Zimmer were on the list.

=== In West Germany ===
Upon Zimmer's release from the Soviet Union in 1955, he eventually went to West Germany under legal circumstances, where he worked at the Kernforschungszentrum Karlsruhe (Karlsruhe Nuclear Research Center), founded in 1956 and later known as the Forschungszentrum Karlsruhe.

He became director of the Instituts für Strahlenbiologie (IStB, Institute for Radiation Biology).

== Internal report ==
The following was published in Kernphysikalische Forschungsberichte (Research Reports in Nuclear Physics), an internal publication of the German Uranverein. Reports in this publication were classified Top Secret, they had very limited distribution, and the authors were not allowed to keep copies. The reports were confiscated under the Allied Operation Alsos and sent to the United States Atomic Energy Commission for evaluation. In 1971, the reports were declassified and returned to Germany. The reports are available at the Karlsruhe Nuclear Research Center and the American Institute of Physics.

- Karl G. Zimmer Bericht über die Untersuchungen der relativen Wirksamkeit von Röntgenstrahlen und schnellen Neutronen bezügl. der Erzeugung von Chromosomenmutationen. G-297.

== Selected publications ==
The majority of these literature citations have been garnered by searching on variations of the author's name on Google, Google Scholar, and the Energy Citations Database, and use of a bibliography of N. V. Timofeev-Resovskij provided by the Laboratory of Radiation Biology of the JINR, Dubna.

- N. W. Timofeeff-Ressovsky and K. G. Zimmer Ein Beitrag zur Frage nach der Beziehung zwischen Röntgenstrahlendosis und dadurch ausgelöster Mutationsrate, Strahlentherapie Volume 51 (1934)
- Timofeeff-Ressovky, N. W., K. G. Zimmer, and M. Delbrück Über die Natur der Genmutation und der Genstruktur, Nachrichten von der Gesellschaft der Wissenschaften zu Göttingen: Mathematische-Physikalische Klasse, Fachgruppe VI, Biologie Bd. 1, Nr. 13, 189-245 (1935). Timofeeff-Ressovsky was identified as being from the Genetische Abteilung des Kaiser-Wilhelm-Instituts für Hirnforschung in Berlin-Buch. Zimmer was identified as being from the Strahlenabteilung des Cecilienhauses in Berlin-Charlottenburg. Delbrück was identified as being from the Physikalische-Radioaktive Abteilung des Kaiser-Wilhelm-Instituts für Chemie in Berlin-Dahlem. This paper, from the color of the journal's cover, has become known as the "Green Pamphlet" and sometimes as the Dreimännerarbeit (Three-Man Paper) of genetics, to distinguish it from the historical Dreimännerarbeit by Max Born, Werner Heisenberg, and Pascual Jordan, which launched quantum Matrix mechanics in 1925.
- N. W. Timofeeff-Ressovsky and K. G. Zimmer Strahlengenetische Zeitfaktorversuche an Drosophila melanogastery, Strahlentherapie Volume 53, 134-138 (1935)
- N. W. Timofeeff-Ressovsky and K. G. Zimmer Wellenlangenunabhangigkeit der mutationsauslösenden Wirkung der Röntgen und Gammastrahlung bei Drosophila melanogaster, Stranlentherapie Volume 54, 265-278 (1935)
- K. G. Zimmer and N. W. Timofeeff-Ressovsky Auslösung von Mutationen bei Drosophila melanogaster durch a Teilchen nach Emanationseinatmung, Strahlentherapie Volume. 55, 77-84 (1936)
- A. Pickhan, N. W. Timofeeff-Ressovsky, and K. G. Zimmer Versuche an Drosophila melanogaster über die Beeinflussung der mutationsauslosenden Wirkung von Röntgen- und Gammastrahlen durch hochfrequenzfeld und Äthernarkoze, Strahlentherapie Volume 56, 488-496 (1936)
- E. Wilhelmy, N. W. Timofeeff-Ressovsky, and K. G. Zimmer Einige Strahlengenetische Versuche mit Sehr weichen Röntgenstrahlen an Drosophila melanogaster, Strahlentherapie Volume 57, 521-531 (1936)
- K. G. Zimmer, H. D. Griffith, and N. W. Timofeeff-Ressovsky Mutationsauslösung durch Betastrahlung des Radiums bei Drosophila melanogaster, Strahlentherapie Volume 59, 130-138 (1937)
- K. G. Zimmer and N. W. Timofeeff-Ressovsky Dosimetrische und strahlenbiologischeversuche mit schnellen Neutronen II, Strahlentherapie Volume 63, 528-536 (1938)
- N. W. Timofeeff-Ressovsky and K. G. Zimmer Neutronenbestrahlungsversuche zur Mutationsauslosung an Drosophila melanogaster, Naturwissenschaften Volume 26, # 21-22, 362-365 (1938)
- N. W. Timofeeff-Ressovsky, K. G. Zimmer, F. A. and Heyn Auslösung von Mutationen an Drosophila melanogaster durch schnelle Li+D-Neutronen, Naturwissenschaften Volume 26, # 7, 108-109 (1938)
- N. W. Timofeeff-Ressovsky and K. G. Zimmer Strahlengenetik, Strahlentherapie Volume 66, 684-711 (1939)
- K. G. Zimmer and N. W. Timofeeff-Ressovsky Note on the biological effects of densely ionizing radiation, Phys. Rev. Volume 55, 411 (1939)
- N. Riehl, N. V. Timofeev-Resovskij, and K. G. Zimmer Mechanismus der Wirkung ionisierender Strahlen auf biologische Elementareinheiten, Die Naturwissenschaften Volume 29, Numbers 42-43, 625-639 (1941). Riehl was identified as being in Berlin, and the other two were identified as being in Berlin-Buch.
- N. W. Timofeeff-Ressovsky and K. G. Zimmer Über Zeitproportionalität und Temperaturabhängigkeit der spontanen Mutationsrate von Drosophila, Z. Ind. Abst. Verebl. Volume 79, # 4, 530-537 (1941)
- H. J. Born, N. W. Timofeeff-Ressovsky, and K. G. Zimmer Anwendungen der Neutronen und der künstlich radioaktiven Stoffe in Chemie und Biologe, Umschau Volume 45, # 6, 83-87 (1941)
- H. J. Born, N. W. Timoféeff-Ressovsky and K. G. Zimmer Biologische Anwendungen des Zählrohres, Naturwissenschaften Volume 30, Number 40, 600-603 (1942). The authors were identified as being in the genetics department of the Kaiser Wilhelm Institute in Berlin-Buch.
- N. W. Timofeeff-Ressovsky and K. G. Zimmer Über einige physikalische Vorgange bei der Auslösung von Genemutationen durch Strahlung, Z. Ind. Abst. Verebl. Volume 80, # 3, 353-372 (1942)
- N. Riehl, R. Rompe, N. W. Timoféeff-Ressovsky und K. G. Zimmer Über Energiewanderungsvorgänge und Ihre Bedeutung Für Einige Biologische Prozesse, Protoplasma Volume 38, Number 1, 105-126 (1943). The article was received on 19 April 1943.
- K. G. Zimmer and N. W. Timofeeff-Ressovsky Nachtrag zu der Arbeit über einige physikalische Vorgange bei der Auslösung von Mutationen, Z. Ind. Abst. Vererbl. Volume 80, # 4 (1943)
- N. W. Timofeeff-Ressovsky and K. G. Zimmer Strahlengenetik, Strahlentherapie Volume 74, 183-211 (1944)
- N. W. Timofeeff-Resovsky and K. G. Zimmer Über die Indeterminiertheit und die Verstarkererscheinungen in der Biologie, Naturwissenschaften Volume 32 (1945)
- A. Catsch, K. G. Zimmer, and O. Peter Radio-Biological Research with Fast Neutrons [In German], Zeitschrift für Naturforschung B: Anorg. Chem., Org. Chem., Biochem., Biophys. Volume 2, 1-5 (1947)
- N. W. Timofeeff-Ressovsky, K. G. Zimmer, and P. Jordan Über einige physikalische Vorgange bei der Auslösung von Genemutationen durch Strahlung. II. Auslösung von Genemutationen durch Strahlung, Z. Ind. Abst. Vererbl. Volume 82, # 1, 67-73 (1948)
- G. I. Born (H. J. Born), N. Riehl, K. G. Zimmer, Title translated from the Russian: Efficiency of Luminescence Production by Beta Rays in Zinc Sulfide, Doklaky Akademii Nauk S.S.S.R. Volume 59, March, 1269-1272 (1948)
- K. G. Zimmer On Strongly Absorbing Materials for Radiation Protection [In German], Fortschr. Gebiete Röntgenstrahlen vereinigt mit Röntgenpraxis Volume 71, 143-144 (1949)
- I. M. Rosman and K. G. Zimmer The Use of Scintillators in Dosimetry [In German], Zeitschrift für Naturforschung B: Anorg. Chem., Org. Chem., Biochem., Biophys., Volume 11B, 46-52 (1956)
- I. M. Rosman and K. G. Zimmer An Isodose Plotter of Simple Design, Br. J. Radiol. Volume 29, 688 (1956)
- K. G. Zimmer Problems of Neutron Dosimetry [In German], Strahlentherapie Volume 101, 143-151 (1956)
- L. Ehrenberg and K. G. Zimmer Action of Ionizing Radiation on Insulating Plastics, Acta Chemica Scandinavica Volume 10, Number 5, 874-875 (1956). Institutional affiliations: Univ. of Stockholm, Sweden; Max-Planck-Institut für physikalische Chemie, Göttingen, Germany.
- K. G. Zimmer The Atomic Research Center-Karlsruhe [In German], Atomwirtschaft, Atomtech. Volume 2, 434-435 (1957). Institutional affiliation: Institute for Radiation Protection and Radiation Biology.
- K. G. Zimmer, L. Ehrenberg, and A. Ehrenberg Determination of Magnetic Centers in Irradiated Biological Media and Their Importance in Radiobiology [In German], Strahlentherapie, Volume 103, 3-15 (1957)
- K. G. Zimmer Development and Present State of Hypothesis Formation in Quantitative Radiation Biology [In German], Naturwissenschaften Volume 45, 325-327 (1958). Institutional affiliation:Universität Heidelberg; Institut für Strahlenbiologie an der Reaktorstation, Karlsruhe, Germany.
- I. M. Rozman and K. G. Zimmer The Damage to Plastic Scintillators by Ionizing Radiations, Int. J. Applied Radiation and Isotopes Volume 3, 36-42 (1958)
- I. M. Rozman and K. G. Zimmer On the Use of Plastic Scintillators for Dose Measurements, Int. J. Appl. Radiation and Isotopes Volume 3, 43-44 (1958)
- K. G. Zimmer Evidence for Free-Radical Production in Living Cells Exposed to Ionizing Radiation, Radiation Research Supplement 1, 519-529 (1959). Institutional affiliation: Universität Heidelberg, Germany; Reactor-Station Karlsruhe, Heidelberg and Karlsruhe, Germany.
- A. Muller and K. G. Zimmer Some Application Possibilities of Microwave Spectroscopy in Quantitative Radiation Biology [In German], Strahlentherapie Volume 109, 192-199 (1959). Institutional affiliation: Reaktorstation, Karlsruhe, Germany.
- A. Muller, G. Hotz, and K. G. Zimmer Electron Spin Resonance in Bacteriophage: Alive, Dead, and Irradiated, Biochem. Biophys. Research Communs. Volume 4, 214-217 (1961). Institutional affiliation: Nuclear Research Center, Karlsruhe, Germany.
- A. Müller, G. Hotz, and K. G. Zimmer Kernforschungszentrum Karlsruhe. Sonderabdrucke. 73. Elektronischer Paramagnetismus in Bakteriophagen, Reprint from Zeitschrift für Naturforschung Volume 16b, Number 10, 658-662 (1961). Institutional affiliation: Institut für Strahlenbiologie, Kernforschungszentrum Karlsruhe, Germany.
- K. G. Zimmer Electron Spin Resonances in Biological Systems and Influencing by Radiation and Surrounding Gases [In German], Strahlentherapie, Sonderbände Volume 51, 46-57 (1962). Institutional affiliation: Kernforschungszentrum, Karlsruhe, Germany.
- K. G. Zimmer, W. Köhnlein, G. Hotz, and A. Muller Electron Spin Resonance in Irradiated Bacteriophages and Their Constituents. Part I [In German], Strahlentherapie Volume 120, 161-190 (1963). Institutional affiliation: Kernforschungszentrum, Karlsruhe, Germany.
- A. Muller, W. Köhnlein, and K. G. Zimmer X-Ray-Induced unpaired Spins in Nucleic Acid Bases and in 5-bromouracil, Journal of Molecular Biology (England) Volume 7, 92-94 (1963). Institutional affiliation: Kernforschungszentrum, Karlsruhe, Germany.
- G. Hotz and K. G. Zimmer Experiments in Radiation Chemistry of T1-Phage, Int. J. Radiation Biology; Volume 7, 75-86 (1963). Institutional affiliation: Kernforschungszentrum, Karlsruhe, Germany.
- K. G. Zimmer Contribution to the Radiobiological Basis of the Maximum Permissible Radiation Dose [In German], Nukleonik (West Germany) Volume 7, 380-383 (1965). Institutional affiliation: Kernforschungszentrum, Karlsruhe, Germany.
- K. G. Zimmer Some Unusual Topics in Radiation Biology, Radiation Research (U.S.) Volume 28, 830-843 (1966). Institutional affiliation: Kernforschungszentrum, Karlsruhe, Germany.
- F. Dauch, U. Apitzsch, A. Catsch, and K. G. Zimmer RBE of Fast Neutrons by the Release of Mutations in Drosophila Melanogaster [In German], Mutation Research (Netherlands) Volume 3, 185-193 (1966). Institutional affiliation: Kernforschungszentrum, Karlsruhe, Germany.
- K. G. Zimmer From Target-Theory to Molecular Radiobiology, Journal: Phys. Med. Biol. Volume 14, 545-553 (1969). Organizational affiliation: Kernforschungszentrum, Karlsruhe, Germany.
- Zimmer, K. G. Alexander Catsch's 60th anniversary [In German], Strahlentherapie Volume 145, Number 2, 238-239 (1973)
- H. Jung and K. G. Zimmer Physical and biological parameters of interest for evaluating the possible use of pi-mesons, neutrons and charged particles in radiotherapy [In German], Röntgen Bl., Volume 27, Number 8, 381-402 (1974). Organizational affiliations: Universität Hamburg, Institut für Biophysik und Strahlenbiologie; Kernforschungszentrum, Karlsruhe, Inst. für Strahlenbiologie.
- K. G. Zimmer Easy way to calculate the mean length of trajectories through bodies of given shape, Int. J. Radiation Biology, Volume 25, Number 3, 313 (1974). Institutional affiliation: Kernforschungszentrum, Karlsruhe, Germany.

=== Publications of the KFK ===
- K. G. Zimmer Kernforschungszentrum Karlsruhe. Sonderabdrucke. 27. Studien Zur Quantitativen Strahlenbiologie (Gesellschaft für Kernforschung m.b.H., 1960). Institutional affiliation: Institut für Strahlenbiologie.
- Gerhart Hotz, Adolf Müller and Karl Günter Zimmer Kernforschungszentrum Karlsruhe. Sonderabdrucke. 145. Elektron-Spin-Resonanzen in Bakteriophagen (Gesellschaft für Kernforschung m.b.H., 1962). Institutional affiliation: Institut für Strahlenbiologie.

=== Books ===
- Nikolaj V. Timofeev-Ressovskij and Karl Günter Zimmer Biophysik. Bd. 1. Das Trefferprinzip in der Biologie (Hirzel, 1947)
- Karl Günter Zimmer Studien zur quantitativen Strahlenbiologie (Steiner 1960)
- Karl Günter Zimmer Studien zur quantitativen Strahlenbiologie (Abhandlungen der Math-Naturw. Klasse, Jg. 1960, Nr. 3) (Verlag der Akademie der Wissenschaften und der Literatur, 1960)
- Karl Günter Zimmer Studies on quantitative radiation biology (Oliver and Boyd, 1961)
- Karl Günter Zimmer Studies on quantitative radiation biology (Hafner)

== See also ==
- Russian Alsos
