= Avraami Zavenyagin =

Soviet bureaucrat (1901–1956)

- Авраамий Завенягин
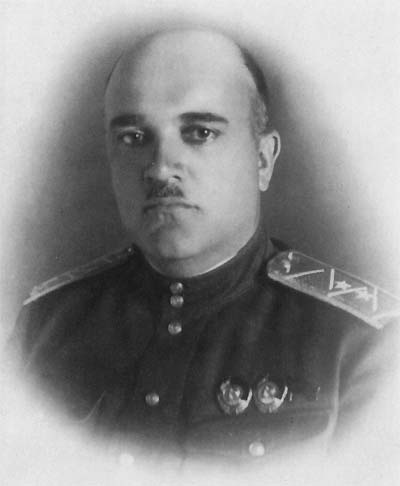
- Zavenyagin in 1946

Deputy Premier of the Soviet Union
- In office 28 February 1955 – 31 December 1956
- Premier: Nikolai Bulganin
- Preceded by: Mikhail Khrunichev
- Succeeded by: Vladimir Matskevich

Minister of Medium Machine Building
- In office 28 February 1955 – 31 December 1956
- Premier: Nikolai Bulganin
- Preceded by: Vyacheslav Malyshev
- Succeeded by: Mikhail Pervukhin

Personal details
- Born: Zavenyagin, Avraami Pavlovich (Завенягин, Авраамий Павлович); 14 April 1901 Uzlovaya, Tula Governorate, Russian Empire
- Died: 31 December 1956 (aged 55) Moscow, Russia in Soviet Union
- Cause of death: Heart failure
- Resting place: Kremlin Wall Necropolis
- Citizenship: Soviet Union
- Party: Communist Party of the Soviet Union (1917–1956)
- Education: Moscow Mining Academy
- Occupation: Plant manager, politician
- Cabinet: Bulganin's government
- Awards: Order of Lenin (1954); Stalin Prize (1951); Hero of Socialist Labor (1949)
- Civil service: Ministry of Internal Affairs
- Branch: Soviet Internal Troops
- Rank: Lieutenant general
- Service years: 1936–56
- Nickname: A. P. Zavenyagin

Avraami Pavlovich Zavenyagin (Russian: Авраамий Павлович Завенягин; 14 April 1901 – 31 December 1956), was Soviet politician and a security service operative who was a senior program manager in the Soviet program of nuclear weapons in the 1950s.

== Biography and early career ==
Avraami Pavlovich Zavenyagin was born in Uzlovaya, which is near Moscow, in a working-class family . His date of birth is noted as 1 April 1901 (O.S by internet source), which adjusted to as 14 April 1901 with New Style date system. His first name is also sometimes given as Avram or Abraham. Zavenyagin was ethnically Russian.

In 1917, he joined the Communist Party of the Soviet Union and was a devout communist who received his education and diploma from the Moscow Mining Academy (a predecessor of Moscow State Mining University) before starting his career as an engineer. Zavenyagin was made plant manager of the Magnitogorsk Iron and Steel Works in August 1933 and served in that capacity until 1936 when he was appointed the assistant to the People's Commissar of Heavy Industry.

From April 1938 until March 1941, Zavenyagin was in charge of the construction works at Norillag in Norilsk. While there, he established for himself and his subordinates "Zavenyagin's laws of management":

- First Law: Maximum performance in inhumane circumstances.
- Second Law: salvation (including your own) lies in extraordinary decisions.
- Third Law: youth is more an advantage than a disadvantage.

== Soviet program of nuclear weapons ==
On 8 December 1944, by decree of the State Defense Committee No. 7102 ss/ov, which accelerated geological exploration work for uranium, Zavenyagin was appointed responsible program manager for the search for uranium in the Soviet Union and in the occupied territories; to carry out the search, the 9th Chief Directorate of the NKVD was deployed. By the same decree, Zavenyagin managed the program to provide logistics concerning the vast mining operations throughout the Soviet Union where his program was to oversee the industrial production of uranium through factories and milling.

After the USSR State Defense Order of 20 August 1945 No. 9887ss/ov "On the Special Committee [on the use of atomic energy] under the State Defense Committee," Zavenyagin was responsible for the following areas of work:

- He became a member of the special committee and had a voice in resolving all issues within the jurisdiction of the committee.
- He became a member of the technical council of a special committee that dealt with issues of scientific research and scientific installations.
- From the moment of the formation (20 August 1945) of the First Main Directorate (PGU), Zavenyagin was its first deputy head and supervised the work of the special contingent.

Another important area of work was the solution of personnel issues: by Lavrentiy Beria's order, Mikhail Pervukhin, Vyacheslav Malyshev, Boris Vannikov, and Zavenyagin staffed the council sections with scientific and engineering personnel and selected experts to resolve individual issues. In addition, Zavenyagin participated in the selection of construction sites for plants of projects 817 (Mayak Production Association) and 813 (Ural Electrochemical Combine).

In 1945, Zavenyagin joined the commission under the leadership of member of the State Defense Committee Anastas Mikoyan: Chairman of the State Planning Committee Nikolai Voznesensky, People's Commissar of Electrical Industry Ivan Kabanov (politician), Head of the PGU Boris Vannikov, Zavenyagin, and Deputy Chairman of the State Planning Committee Nikolai Borisov. The commission was entrusted with overseeing the provision of Noginsk plant No. 12 (now ELEMASH Machine-Building Plant) with equipment for smelting uranium ore. This plant was equipped with Soviet-made vacuum high-frequency electric furnaces, created through war reparations from Germany and import purchases; uranium rods for the F-1 reactor were smelted in these furnaces.

In the same year, Zavenyagin's headquarters carried out an operation to search for German specialists and export them to the Soviet Union. These were metallurgists, chemists and physicists, including Nikolaus Riehl and Manfred von Ardenne, totalling 70 people in 1945 and over three hundred by 1948. Subsequently, Zavenyagin was responsible for their work.

In June and July 1948, Zavenyagin, together with Igor Kurchatov, supervised the liquidation of two accidents at the first domestic industrial reactor A-1, having spent a long time in the central reactor hall and being irradiated as a result.

On 19 August 1949, Zavenyagin was appointed responsible for the delivery of the RDS-1 nuclear bomb from KB-11 (now the All-Russian Scientific Research Institute of Experimental Physics) to the Semipalatinsk test site and for the final assembly of the bomb. On the night of 29 August, in his presence, a neutron initiator piston was installed in the central part of the bomb. Soon after the test, he drove a car to the center of the explosion, where the car got stuck in the dust formed after the explosion, and had to return on foot, receiving a large dose of radiation.

== Later career ==
A protégé of Lavrenti Beria, Zavenyagin survived the purge after the death of Joseph Stalin because of a long friendship with Nikita Khrushchev, which dated back to the 1920s. During the Khrushchev era, he headed the Ministry of Medium Machine Building, responsible for nuclear weapons production, for two years. He died of a heart attack in 31 December 1956 and was buried at the Kremlin Wall Necropolis on 2 January 1957.

For his contribution to the atomic project, by decree of 29 October 1949, Zavenyagin was awarded the title of Hero of Socialist Labor.

== Legacy ==
A bronze bust of Zavenyagin was installed in accordance with the Regulations on the title of Hero of Socialist Labor in his hometown of Uzlovaya.

A marble bust of Zavenyagin was installed in 1960 on the square named after him in Norilsk. In 1993, it was moved to the administration building of the Norilsk Mining and Metallurgical Combine, and later to the administration foyer (now the main administrative building of the Polar Branch of Norilsk Nickel). In 1976, A memorial plaque was installed on house No. 1 on Zavenyagin Street, Norilsk. A memorial plaque was installed in 2001 for the 100th anniversary of Zavenyagin's birth on the management building of the mining and metallurgical company Norilsk Nickel.

The A.P. Zavenyagin Prize was established in 1981 by the Norilsk MMC and the Taimyr District Trade Union Committee.

The icebreaker Abraamiy Zavenyagin escorts sea vessels along the Yenisei to the port of Igarka.

Streets named after Zavenyagin include:

- Zavenyagin Square and Street, Uzlovaya
- Zavenyagin Street, Magnitogorsk
- Zavvenyagin Street, Donetsk
- Zavenyagin Square and Street in Norilsk.
