= ELEMASH Machine-Building plant =

JSC Mashinostroitelny Zavod (ELEMASH)
- Company type: Public Joint Stock Company
- Industry: Arms industry
- Founded: 1917
- Headquarters: Elektrostal, Russia
- Parent: TVEL (Rosatom group)

The JSC ELEMASH Machine-Building Plant (Russian: Машиностроительный завод Электросталь, Plant No. 12) is a company based in Elektrostal, Russia. It is part of TVEL (Rosatom group).

Before and during World War II, the Elektrostal plant produced bombs and other munitions. After the war, it produced pure uranium for use in nuclear weapons and it also produced fuel elements for nuclear power plants.

== See also ==
- UEC-Perm Engines
