= List of Germans transported to the USSR via Operation Osoaviakhim =

Operation Osoaviakhim was a secret Soviet operation under which more than 2,500 former Nazi German specialists (Специалисты; i.e. scientists, engineers and technicians who worked in specialist areas) from companies and institutions relevant to military and economic policy in the Soviet occupation zone of Germany (SBZ) and Berlin, as well as around 4,000 more family members, totalling more than 6,000 people, were transported from former Nazi Germany as war reparations to the Soviet Union. It took place in the early morning hours of October 22, 1946 when MVD (previously NKVD) and Soviet Army units under the direction of the Soviet Military Administration in Germany (SMAD), headed by Ivan Serov, rounded up German scientists and transported them by rail to the USSR.

Much related equipment was also moved, the aim being to literally transplant research and production research centers such as the V-2 rocket center of Mittelwerk, from Germany to the Soviet Union, and collect as much material as possible from test centers such as the Luftwaffe's central military aviation test center at Erprobungstelle Rechlin, taken by the Red Army on 2 May 1945.

In the night of 21 October 1946, the day following the 1946 Soviet occupation zone state elections as well as the 1946 Berlin state election until 22. October 1946, soviet officers accompanied by a translator as well as an armed soldier stopped by the homes of German specialists, ordering them to pack their belongings. Trucks and trains had been prepared and were standing ready for the immediate transport of around 6,500 people against their will.

- 1,385 of these specialists had worked in the Ministry of Aviation developing planes as well as jet engines and Surface-to-air missiles,
- 515 in the Ministry of Armaments, primary concerned with development of liquid rocket engines,
- 358 in the Ministry of Telecommunications Industry (Radar and Telemetry),
- 81 in the Ministry of Chemical Industry,
- 62 in the Ministry of Shipbuilding (gyro and navigation systems),
- 27 in the Ministry of Agricultural Machinery (solid rocket engines),
- 14 in the Ministry of Cinema and Photographic Industry,
- 3 in the Ministry of Petroleum Industry and
- 107 in establishments of the Ministry of Light Industry.

== Key recruits by Operation Osoaviakhim (incomplete list) ==
- Hugo Schmeisser - arms designer, developed the first successful assault rifle, StG 44.
- Werner Gruner - arms designer, known for designing the MG 42, one of Nazi Germany's main general-purpose machine guns. Became an emeritus professor at TU Dresden in East Germany.
- Karl-Hermann Geib - physical chemist who, in 1943, developed the Girdler sulfide process which is regarded as the most cost-effective process for producing heavy water.
- Erich Apel - former rocket engineer at the Peenemünde Army Research Center, worked in the V-2 rocket program with Wernher von Braun. Apel later became a high-ranking East German party official and minister.
- Helmut Gröttrup - engineer and rocket scientist, worked in the V-2 rocket program. Invented the smart card in 1967.
- Fritz Karl Preikschat - electrical and telecommunications engineer, invented an improved dot matrix printing teletypewriter. Worked for both sides of the space race, as a lab manager for NII-88 and later a lead engineer for the Space division of Boeing.
- Brunolf Baade - aeronautical engineer and former Nazi party member, led the development of the East German Baade 152, the first jet airliner to be developed in Germany.
- Ferdinand Brandner - aerospace designer and former SS Standartenführer (colonel), played a major role in the development of the Kuznetsov NK-12 turboprop engine used on Tupolev Tu-95 bombers.
- Hans Wocke - airplane designer, former chief developer at Junkers Aircraft and Motor Works.
- Siegfried Günter - aircraft designer responsible for the world's first rocket-powered and turbojet airframes, father of the "thrust modulation theory".
- Friedrich Asinger - chemist and former Nazi party member well known for his development of a multi-component reaction, the Asinger reaction for the synthesis of 3-thiazolines.
- Alfred Rieche - chemist who discovered the Rieche formylation, a type of formylation reaction.
- Kurt Magnus - professor of applied mechanics and pioneer of mechatronics and inertial sensors.
- Alfred Klose - professor of applied mathematician and astronomer.

== Jet engine and aviation industry ==
=== Affected facilities ===
- Arado Flugzeugwerke, Branch Brandenburg-Briest
- Askania Werke AG, Berlin-Friedenau
- BMW, Unseburg bei Staßfurt
- DVL, Berlin-Adlershof
- Junkers, Dessau
- Heinkel-Werke Oranienburg, Oranienburg
- Heinkel-Werke, Rostock
- Zentralwerke Bleicherode (Merger of Institut Rabe and Institut Nordhausen, and Montania AG, Nordhausen)
- Siebel Flugzeugwerke, Halle
- Siemens & Halske, Berlin
- Airplane-OKB from Halle
- Instrumentation-OKB from Berlin
- OKB for Engines from Dessau
- OKB for Engines from Unseburg
- OKB for Diesel from Dessau

=== Locations of stay in the USSR ===
- Babuschkin near Moscow
- Yubileyny,
- Khimki, OKB-456
- Dserschinsk
- Gorodomlya Island – Island located on Lake Seliger, today Solnetschny, also referred to as Gorodomlya Branch of NII-88.
- Ilyinsky near Moscow
- Liskhimstroi, today Sievierodonetsk and the neighboring town of Rubizhne located in modern-day Ukraine
- Dubna, today Dubna 3, part of Dubna
- Podlipki, today Korolyov, sometimes referred to as Podlipki Branch of NII-88
- Orekhovo-Zuyevo at the Klyazma River located in Moscow Oblast
- Sawjolowo, today part of Kimry located in Tver Oblast
- Tushino, north of Moscow
- Uprawlentschesk, today part of Samara short called Upra.
- Walentinowka
- Podberesje

=== Affected specialists (selection) ===
In the following list, duration of stay in the USSR is stated, if known.

- Dr. Werner Albring, University of Hanover, Hannover (Aerodynamics Expert) (until June 1952)
- Erich Apel, Linke-Hofmann-Werke, Breslau (until June 1952)
- Friedrich Asinger, Martin Luther University of Halle-Wittenberg (until 1954)
- Brunolf Baade, Junkers, Dessau (from October 1946 to 1954)
- Georg Backhaus, Junkers, Dessau
- Werner Baum, Peenemünde Army Research Center, Karlshagen
- Josef Blass, Arado Flugzeugwerke, Branch Brandenburg an der Havel
- Günther Bock, Deutsche Versuchsanstalt für Luftfahrt, Berlin-Adlershof (until 1954)
- Hans Ulrich Brancke, Junkers, Dessau (until June 1952)
- Helmut Breuninger, Askania Werke AG, Berlin-Friedenau (until February 1958)
- Werner Buschbeck (1900–1974), Telefunken (Head of Transmitter development), Berlin
- Rudolf Coermann, Deutsche Versuchsanstalt für Luftfahrt, Berlin-Adlershof (Telemetry Specialist) (until June 1952)
- Gerhard Cordes, Junkers, Dessau
- Josef Eitzenberger, Radarspezialist, Institut Berlin (until 1958)
- Norbert Elsner, TH Dresden, Dresden (until June 1952)
- Matthias Falter, AEG-Kabelwerk Oberspree, Berlin-Oberschöneweide (until 1951)
- Helmuth Faulstich, Ernst-Orlich Institut, Danzig (until 1956)
- Hellmut Frieser, TH Dresden, Dresden (until June 1952)
- Karl-Hermann Geib, Leunawerke, Leuna
- Siegfried Günter, Heinkel-Werke Oranienburg, Oranienburg (until 1954)
- Helmut Gröttrup, Peenemünde Army Research Center, Karlshagen (until November 1953)
- Heinz Hartlepp, Askania Werke AG, Berlin
- Helmut Heinrich, TH Dresden, Dresden, und Junkers, Dessau (until June 1954)
- Paul Herold, Leunawerke, Leuna
- Dr. Johannes (Hans) Hoch, University of Göttingen, Göttingen (Chief Designer - Guidance and Control) (Died 1955 in the USSR)
- Heinz Jaffke (Construction of Testing Facilities) (until June 1952)
- Alois Jasper, Mittelwerk GmbH (Final assembly) (until November 1953)
- Heinrich Kindler, Telefunken and Askania Werke AG, Berlin (until February 1953)
- Prof. Alfred Klose, Versuchsstelle des Heereswaffenamts für Raketenversuche, Gottow (until June 1952)
- Kurt Kracheel, Ingenieurschule Gauß, Berlin
- Peter Lertes, Askania Werke AG, Berlin
- Dr. Kurt Magnus, University of Göttingen (until November 1953)
- Walther Pauer, TH Dresden, Dresden (until June 1952)
- Fritz Preikschat, Gesellschaft für elektroakustische und mechanische Apparate (GEMA), Berlin-Köpenick (until June 1952)
- Karl Prestel, BMW, Unseburg bei Staßfurt
- Heinz Rössing, Siebel, Halle
- Alfred Scheibe, Junkers, Dessau
- Rudolf Scheinost, BMW, Staßfurt
- Prof. Theodor Schmidt, University of Greifswald, Greifswald (Guidance) (until November 1953)
- Gerhard Schmitz, Ernst Heinkel Flugzeugwerke, Rostock (until 1954)
- Werner Schulz, Peenemünde Army Research Center, Karlshagen (until June 1952)
- Gustav Ernst Robert Schulze, Junkers, Dessau (until 1954)
- Willi Schwarz, Peenemünde Army Research Center, Karlshagen
- Heinrich Singer
- Karl Viktor Stahl (Specialist for starting procedures)
- Konrad Toebe, Arado Flugzeugwerke (Structural design of rockets, Statics)(until June 1952)
- Dr. Karl-Joachim Umpfenbach, Physikalisch-Technische Reichsanstalt, Berlin (Chief Designer - Propulsion) (until November 1953)
- Fritz Viebach, Peenemünde Army Research Center, Karlshagen (until November 1953)
- Heinrich Wilhelmi, DeTeWe Deutsche Telephonwerke und Kabelindustrie AG, Berlin (until June 1952)
- Hans Wocke, Junkers, Dessau
- Kurt Wohlfahrt (until November 1953)
- Dr. Waldemar Wolff, Krupp, Essen (Chief Designer) (until June 1952)

== Optical and glass industry ==
=== Affected facilities ===
- Carl Zeiss AG, Jena
- Jenaer Glaswerk Schott & Gen., Jena

=== Locations of stay in the USSR ===
- Izium
- Leningrad, NII-380
- Lytkarino
- Moscow
- Novosibirsk
- Kyiv
- Krasnogorsk
- Kolomna
- Zagorsk, today Sergiyev Posad

=== Affected specialists (selection) ===
- Horst Anschütz
- Oskar Bihlmeier
- Paul Gänswein
- Dr. Paul Görlich, TH Dresden und Zeiss Ikon, Dresden (until 1952)
- Karl Gundlach
- Georg Günzerodt
- Prof. Friedrich Hauser (physicist) (until 1952)
- Wilhelm Kämmerer (until 1953)
- Herbert Kortum, Friedrich-Schiller-Universität Jena, Jena (until 1953)
- Alfred Krohs
- Dr. Konrad Kühne
- Karl Linnemann
- Franz Peter
- Artur Pulz
- Willy Röger, Carl Zeiss Jena
- Herbet Schorch
- Wilhelm Friedrich Gottfried Schütz, Friedrich-Schiller-Universität Jena
- August Sonnefeld
- Harald Straubel
- Walter Süss
- Robert Tiedecken
- Hermann Weber (DKW Engineer) who died in captivity on 23 February 1948
- Fritz Winter
- Karl Papello, Carl Zeiss Jena (until 1952)

== Other affected facilities (incomplete) ==
Details as mentioned above are not known in this section.

- AEG-Kabelwerk Oberspree
- Hentschel, Staßfurt
- Filmfabrik Wolfen
- Farbfilmkopierwerk Sovexportfilm Berlin
- Telefunken, Berlin
- Wirkwarenfabrik Kötschen, Apolda
- Rheinmetall, Sömmerda
- Heavy Industry located in Chemnitz
- GEMA (Gesellschaft für elektroakustische und mechanische Apparate), Berlin-Köpenick
- Werke der IG Farbenindustrie AG: Leuna-Werke in Leuna, Buna-Werke in Schkopau, Farbenfabrik Wolfen, Elektrochemisches Kombinat Bitterfeld in Bitterfeld, Werke Ammendorf in Ammendorf, Werk Böhlen in Böhlen

=== Locations of stay in the USSR (selection) ===
- Svema in Shostka, Ukrainian SSR, Filmfabrik Wolfen#After World War II
- Gorki
- Zheleznodorozhnaya

=== Affected specialists (selection) ===
- Erich Habann, AEG-Kabelwerk Oberspree
- Paul Kotowski, Telefunken, AEG-Kabelwerk Oberspree
- Matthias Falter, AEG-Kabelwerk Oberspree (until 1952)
- Werner Holzmüller, Labor, Konstruktionsbüro und Versuchswerk Oberspree (LKVO) (until 1952)
- Alfred Rieche, I.G. Farben, Wolfen (until 1951)
- Kurt Meyer, Farbfilmkopierwerk Sovexportfilm Berlin (until 1950)
- Paul Täubert, Technisches Projektbüro Berlin, Berlin-Schöneweide (until 1952)

== See also ==
- Allied plans for German industry after World War II
- German influence on the Soviet space program
- Russian Alsos– German influence in Soviet program of nuclear weapons
- Operation Paperclip, US operation on German specialists
  - List of Germans relocated to the US via Operation Paperclip
