= Light water =

Light water or Lightwater may refer to:

== Science ==
- Deuterium-depleted water, which has a lower concentration of deuterium than occurs naturally on Earth
- Water, especially water that is not heavy water
  - Water, the coolant in a light-water reactor, a type of nuclear reactor

== Other uses ==
- Lightwater, a town in Surrey, England

== See also ==
- Semiheavy water, a form of water in which one of the protium atoms in light water is replaced with deuterium atoms
- Heavy water, a form of water that contains a larger than usual amount of deuterium molecules
- Super-heavy water, a form of water in which both protium atoms in light water are replaced with tritium atoms
