= Spevack =

Spevack is a surname. Notable people with the surname include:

- Jason Spevack (born 1997), Canadian actor
- Jerome S. Spevack, Canadian scientist, inventor, and engineer
- Melodee Spevack, American actress
- Ysanne Spevack (born 1972), British composer, conductor, and arranger
