= Nikolaus Riehl =

German nuclear chemist (1901–1990)

- Born: Nikolaus Vasilyevich Riehl; 1901; Saint Petersburg, Russian Empire
- Died: 2 August 1990 (aged 88–89); Munich, Bavaria, West Germany
- Education: Humboldt University of Berlin
- Known for: Soviet program of nuclear weapons
- Awards: Stalin Prize (1949); Lenin Prize (1949); Hero of Socialist Labor (1949)
- Scientific career
- Fields: Nuclear chemistry
- Workplaces: Auergesellschaft; Laboratory B in Sungulʹ; Technical University of Munich
- Thesis: Physik und technische Anwendungen der Lumineszenz (1929)
- Doctoral advisor: Lise Meitner
- Other academic advisors: Otto Hahn

Nikolaus Vasilyevich Riehl (Russian: Никола́й Васи́льевич Риль, romanized: Nikolai Vasilyevich Ril; 1901 — 2 August 1990) was a German nuclear chemist of Russian-Jewish descent. Before the fall of Berlin, he was director of the scientific headquarters of the Auergesellschaft AG, and was taken to the Soviet Union.

Riehl was one of many of the German nuclear physicist in the former Soviet program of nuclear weapons, for which, he was recruited in 1945 until 1955 when he was released from the Soviet custody after accepting a technical position at the Technical University of Munich in Germany. He was a recipient of many former Soviet honors which he was awarded for his work in the Soviet Union.

== Education ==
Nikolaus Riehl was born in Saint Petersburg, then part of the Russian Empire, in 1901.

His father, Wilhelm Gottfried Riehl, was a German working in Russia as an engineer employed by Siemens; his mother, Elena Riehl (née Kagan) was Russian and was of Jewish descent. Riehl was fluent in both German and Russian languages, and attended the German language schools in Russia. The family stayed throughout the World War I and left for Berlin in 1918; he enrolled to attend the chemistry program at the University of Berlin in 1920.

On topics of nuclear science, he collaborated with Otto Hahn on behalf of the Auer Company. Between 1927–29, Riehl defended his thesis in nuclear chemistry, working under Lise Meitner; his thesis contained work on the Geiger-Müller counters for beta ray spectroscopy.

== Career ==
=== Early years ===
After his doctorate in chemistry, Riehl completed his habilitation but took an employment in the German industry with Auergesellschaft, where he became an authority on luminescence. From 1927, he was a staff scientist in the radiology department and eventually headed the optical engineering department for the company in 1937. From 1939 to 1945, he was the director of the scientific headquarters.

During this time, Auergesellschaft had a substantial amount of "waste" uranium from which it had extracted radium. After reading a June 1939 paper by Siegfried Flügge on the technical use of nuclear energy from uranium, Riehl recognized a business opportunity for the company, and, in July of that year, went to the Heereswaffenamt (HWA) – the German Army Ordnance Office – to discuss the production of uranium. The HWA was interested and Riehl committed corporate resources to the task. The HWA eventually provided an order for the production of uranium oxide, which took place in the Auergesellschaft plant in Oranienburg, north of Berlin.

=== In Russia ===
Near the end of World War II, as the Allied forces were closing in on Berlin, Riehl and some of his staff moved to a village west of Berlin, to try and assure occupation by either the British or American forces. However, in mid-May 1945, with the assistance of Riehl's colleague Karl Zimmer, the Russian physicists Georgy Flyorov and Lev Artsimovich showed up one day in NKVD colonels' uniforms. The use of Russian physicists in the wake of Soviet troop advances to identify and "requisition" equipment, materiel, intellectual property, and personnel useful to the Russian atomic bomb project is similar to the American Operation Alsos. In early 1945, the Soviet war planners initiated the parallel efforts to that of American's where forty out of less than 100 Russian scientists from the Soviet atomic bomb project's Laboratory 2 went to Germany, Austria, and Czechoslovakia in support of acquisitions for the Russian program.

The two colonels requested that Riehl join them in Berlin for a few days, where he also met with physicist Yulii Borisovich Khariton, also in the uniform of an NKVD colonel. Riehl and his staff, including their families, were flown to Moscow on 9 July 1945. Eventually, Riehl's entire laboratory was dismantled and transported to the Soviet Union.

Other prominent German scientists from Berlin who were taken to the Soviet Union at that time, and who would cross paths with Riehl, were Manfred von Ardenne, director of his private laboratory Forschungslaboratoriums für Elektronenphysik, Gustav Hertz, Nobel Laureate and director of Research Laboratory II at Siemens, Peter Adolf Thiessen, ordinarius professor at the Humboldt University of Berlin and director of the Kaiser-Wilhelm Institut für physikalische Chemi und Elektrochemie (KWIPC) in Berlin-Dahlem, and Max Volmer, ordinarius professor and director of the Physical Chemistry Institute at Technische Universität Berlin. Soon after being taken to the Soviet Union, Riehl, von Ardenne, Hertz, and Volmer were summoned for a meeting with Lavrentiy Beria, head of the NKVD and the Soviet atomic bomb project.

When a Soviet search team arrived at the Auergesellschaft facility in Oranienburg, they found nearly 100 tons of fairly pure uranium oxide. The Soviet Union took this uranium as reparations, which amounted to between 25% and 40% of the uranium taken from Germany and Czechoslovakia at the end of the war. Khariton said the uranium found there saved the Soviet Union a year on its atomic bomb project.

From 1945 to 1950, Riehl was in charge of uranium production at Plant No. 12 in Elektrostal (Russian: Электросталь) German scientists, who were mostly atomic scientists sent by the Soviets at the end of World War II to work in the Riehl group at Plant No. 12, included A. Baroni (PoW), Hans-Joachim Born, Alexander Catsch (Katsch), Werner Kirst, H. E. Ortmann, Herbert Schmitz (PoW), Walter Sommerfeldt, Herbert Thieme, Günter Wirths, and Karl Günter Zimmer as well as Heinrich Tobien, formerly "Chemiemeister" at Auergesellschaft; Walter Przybilla, brother of Riehl's wife, and mentioned in this context, also spent 10 years in SU, but was not a scientist under Riehl. While Born, Catsch, and Zimmer had collaborated with Riehl in Germany, they were actually not part of Auergesellschaft but with Nikolay Timofeev-Ressovsky's genetics department at the Kaiser-Wilhelm Gesellschaft's Institut für Hirnforschung (KWIH, Kaiser Wilhelm Institute for Brain Research) in Berlin-Buch. Riehl had a hard time incorporating these three into his tasking at Plant No. 12 on his uranium production tasking, as Born was a radiochemist, Catsch was a physician and radiation biologist, and Zimmer was a physicist and radiation biologist.

Elektrostal Plant No. 12, by the last quarter of 1946, was delivering about three metric tons of metallic uranium per week to Laboratory No. 2., which was later known as the Kurchatov Institute. By 1950, Plant No. 12 was producing about one metric ton per day, and it was not the only metallic uranium production plant in operation.

After the detonation of the Russian uranium bomb, uranium production was going smoothly and Riehl's oversight was no longer necessary at Plant No. 12. Riehl then went, in 1950, to head an institute in Sungul, where he stayed until 1952. Essentially the remaining personnel in his group were assigned elsewhere, with the exception of H. E. Ortmann, A. Baroni (PoW), and Herbert Schmitz (PoW), who went with Riehl. However, Riehl had already sent Born, Catsch, and Zimmer to the institute in December 1947. The German contingent at the institute in Sungul never exceeded 26 – in 1946 there were 95 people at the facility, which grew to 451 by 1955, and the German contingent had already left a few years before that. Besides those already mentioned, other Germans at the institute were Rinatia von Ardenne (sister of Manfred von Ardenne, director of Institute A, in Sukhumi) Wilhelm Menke, Willi Lange (who married the widow of Karl-Heinrich Riewe, who had been at Heinz Pose's Laboratory V, in Obninsk), Joachim Pani, and K. K. Rintelen. The institute in Sungul was responsible for the handling, treatment, and use of radioactive products generated in reactors, as well as radiation biology, dosimetry, and radiochemistry. The institute was known as Laboratory B, and it was overseen by the 9th Chief Directorate of the NKVD (MVD after 1946), the same organization which oversaw the Russian Alsos operation. The scientific staff of Laboratory B – a ShARAShKA – was both Soviet and German, the former being mostly political prisoners or exiles, although some of the service staff were criminals. (Laboratory V, in Obninsk, headed by Heinz Pose, was also a sharashka and working on the Soviet atomic bomb project. Other notable Germans at the facility were Werner Czulius, Hans Jürgen von Oertzen, Ernst Rexer, and Carl Friedrich Weiss.)

Laboratory B was known under another cover name as Объект 0211 (Ob'ekt 0211, Object 0211), as well as Object B. (In 1955, Laboratory B was closed. Some of its personnel were transferred elsewhere, but most of them were assimilated into a new, second nuclear weapons institute, Scientific Research Institute-1011, NII-1011, today known as the Russian Federal Nuclear Center All-Russian Scientific Research Institute of Technical Physics, RFYaTs–VNIITF. NII-1011 had the designation предприятие п/я 0215, i.e., enterprise post office box 0215 and Объект 0215; the latter designation has also been used in reference to Laboratory B after its closure and assimilation into NII-1011.)

One of the political prisoners in Laboratory B was Riehls' colleague from the KWIH, Timofeev-Ressovsky, who, as a Soviet citizen, was arrested by the Soviet forces in Berlin at the conclusion of the war, and he was sentenced to 10 years in the Gulag. In 1947, Timofeev-Resovskij was rescued out of a harsh Gulag prison camp, nursed back to health, and sent to Sungul to complete his sentence, but still make a contribution to the Soviet atomic bomb project. At Laboratory B, Timofeev-Resovskij headed the radiobiology department at Laboratory B, and another political prisoner, S. A. Voznesenskij, headed the radiochemistry department. At Laboratory B, Born, Catsch, and Zimmer were able to conduct work similar to that which they had done in Germany, and all three became section heads in Timofeev-Resovskij's department.

Until Riehl's return to Germany in June 1955, which Riehl had to request and negotiate, he was quarantined in Agudseri (Agudzery, Russian: Агудзера) starting in 1952. The home in which Riehl lived had been designed by Max Volmer and had been previously occupied by Gustav Hertz, when he was director of Laboratory G.

For his contributions to the Soviet atomic bomb project, Riehl was awarded a Stalin Prize (first class), a Lenin Prize, and the Hero of Socialist Labor medal. As part of the awards, he was also given a Dacha west of Moscow; but he did not accept the dacha because he wanted to keep personal distance from the soviets and to return to his homeland. For work at Plant No. 12, Riehl's colleagues Wirths and Thieme were awarded a Stalin Prize and the Order of the Red Banner of Soviet Labor, also known and the Order of the Red Flag.

=== Return to Germany ===
In 1954, East Germany (the German Democratic Republic) and the Soviet Union prepared a list of scientists they wished to keep in the GDR, due to their having worked on projects related to the Soviet atomic bomb project; this list was known as the "A-list". On this A-list were the names of 18 scientists, dominated by members of the Riehl group, which worked at Plant No. 12 in Elektrostal.

While Riehl's work for the Soviet Union netted him significant prestige and wealth, his primary motivation for leaving Russia was freedom. Riehl arrived in East Germany on 4 April 1955; however, by early June he had fled to West Germany. Once there, he joined Heinz Maier-Leibniz on his nuclear reactor staff at Technische Hochschule München, where he made contributions, starting in 1957, to the nuclear facility Forschungsreaktor München (FRM). In 1961 he became an ordinarius professor of technical physics there and concentrated his research activities on solid state physics, especially the physics of ice and optical spectroscopy of solids.

== Personal ==
Riehl and his wife Ilse, had two daughters, Ingeborg (oldest) and Irene. Riehl had a son who had died of natural causes and was buried in Germany.

== Selected publications and patents ==
- P. M. Wolf and N. Riehl Über die Zerstörung von Zinksulfidphosphoren durch - Strahlung, Annalen der Physik, Volume 403, Issue 1, 103-112 (1931)
- P. M. Wolf and N. Riehl Über die Zerstörung von Zinksulfidphosphoren durch - Strahlen. 2. Mitteilung, Annalen der Physik, Volume 409, Issue 5, 581-586 (1933)
- Nikolaus Riehl Transparent Coating, Patent number: CA 350884, Patent owner: Degea Aktiengesellschft (Auergesellschaft), Issue date: June 11, 1935, Canadian Class (CPC): 117/238.
- Nikolaus Riehl Light-Modifying Article and Method of Producing the Same, Patent number: 2088438, Filing date: Jun 2, 1934, Issue date: Jul 27, 1937, Assignee: Degea.
- N. Riehl and H. Ortmann Über die Druckzerstörung von Phosphoren, Annalen der Physik, Volume 421, Issue 6, 556-568 (1937)
- N. Riehl New results with luminescent zinc sulphide and other luminous substances, Trans. Faraday Soc. Volume 35, 135 - 140 (1939)
- N. Riehl Die "Energiewanderung" in Kristallen und Molekülkomplexen, Naturwissenschaften Volume 28, Number 38, Pages 601-607 (1940). The author was identified as being at the wissenschaftlichen Laboratorium der Auergesellschaft, Berlin.
- N. Riehl, N. V. Timofeev-Resovskij, and K. G. Zimmer Mechanismus der Wirkung ionisierender Strahlen auf biologische Elementareinheiten, Die Naturwissenschaften Volume 29, Numbers 42-43, 625-639 (1941). Riehl was identified as being in Berlin, and the other two were identified as being in Berlin-Buch.
- N. Riehl, Physik und technische Anwendungen der Lumineszenz. Springer; Softcover reprint of the original 1st ed. 1941 (4. Oktober 2013). ISBN 978-3662017586
- N. Riehl Zum Mechanismus der Energiewanderung bei Oxydationsfermenten, Naturwissenschaften Volume 31, Numbers 49-50, 590-591 (1943)
- N. Riehl, R. Rompe, N. W. Timoféeff-Ressovsky und K. G. Zimmer Über Energiewanderungsvorgänge und Ihre Bedeutung Für Einige Biologische Prozesse, Protoplasma Volume 38, Number 1, 105-126 (1943). The article was received on 19 April 1943.
- G. I. Born (H. J. Born), N. Riehl, K. G. Zimmer, Title translated from the Russian: Efficiency of Luminescence Production by Beta Rays in Zinc Sulfide, Doklady Akademii Nauk SSSR Volume 59, March, 1269-1272 (1948)
- N. Riehl and H. Ortmann Über die Struktur von Leuchtzentren in aktivatorhaltigen Zinksulfidphosphoren, Annalen der Physik, Volume 459, Issue 1, 3-14 (1959). Institutional affiliations: Technische Hochschule und Liebenwalde, Munich; Deutschen Akademie der Wissenschaften, Munich.
- N. Riehl and R. Sizmann Production of Extremely High Lattice Defect Concentration in the Irradiation of Solid Bodies in Reactors [In German], Zeitschrift für Angewandte Physik Volume 11, 202-207 (1959). Institutional affiliation: Technische Physik der Technische Hochschule, Munich.
- N. Riehl, R. Sizmann, and O. J. Stadler Effects of Alpha-Irradiation on Zinc Sulfide Phosphors [In German], Zeitschrift für Naturforschung A Volume 16, 13-20 (1961). Institutional affiliation: Technische Hochschule, Munich.
- K. Fink, N. Riehl, and O. Selig Contribution to the Question of the Cobalt Content in Reactor Construction Steel [In German], Nukleonik Volume 3, 41-49 (1961). Institutional Affiliations: Phoenix-Rheinrohr A.G., Düsseldorf; and Technische Hochschule, Munich.
- N. Riehl and R. Sizmann Effects of High Energy Irradiation on Phosphors [In German], Physica Status Solidi Volume 1, 97-119 (1961). Institutional affiliation: Technische Hochschule, Munich.
- N. Riehl Effects of High Energy Radiation on the Surface of Solid Bodies [In German], Kerntechnik Volume 3, 518-521 (1961). Institutional affiliation: Technische Hochschule, Munich.
- H. Blicks, N. Riehl, and R. Sizmann Reversible Light Center Transformations in ZnS Phosphors [In German], Z. Physik Volume 163, 594-603 (1961). Institutional affiliation: Technische Hochschule, Munich.
- N. Riehl, W. Schilling, and H. Meissner Design and Installation of a Low Temperature Irradiation Facility at the Munich Research Reactor FRM, Res. Reactor J. Volume 3, Number 1, 9-13 (1962). Institutional affiliation: Technische Hochschule, Munich.
- S. Hoffmann, N. Riehl, W. Rupp, and R. Sizmann Radiolysis of Water Vapor by Alpha-Radiation [In German], Radiochimica Acta Volume 1, 203-207 (1963). Institutional affiliation: Technische Hochschule, Munich.
- O. Degel and N. Riehl Diffusion of Protons (Tritons) in Ice Crystals [In German], Physik Kondensierten Materie Volume 1, 191-196 (1963). Institutional affiliation: Technische Hochschule, Munich.
- R. Doll, H. Meissner, N. Riehl, W. Schiling, and F. Schemissner Construction of a Low-Temperature Irradiation Apparatus at the Munich Research Reactor [In German] Zeitschrift für Angewandte Physik Volume 17, 321-329 (1964). Institutional affiliation: Bayerische Akademie der Wissenschaften, Munich.
- N. Riehl and R. Sizmann The Abnormal Volatility of Alpha-Irradiated Materials [In German], Radiochimica Acta Volume 3, 44-47 (1964). Institutional affiliation: Technische Hochschule, Munich.
- H. Blicks, O. Dengel, and N. Riehl Diffusion of Protons (Tritons) in Pure and Doped Ice Monocrystals [In German], Physik der Kondensierten Materie Volume 4, 375-381 (1966). Institutional affiliation: Technische Hochschule, Munich.
- O. Dengel, E. Jacobs, and N. Riehl Diffusion of Tritons in NH_{4}-Doped Ice Single Crystals [In German], Physik der Kondensierten Materie Volume 5, 58-59 (1966). Institutional affiliation: Technische Hochschule, Munich.
- H. Engelhardt, H. Müller-Krumbhaar, B. Bullemer, and N. Riehl Detection of Single Collisions of Fast Neutrons by Nucleation of Tyndall Flowers in Ice, J. Appl. Phys. Volume 40: 5308-5311(Dec 1969). Institutional affiliation: Technische Hochschule, Munich.
- N. Riehl and F. Fischer Einführung in die Lumineszenz, Thiemig, 1971.
- N. Riehl, A. Muller, and R. Wengert Release of trapped charge carriers by phonons generated by alpha-particles [In German], Z. Naturforsch., Volume 28, Number 6, 1040-1041 (1973). Institutional affiliation: Technische Universität, Munich.
- N. Riehl and R. Wengert Charge carrier release in He-cooled crystals by phonon fluxes generated by impinging hot gas atoms, by heat pulses, or by alpha-particles, Journal: Phys. Status Solidi (a), Volume 28, Number 2, 503-509 (1975). Institutional affiliation: Technische Universität, Munich.

== Books ==
- Nikolaus Riehl and Henry Ortmann Über den Aufbau der Zinksulfid-Luminophore (Verl. Chemie, 1957)
- Riehl, Nikolaus, Bernhard Bullemer, and Hermann Engelhardt (editors). Physics of Ice. Proceedings of the International Symposium, Munich, 1968 (Plenum, 1969)
- Fred Fischer and Nikolaus Riehl Einführung in die Lumineszenz (Thiemig, 1971)
- Nikolaus Riehl and Frederick Seitz Stalin's Captive: Nikolaus Riehl and the Soviet Race for the Bomb (American Chemical Society and the Chemical Heritage Foundations, 1996) ISBN 0-8412-3310-1. This book is a translation of Nikolaus Riehl's book Zehn Jahre im goldenen Käfig (Ten Years in a Golden Cage) (Riederer-Verlag, 1988); Seitz has written a lengthy introduction to the book. This book is a treasure trove with its 58 photographs.

== See also ==
- Russian Alsos
