= Tetradeuteromethane =

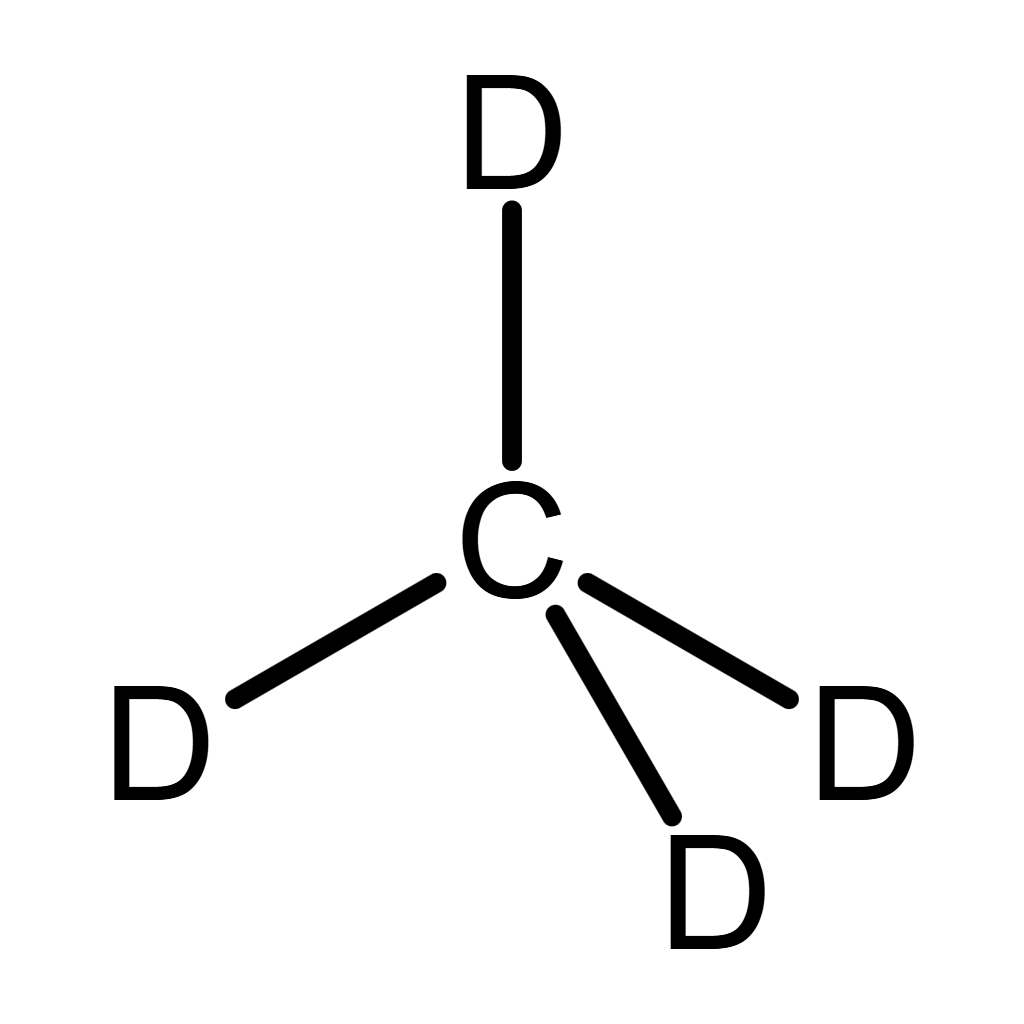

Names
- IUPAC name Tetradeuteriomethane
- Other names: (2H4)Methane; Carbon tetradeuteride; Heavy methane; Methane-D4; Methane-d4; Methane-d_{4}; Tetradeuteromethane

Identifiers
| CAS Number | 558-20-3 |
| 3D model (JSmol) | Interactive image |
| ChemSpider | 109692 |
| EC Number | 209-191-7 |
| PubChem CID | 123070 |
| CompTox Dashboard (EPA) | DTXSID30204377 |
- InChI: InChI=1S/CH4/h1H4/i1D4 Key: VNWKTOKETHGBQD-JQYAHLJZSA-N
- SMILES: C([2H])([2H])([2H])[2H]

Properties
| Chemical formula | CD_{4} |
| Molar mass | 20.067 g·mol^{-1} |
| Appearance | Colorless gas |
| Melting point | −183 °C (−297.4 °F; 90.1 K) |
| Boiling point | −161 °C (−258 °F; 112 K) |

Structure
| Molecular shape | Tetrahedral at C |

Hazards
- Occupational safety and health (OHS/OSH)
| Main hazards | Extremely flammable |
- GHS labelling
| Pictograms | (GHS02: Flammable) (GHS04: Compressed Gas) |
| Signal word | Danger |
| Hazard statements | H220, H280 |
| Precautionary statements | P203, P210, P222, P280, P377, P381, P403, P410+P403 |
| NFPA 704 (fire diamond) | 0 4 0 |
| Flash point | −18 °C (0 °F; 255 K) |
| Explosive limits | 5−15 % (by volume) |

Related compounds
| Related compounds | Deuterium fluoride; Heavy water; Trideuterioammonia; Methane |
- Except where otherwise noted, data are given for materials in their standard state (at 25 °C [77 °F], 100 kPa). Infobox references

Tetradeuteromethane, also called tetradeuteriomethane, is a chemical compound with the chemical formula CD_{4} or C^{2}H_{4}, where D and ^{2}H stand for deuterium. It is a colorless gas. It is a heavy analog of methane, where all four hydrogen atoms are replaced by deuterium atoms. The molar mass of deuterium is about twice the molar mass of hydrogen.

== Synthesis ==
Tetradeuteromethane can be synthesized by the reaction of aluminium carbide powder Al_{4}C_{3} with heavy water D_{2}O.

Al_{4}C_{3} + 6 D_{2}O → 2 Al_{2}O_{3} + 3 CD_{4}

It can also be synthesized by the reaction between heavy water and carbon tetrachloride in a boiling suspension of zinc.

== Properties ==
The relative molar flame ionization detection response for hydrocarbons does not change when hydrogen is replaced by deuterium. However, the exception is methane for which an inverse deuterium isotope effect of 3.5% is observed for tetradeuteromethane.

The molar mass of tetradeuteromethane is 20.067 g/mol, while of methane is 16.043 g/mol. The difference between molar masses is because the molar mass of deuterium is approximately twice the molar mass of hydrogen. In comparison to methane, the reaction rate of tetradeuteromethane is smaller. For example, tetradeuteromethane reacts with chlorine slower than methane. That is because the C−D bond is stronger than the C−H bond.

== Uses ==
Tetradeuteromethane is mainly used as a nuclear magnetic resonance reagent, for modifying optoelectronics, as a laboratory reagent and for scientific research.

== Reactions ==
The complete combustion of tetradeuteromethane produces carbon dioxide and heavy water.

CD_{4} + 2 O_{2} → CO_{2} + 2 D_{2}O
