= Heavy Water Board =

Indian government agency

The Heavy Water Board (HWB) is a constituent unit under the Department of Atomic Energy in the Government of India. The organisation is primarily responsible for production of heavy water (D_{2}O) which is used as a moderator and coolant in nuclear power as well as research reactors. Other than heavy water, the HWB is also engaged with production of nuclear grade solvents and extraction of rare materials. India is one of the largest manufacturers of heavy water in the world. Similarly, India has one of the world's largest fleets of pressurized heavy water reactors producing most of India's nuclear power supply.

== History ==
The research in heavy water production was initiated by the Chemical Engineering Division of the Bhabha Atomic Research Centre (BARC) in the 1960s and was continued by the Heavy Water Division of BARC where a pilot plant was operated for studying the H_{2}S-H_{2}O exchange process. While these studies were in progress, the Department of Atomic Energy (DAE) commissioned the first heavy water plant in India at Nangal, Punjab, India in the premises of National Fertilisers Limited (NFL) in 1962. The plant had to be dismantled owing to national security considerations arising out of the disinvestment of NFL. The plant used to be operated by NFL and the DAE ensured the quality of the product.

== Plants ==
HWB currently operating seven plants around the country.

=== HWP Baroda ===
Heavy Water Plant at Baroda is the first plant set up in India for the production of heavy water by employing monothermal ammonia-hydrogen exchange process. The plant is located 8 km north from Baroda railway station along the national highway No. 8, adjacent to the Gujarat State Fertilizers and Chemicals (GSFC).The plant was integrated with GSFC until 1999 when GSFC upgraded their ammonia plant to an incompatible low pressure system resulting in temporary suspension in the operations of the Heavy Water Plant.

HWP Baroda also has a potassium metal plant for supply of potassium metal for preparing catalyst solution for all monothermal ammonia-hydrogen exchange plants. The plant was expanded in 1987 to enhance the production capacity to 52 MT/year and has a capability to meet the demands of external customers also. This plant is based on Thermal reduction of Potassium Fluoride with Calcium Carbide initially developed by Hoechst A.G., Werk Griesheim, West Germany. An independent front end was added to produce Ammonia at this time. This plant was commissioned in 1975 with an initial rated capacity of 30 MT/year. The plant was awarded ISO-9001:2000 on 06.08.2002. with calcium carbide initially

=== HWP Hazira ===
HWP (Hazira) is the second heavy water plant in the country based on the ammonia-hydrogen exchange process which has been set up without foreign collaboration. It employs the ammonia-hydrogen exchange monothermal process. The plant is located at a distance of about 16 km from Surat city. Work on this plant commenced in August 1986 and the plant was commissioned in February 1991.

=== HWP Kota ===
The Heavy Water Plant at Kota is indigenously built and is based on the bithermal H_{2}O-H_{2}S exchange process. The plant is located in Rawatbhata at a distance of 65 km from Kota Railway Station, adjacent to the Rajasthan Atomic Power Station (RAPS). The Heavy Water Plant is integrated with RAPS for its supply of power and steam. An oil fired steam generation plant is also added to ensure uninterrupted supply of steam during the shut down periods of RAPS. Water from the nearby Rana Pratap Sagar reservoir, on the Chambal River, purified of suspended and dissolved impurities forms the process feed with the D20.

=== HWP Manuguru ===
The Heavy Water Plant at Manuguru, Telangana is based on the bithermal hydrogen sulphide-water (H_{2}S-H_{2}O) exchange process. This plant with a capacity of 185 tonnes per year is the second plant based on this process, the earlier one being at Kota, Rajasthan for which the complete technology has been developed indigenously by BARC and HWB. The Manuguru site was chosen because of its proximity to the Singareni coal fields and the Godavari river which provide respectively large quantities of coal and water required by the plant. It was commissioned in December 1991. It is the flagship plant of the Heavy Water Board.

It also has a captive power plant having 3 × 30 MWe generating capacity along with providing process steam to Heavy Water Plant production.

=== HWP Talcher ===
Heavy Water Plant at Talcher employs the ammonia-hydrogen exchange process (bithermal). The plant is located at a distance of 150 km from Bhubaneshwar. The work on this plant in October 1972 and it was commissioned in March 1985. Operation of the plant was suspended in August 1994 due to unsatisfactory operation of the fertilizer plant of the Fertilizer Corporation of India Limited, Talcher.

Subsequent to closure of the Heavy Water Plant in Talcher, the plant operation was resumed later and an R&D pilot plant has been commissioned for the production of di-2-ethyl hexyl phosphoric acid (D2EHPA), an effective metal extractant, used for hydro-metallurgical recovery and the separation of various metals. The solvent is useful for concentrating and purifying the valuable metal solutions of low-grade complex ores and is already being used by India's nuclear industry at various commercial operations for the separation and recovery of zinc, cobalt, nickel and lanthanides. In addition TBP is used in the PUREX process of nuclear reprocessing allowing the recovery of plutonium and reprocessed uranium from spent nuclear fuel. As the technology can be used both for high burnup fuel yielding reactor grade plutonium for use in MOX fuel and for extracting weapons grade plutonium from low irradiated fuel, the technology is inherently dual use. Presently HWP Talcher houses three chemical plants:

1. Di-2-ethyl hexyl phosphoric acid (D2EHPA)
2. Tributyl phosphate (TBP)
3. B-10 Enrichment Facility

=== HWP Thal ===
Heavy Water Plant Thal is the first of second generation plants in India and is made completely with indigenous efforts. It is located at Thal-Vaishet village in Raigad district of Maharashtra and is about 100 km south of Mumbai on National Highway No.66. The site is also accessible from Gateway of India, Mumbai by speedboats and Catamaran services. Work on HWP Thal was started in February 1982 and plant was commissioned in 1985.

=== HWP Tuticorin ===
HWP Tuticorin is located in the port town of Tuticorin in Southern India. The plant employs an ammonia-hydrogen exchange process (mono-thermal). The plant was commissioned in July 1978. Along with heavy water, the site is also engaged for production of different types of solvents, which will be used in the Indian Nuclear Industry, and other activities.

== See also ==
- Nuclear power in India
- Atomic Energy Commission of India
- India and weapons of mass destruction
