= Semiheavy water =

Chemical compound

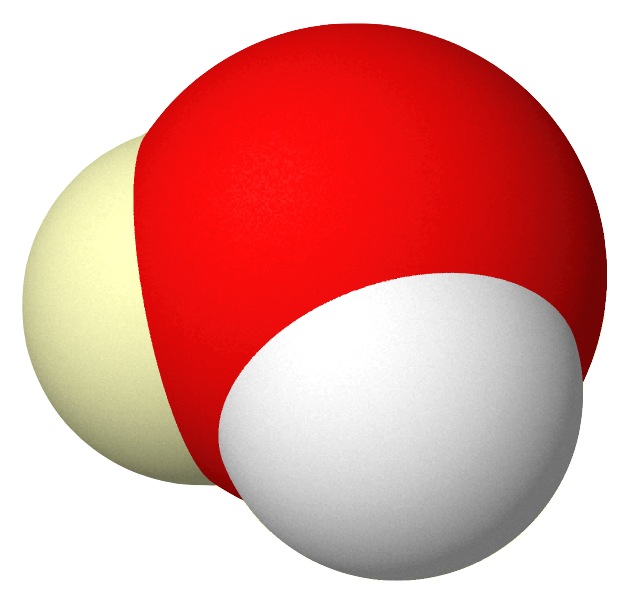
Spacefill model of water

Names
- IUPAC name (^{2}H_{1})Water
- Other names Deuterium hydrogen monoxide Deuterium hydrogen oxide, Water-d_{1}, Water-d

Identifiers
CAS Number	14940-63-7
3D model (JSmol)	Interactive image
ChEBI	CHEBI:33806
ChemSpider	123344
Gmelin Reference	115
PubChem CID	139859
CompTox Dashboard (EPA)	DTXSID50164262
- InChI: InChI=1S/H2O/h1H2/i/hD Key: XLYOFNOQVPJJNP-DYCDLGHISA-N
- SMILES: [2H]O

Properties
Chemical formula	H^{2}HO or HDO
Molar mass	19.0214 g mol^{−1}
Appearance	Very pale blue, transparent liquid, very similar to regular water
Density	1.054 g cm^{−3}
Boiling point	100.74 °C (213.33 °F; 373.89 K)
Solubility in water	miscible
- Except where otherwise noted, data are given for materials in their standard state (at 25 °C [77 °F], 100 kPa). verify (what is ?) Infobox references

Semiheavy water (HDO or HOD) is a naturally occurring chemical variant of water. Other variants include heavy water (D_{2}O), and H_{2}O. It shares most of its properties with common water (^{1}H_{2}O), with its distinguishing feature being a single hydrogen atom per water molecule being of the heavier isotope deuterium (^{2}H or D), as opposed to the far more common protium (^{1}H). This difference of one more neutron in one of the hydrogen atoms does not notably change its chemical properties, as these are mostly dictated by the number of valence electrons an atom has. The only notable difference to common water is a larger mass, as a result of the extra neutron per atom.

In an amount of water, about 1 molecule in 3,200 is HDO (one hydrogen in 6,400 is ^{2}H). By comparison, heavy water (D_{2}O) occurs at a proportion of about 1 molecule in 41 million (i.e., 1 in 6,400^{2}). This makes semiheavy water far more common than heavy water.

Semiheavy water (HDO) cannot be isolated in its pure liquid form since, owing to hydrogen exchange in water, it is in equilibrium with H_{2}O and D_{2}O. If however it were possible to weigh the same volume of HDO and H_{2}O, the HDO would be heavier, lending it its name.

== Production ==
Water may be enriched in HDO by distillation or electrolysis, or by various chemical exchange processes, all of which exploit a kinetic isotope effect. Partial enrichment also occurs in natural bodies of water under certain evaporation conditions. (For more information about the distribution of deuterium in water, see Vienna Standard Mean Ocean Water and Hydrogen isotope biogeochemistry.)

== See also ==
- Deuterium-depleted water
