= Russian Alsos =

Western term for Soviet harvesting of Nazi German nuclear assets, 1945-1946

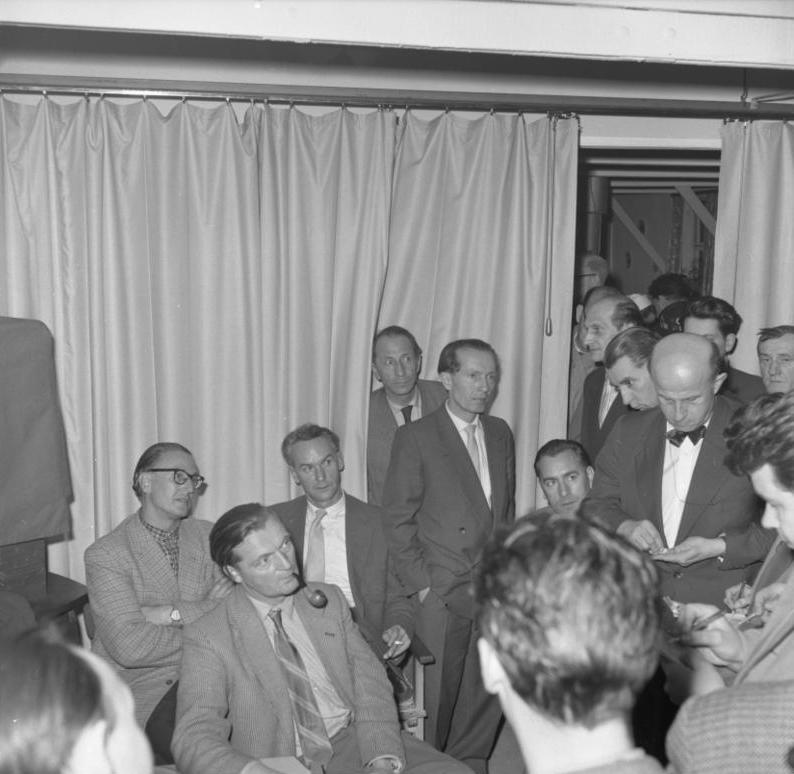
German scientists repatriated from Sukhumi in February 1958

The Soviet Alsos or Russian Alsos is the western codename for an operation that took place during 1945–1946 in Germany, Austria, and Czechoslovakia, in order to exploit German atomic related facilities, intellectual materials, material resources, and scientific personnel for the benefit of the Soviet atomic bomb project. The contributions of the German scientists is borne out by the many USSR State Prizes and other awards given in the wake of the second Soviet atomic bomb test, a uranium-based atomic bomb; awards for uranium production and isotope separation were prevalent. Also significant in both the first Soviet atomic bomb test – a plutonium-based atomic bomb which required a uranium reactor for plutonium generation – and the second test, was the Soviet acquisition of a significant amount of uranium immediately before and shortly after the close of World War II. This saved the Soviets at least a year by their own admission.

== Background ==
Near the close and after the end of World War II in Europe, the Soviet Union and the Western powers had programs to foster technology transfer and exploit German technical specialists. For example, the United States had Operation Paperclip and the Soviet Union had "trophy brigades" advancing with their military forces. In the area of atomic technology, the U.S. had Operation Alsos and the Soviet Union had their version. While operational aspects of the Soviet operation were modeled after the trophy brigades, a more refined approach was warranted for the exploitation of German atomic related facilities, intellectual materials, and scientific personnel. This was rectified with a decree in late 1944 and the formation of specialized exploitation teams in early 1945. However, the Soviet "Alsos" had broader objectives, which included wholesale relocation of scientific facilities to the Soviet Union. Authorized by the Council of People's Commissars and the State Defense Committee to receive reparations entrusted to Germany by the decision of the Potsdam Conference, the return of valuables and property taken out during the war was Iosif Titovich Tabulevich.

== Specialized teams ==
On 18 September 1944, a decree established a specialized task force within the 9th Chief Directorate (Главное Управление, Glavnoe Upravlenie) of the NKVD to support the work of German scientists "invited" to the Soviet Union. The head of the Directorate was Colonel General Avram Pavlovich Zavenyagin.

On 23 March 1945, in Stalin's office, Lavrentiy Beria suggested that specialized teams be sent to Germany to search for atomic technology and related personnel. The next day, he instructed Igor' Vasil'evich Kurchatov, head of Laboratory No. 2, to submit requirements on the formation of the specialized search teams to be sent to Germany, Austria, and Czechoslovakia. That very day, Beria also signed a directive appointing his deputy, Zavenyagin, in charge of the operation to locate and deport German atomic scientists or any others who could be of use to the Soviet atomic bomb project. Operational issues for the teams were assigned to SMERSH military counterintelligence. Two members of Laboratory No. 2, Lev Andreevich Artsimovich and Yulij Borisovich Khariton, were assigned to provide scientific guidance to the operation. While the entire scientific staff at Laboratory No. 2, the only atomic laboratory at that time, numbered less than 100, close to 40 of them were sent to Germany.

=== Main search team – Germany ===
The Battle of Berlin proved one of the last major engagements of World War II in Europe. With a great majority of German scientific facilities in Berlin and its suburbs, this area became a major target of the atomic-search teams. Haste was necessary, as the American military forces were rapidly approaching Berlin. Soviet troops broke the Berlin defense-ring on 25 April 1945, and the Soviet Union announced the fall of Berlin on 2 May. The main search team, headed by Colonel General Zavenyagin, arrived in Berlin on 3 May; it included Colonel General V. A. Makhnjov, and nuclear physicists Yulij Borisovich Khariton, Isaak Konstantinovich Kikoin, and Lev Andreevich Artsimovich. Georgij Nikolaevich Flerov had arrived earlier, although Kikoin did not recall a vanguard group. Targets on the top of their list included the Kaiser-Wilhelm Institut für Physik (KWIP, Kaiser Wilhelm Institute for Physics), the University of Berlin, and the Technische Hochschule Berlin.

The search teams occupied an entire building in Berlin-Friedrichshagen, which was large enough to also house German scientists recovered by the team. Unfortunately for the Soviet effort, the KWIP had mostly been moved in 1943 and 1944 to Hechingen, on the edge of the Black Forest, which eventually became part of the French occupation zone. This move and a little luck allowed the Americans to take into custody a large number of German scientists associated with nuclear research (see Alsos Mission and Operation Epsilon). The only section of the institute which remained in Berlin was the low-temperature physics section, headed by Ludwig Bewilogua, who was in charge of the exponential uranium pile.

== German scientists ==
=== Von Ardenne, Hertz, Thiessen, and Volmer ===
Manfred von Ardenne, director of his private laboratory Forschungslaboratorium für Elektronenphysik in Berlin-Lichterfelde, Gustav Hertz, Nobel Laureate and director of the Siemens Research Laboratory II in Berlin-Siemensstadt, Peter Adolf Thiessen, ordinarius professor at the Friedrich-Wilhelms University (today the Humboldt University of Berlin) and director of the Kaiser-Wilhelm-Institut für physikalische Chemie und Elektrochemie (KWIPC Kaiser Wilhelm Institute for Physical Chemistry and Electrochemistry ) in Berlin-Dahlem, and Max Volmer, ordinarius professor and director of the Physical Chemistry Institute at the Technische Hochschule Berlin in Berlin-Charlottenburg, had made a pact. The pact was a pledge that whoever first made contact with the Russian people would speak for the rest. The objectives of their pact were threefold: (1) Prevent plunder of their institutes, (2) Continue their work with minimal interruption, and (3) Protect themselves from prosecution for any political acts of the past. Before the end of World War II, Thiessen, a member of the Nazi Party, nevertheless had Communist contacts. On 27 April 1945, Thiessen arrived at von Ardenne's institute in an armored vehicle with a major of the Soviet Army, who was also a leading Soviet chemist, and they issued von Ardenne a protective letter (Schutzbrief).

Ardenne's institute was visited on 10 May by Colonel General Makhnjov, accompanied by Artsimovich, Flerov, Kikoin, and Migulin. At the end of the meeting, Makhnjov suggested that Ardenne continue his work in the Soviet Union. Ardenne agreed and put it in writing. On 19 May, Zavenyagin informed Ardenne that the Soviet government had proposed that Ardenne take over a large technical-physical research institute and continue his work. Two days later, Ardenne, his wife, his father-in-law, his secretary Elsa Suchland, and the biologist Wilhelm Menke, were flown to Moscow. Shortly thereafter, the rest of Ardenne's family and the contents of his laboratory were transported to the Soviet Union.

Von Ardenne was made head of a new institute created for him, Institute A, in Sinop, a suburb of Sukhumi. In his first meeting with Lavrentij Beria, von Ardenne was asked to participate in building the bomb, but von Ardenne quickly realized that participation would prohibit his repatriation to Germany, so he suggested isotope enrichment as an objective, which was agreed to. Goals of Ardenne's Institute A included: (1) Electromagnetic separation of isotopes, for which von Ardenne was the leader, (2) Techniques for manufacturing porous barriers for isotope separation, for which Peter Adolf Thiessen was the leader, and (3) Molecular techniques for separation of uranium isotopes, for which Max Steenbeck was the leader; Steenbeck was a colleague of Hertz at Siemens. While Steenbeck developed the theory of the centrifugal isotope separation process, Gernot Zippe, an Austrian who participated in the German nuclear weapons program, headed the experimental effort in Steenbeck's group. Even after nearly two decades, the work of Steenbeck and Zippe in the development of ultracentrifuges (Zippe-type centrifuges) was recognized in the West as very advanced.

The KWIPC was the only institute of the Kaiser-Wilhelm Gesellschaft which had not been moved out of Berlin in 1943 or 1944. Thiessen and a dozen of his most important colleagues were sent to the Soviet Union. At Institute A, Thiessen became leader for developing techniques for manufacturing porous barriers for isotope separation.

All of the equipment from Hertz's laboratory and his personnel were taken to the Soviet Union. Hertz was made head of a new institute created for him, Institute G, in Agudseri (Agudzery), about 10 km southeast of Sukhumi and a suburb of Gul'rips (Gulrip'shi). Topics assigned to Institute G included: (1) Separation of isotopes by diffusion in a flow of inert gases, for which Gustav Hertz was the leader, (2) Development of a condensation pump, for which Justus Mühlenpfordt was the leader, (3) Design and build a mass spectrometer for determining the isotopic composition of uranium, for which Werner Schütze was the leader, (4) Development of frameless (ceramic) diffusion partitions for filters, for which Reinhold Reichmann was the leader, and (5) Development of a theory of stability and control of a diffusion cascade, for which Heinz Barwich was the leader.

Volmer was initially assigned to Institute G. Late in January 1946, Volmer was assigned to the Nauchno-Issledovatel'skij Institut-9 (NII-9, Scientific Research Institute No. 9), in Moscow; he was given a design bureau to work on the production of heavy water. Volmer's group with Victor Bayerl (physical chemist) and Gustav Richter (physicist) was under Alexander Mikailovich Rosen, and they designed a heavy water production process and facility based on the counterflow of ammonia. The installation was constructed at Norilsk and completed in 1948, after which Volmer's organization was transferred to Zinaida Yershova's group, which worked on plutonium extraction from fission products.

=== Nikolaus Riehl ===
From 1939 to 1945, Nikolaus Riehl was the director of the scientific headquarters of the Auergesellschaft in Rheinsberg (Brandenburg). In 1939, he realized that the large stocks of "waste" uranium from the corporation's extraction of radium, had potential for nuclear energy. He worked with the Heereswaffenamt (HWA, Army Ordnance Office) which eventually provided an order for the production of uranium oxide, which took place in the Auergesellschaft plant in Oranienburg, north of Berlin.

Near the close of World War II, as American, British, and Soviet military forces were closing in on Berlin, Riehl and some of his staff moved to a village west of Berlin, to try and assure occupation by British or American forces. However, in mid-May 1945, with the assistance of Riehl's colleague Karl Günter Zimmer, the Soviet nuclear physicists Georgy Flerov and Lev Artsimovich showed up one day in NKVD colonel's uniforms. The two colonels requested that Riehl join them in Berlin for a few days, where Riehl met with nuclear physicist Yulii Borisovich Khariton, also in the uniform of an NKVD colonel. Riehl was detained at the search team's facility in Berlin-Friedrichshagen for a week. This sojourn in Berlin turned into 10 years in the Soviet Union. Riehl and his staff, including their families, were flown to Moscow on 9 July 1945.

From 1945 to 1950, Riehl was in charge of uranium production at Plant 12 in Ehlektrostal' (Электросталь). After the detonation of the Soviet uranium bomb, uranium production was going smoothly and Riehl's oversight was no longer necessary at Plant No. 12. Riehl then went, in 1950, to head an institute in Sungul', where he stayed until 1952. Essentially the remaining personnel in his group were assigned elsewhere, with the exception of H. E. Ortmann, A. Baroni (PoW), and Herbert Schmitz (PoW), who went with Riehl. However, Riehl had already sent Born, Catsch, and Zimmer to the institute in December 1947. The institute in Sungul' was responsible for the handling, treatment, and use of radioactive products generated in reactors, as well as radiation biology, dosimetry, and radiochemistry. The institute was known as Laboratory B, and it was overseen by the 9th Chief Directorate of the NKVD (MVD after 1946), the same organization which oversaw the Soviet Alsos operation. The scientific staff of Laboratory B – a ShARAShKA – was both Soviet and German, the former being mostly political prisoners or exiles, although some of the service staff were criminals. (Laboratory V, in Obninsk, headed by Heinz Pose, was also a sharashka and working on the Soviet atomic bomb project. Other notable Germans at the facility were Werner Czulius, Hans Jürgen von Oertzen, Ernst Rexer, and Carl Friedrich Weiss.)

Laboratory B was known under another cover name as Объект 0211 (Ob'ekt 0211, Object 0211), as well as Object B. (In 1955, Laboratory B was closed. Some of its personnel were transferred elsewhere, but most of them were assimilated into a new, second nuclear weapons institute, Scientific Research Institute-1011, NII-1011, today known as the Russian Federal Nuclear Center All-Russian Scientific Research Institute of Technical Physics, RFYaTs–VNIITF. NII-1011 had the designation предприятие п/я 0215, i.e., enterprise post office box 0215 and Объект 0215; the latter designation has also been used in reference to Laboratory B after its closure and assimilation into NII-1011.)

One of the prisoners in Laboratory B was Riehls' colleague from the KWIH, N. V. Timofeev-Resovskij, who, as a Soviet citizen, was arrested by the Soviet forces in Berlin at the conclusion of the war and eventually sentenced to 10 years in the Gulag. In 1947, Timofeev-Resovskij was rescued out of a harsh Gulag prison camp, nursed back to health, and sent to Sungul' to complete his sentence, but still make a contribution to the Soviet atomic bomb project. At Laboratory B, Timofeev-Resovskij headed a biophysics research department.

Until Riehl's return to Germany in June 1955, which Riehl had to request and negotiate, he was quarantined in Agudseri (Agudzery) starting in 1952. The home in which Riehl lived had been designed by Volmer and had been previously occupied by Hertz, when he was director of Laboratory G.

=== Karl-Hermann Geib ===
In 1946, Max Vollmer proposed a new method of heavy water production and was transferred from Institute G to NII-9 in Moscow, whereupon the Soviet Union deported en masse from Leunawerke, at 4:15 a.m. on 21 October 1946, all former Nazi Germany heavy water scientists, including Karl-Hermann Geib who, in parallel with Jerome S. Spevack, in 1943, invented the Girdler sulfide process for filtering out of natural water the heavy water used in particle research that is still used today. After applying to the Canadian Embassy in Moscow for asylum (exact date classified) giving the name of Professor E. W. R. Steacie as a reference, Geib was told to come back the next day. That was the last time he was seen and his wife in Germany received his effects in the mail.

=== Other personnel ===
Few of the scientists sent to the Soviet Union by Zavenyagin in the first six weeks complained. Take the case of Heinz Barwich. In addition to his leftist political views, he stated that he was motivated to go to work in the Soviet Union as he was 33 years old, married, had three small children with a fourth on the way, and unemployed.

Ludwig Bewilogua, head of the KWIP's low temperature physics section, had remained behind and in charge of the exponential uranium pile after the other sections were moved to Hechingen. He, his staff, and the entire facility contents were taken to the Soviet Union. Other scientists sent to the Soviet Union included Robert Döpel (atomic scientist from Leipzig), Wilhelm Eitel (chemist), Reinhold Reichmann (isotope separation, sent to work with Barwich), Gustav Richter (a colleague of Hertz at Siemens and assigned to heavy water production at NII-9), W. Schütze (isotope separation and cyclotrons) and Karl Günter Zimmer (atomic physicist and biologist from the Kaiser-Wilhelm Gesellschaft Institute for Brain Research in Berlin-Buch and also working with Riehl at Auergesellschaft).

To get an appreciation for the numbers eventually sent to the Soviet Union for the Soviet atomic bomb project, Oleynikov cites that by the end of the 1940s, there were nearly 300 Germans working at von Ardenne's Institute A, and they were not the entire workforce at the institute. Nor were the 300 there the total German personnel sent to work on the Soviet atomic bomb project.

Zavenyagin's search teams were aggressive in identifying technology and personnel for use in the Soviet atomic bomb project and sending materiel, equipment, and personnel to the Soviet Union. There can be no doubt that the success of the Soviet "Alsos" influenced the even grander and broader exploitative Operation Osoaviakhim. On the night of 21 October 1946, NKVD and Soviet Army units, commanded by Beria's chief deputy Colonel General Ivan Serov, began rounding up in short order thousands of German scientists and technicians of all types across the Eastern zone, along with their families, and transporting them to the Soviet Union in 92 different trains for work in the Soviet armaments industry.

=== State prizes ===
In 1947, Ardenne was awarded a Stalin Prize for his development of a table-top electron microscope. In 1953, before his return to Germany, he was awarded a Stalin Prize, first class, for contributions to the atomic bomb project; the money from this prize, 100,000 Rubles, was used to buy the land for his private institute in East Germany. According to an agreement that Ardenne made with authorities in the Soviet Union soon after his arrival, the equipment which he brought to the Soviet Union from his laboratory in Berlin-Lichterfelde was not to be considered as reparations to the Soviet Union. Ardenne took the equipment with him in December 1954 when he went to East Germany.

In 1951, Hertz was awarded a Stalin Prize, second class, with Barwich. Hertz remained in the Soviet Union until 1955, when he went to East Germany. Thiessen received a Stalin Prize, first class, for the development of uranium enrichment technologies. He went to East Germany in the mid-fifties. Riehl was awarded a Stalin Prize (first class), Lenin Prize, and Hero of Socialist Labor. As part of the awards, he was also given a Dacha west of Moscow; he did not use the dacha. In 1955 he passed through East Germany on his way to West Germany.

== Uranium ==
In the early stages, the Soviet atomic bomb project was in critical need of uranium. In May 1945, the sole atomic laboratory, Laboratory No. 2, only had seven tons of uranium oxide available. The critical nature of their stock can be realized when compared to the amounts needed for their first uranium reactor F-1 and their first plutonium production reactor "A" in the Urals. The first load of F-1 required 46 tons. The first load of reactor "A" required 150 tons.

The Soviet search teams deployed to Germany, Austria, and Czechoslovakia were aware of the Soviet needs for uranium. However, Major General Leslie Groves, the director of the Manhattan Project was also aware of the needs of his effort and that of the Soviet atomic bomb project for uranium. Hence, he arranged for the Alsos Mission to remove 1,200 tons of uranium ore from a salt mine near Stassfurt, an area due to fall within the Soviet occupation zone. This turned out to be the bulk of the German stock of uranium ore.

As soon as the Soviet troops occupied Vienna, a search team was sent to Austria. Vladimir Shevchenko, director of Scientific Research Institute No. 9 (NII-9), and atomic scientist Igor' Nikolaevich Golovin from Laboratory No. 2 stayed in Vienna from 13 April to 10 May 1945. In Vienna, they interviewed scientists from the Radium Institute of the Academy of Sciences and from the Second Physical Institute of the University of Vienna. Information collected provided an overview of German organizations involved in the uranium project, including companies potentially engaged in metallic uranium production. In an Auergesellschaft building there, they retrieved 340 kilograms of metallic uranium, a precursor to what would be found in Germany, as indeed Auergesellschaft was a main producer.

The Auergesellschaft facility in Oranienburg had nearly 100 metric tons of fairly pure uranium oxide, which a search team found. The Americans had bombed the facility near the end of the war to deny the works to the Soviets. The Soviet Union took this uranium as reparations, which amounted to between 25% and 40% of the uranium taken from Germany and Czechoslovakia at the end of the war. Khariton said the uranium found there saved the Soviet Union a year on its atomic bomb project.

Khariton and Kikoin, not knowing about the find in Oranienburg, started an intensive search of their own. From inspecting a plant in the Grunau district, they learned that the company Rohes had shipped several hundred tons of uranium, but they could not then determine the final destination. While in Potsdam, they determined the name of the head of the Belgian office of Rohes. The services of SMERSh military counterintelligence were used to find and arrest the man and bring him to the two physicists. Under questioning by SMERSh, the man revealed that the uranium was in Neustadt. Unfortunately, there were about 20 towns in Germany with that name, 10 of them were in the Soviet zone of occupation. In Neustadt-Glewe, they found more than 100 tons of uranium oxide. Another major find for the Soviet atomic bomb project.

== See also ==
- Operation Osoaviakhim

== Bibliography ==
- Albrecht, Ulrich, Andreas Heinemann-Grüder, and Arend Wellmann Die Spezialisten: Deutsche Naturwissenschaftler und Techniker in der Sowjetunion nach 1945 (Dietz, 1992, 2001) ISBN 3-320-01788-8
- Ardenne, Manfred von Erinnerungen, fortgeschrieben (Droste, 1997) ISBN 3-7700-1088-4
- Barwich, Heinz and Elfi Barwich Das rote Atom (Fischer-TB.-Vlg., 1984)
- Gimbel, John Science, Technology, and Reparations: Exploitation and Plunder in Postwar Germany (Stanford University Press, 1990)
- Gimbel, John U.S. Policy and German Scientists: The Early Cold War, Political Science Quarterly Volume 101, Number 3, 433–451 (1986)
- Heinemann-Grüder, Andreas Die sowjetische Atombombe (Westfaelisches Dampfboot, 1992)
- Heinemann-Grüder, Andreas Keinerlei Untergang: German Armaments Engineers during the Second World War and in the Service of the Victorious Powers in Monika Renneberg and Mark Walker (editors) Science, Technology and National Socialism 30–50 (Cambridge, 2002 paperback edition) ISBN 0-521-52860-7
- Hentschel, Klaus (editor) and Ann M. Hentschel (editorial assistant and translator) Physics and National Socialism: An Anthology of Primary Sources (Birkhäuser, 1996) ISBN 0-8176-5312-0
- Holloway, David Stalin and the Bomb: The Soviet Union and Atomic Energy 1939–1956 (Yale, 1994) ISBN 0-300-06056-4
- Kruglov, Arkadii The History of the Soviet Atomic Industry (Taylor and Francis, 2002)
- Maddrell, Paul "Spying on Science: Western Intelligence in Divided Germany 1945–1961" (Oxford, 2006) ISBN 0-19-926750-2
- Mehra, Jagdish, and Helmut Rechenberg The Historical Development of Quantum Theory. Volume 1 Part 1 The Quantum Theory of Planck, Einstein, Bohr and Sommerfeld 1900–1925: Its Foundation and the Rise of Its Difficulties. (Springer, 2001) ISBN 0-387-95174-1
- Naimark, Norman M. The Russians in Germany: A History of the Soviet Zone of Occupation, 1945–1949 (Belknap, 1995)
- Oleynikov, Pavel V. German Scientists in the Soviet Atomic Project, The Nonproliferation Review Volume 7, Number 2, pp. 1–30, (2000), ISSN 1073-6700, Monterey Institute of International Studies. The author has been a group leader at the Institute of Technical Physics of the Russian Federal Nuclear Center in Snezhinsk (Chelyabinsk-70).
- Riehl, Nikolaus and Frederick Seitz Stalin's Captive: Nikolaus Riehl and the Soviet Race for the Bomb (American Chemical Society and the Chemical Heritage Foundations, 1996) ISBN 0-8412-3310-1.
- Max Steenbeck Impulse und Wirkungen. Schritte auf meinem Lebensweg. (Verlag der Nation, 1977)
