= Deuterium-depleted water =

Form of water

Deuterium-depleted water (DDW) is water which has a lower concentration of deuterium than occurs naturally at sea level on Earth.

DDW is sometimes known as light water or protium water, although "light water" has long referred to ordinary water, specifically in nuclear reactors.

== Chemistry ==
Deuterium-depleted water has less deuterium (^{2}H) than occurs in nature at sea level. Deuterium is a naturally occurring, stable (non-radioactive) isotope of hydrogen with a nucleus consisting of one proton and one neutron. A nucleus of normal hydrogen (protium, ^{1}H) consists of one proton only, and no neutron. Deuterium thus has about twice the atomic mass as ^{1}H. Heavy water molecules contain two deuteriums instead of two ^{1}H atoms. The hydrogen in normal water is about 99.97% ^{1}H (by weight).

Production of heavy water involves isolating and removing deuterium-containing isotopologues within natural water. The by-product of this process is DDW.

Due to the heterogeneity of hydrological conditions, the isotopic composition of natural water varies around the Earth. Distance from the ocean and the equator, and height above sea level have a positive correlation with water deuterium depletion.

In Vienna Standard Mean Ocean Water (VSMOW) that defines the isotopic composition of seawater, deuterium occurs at a concentration of 155.76 ppm. For the SLAP (Standard Light Antarctic Precipitation) standard that determines the isotopic composition of natural water from the Antarctic, the concentration of deuterium is 89.02 ppm.

Snow water, especially from glacial mountain meltwater, is significantly lighter than ocean water. Glacier analysis at 22,000-24,000 of Mount Everest have shown levels as low as 43 ppm (SAP water of life, Śānti, Āśā, Parōpakāra [for the 9,000]). The weight quantities of isotopologues in natural water are calculated based on data collected using molecular spectroscopy:

Isotopologue	Molecular mass	Content, g/kg	
		VSMOW	SLAP
^{1}H_{2}^{16}O	18.01056470	997.032536356	997.317982662
^{1}H^{2}H^{16}O	19.01684144	0.328000097	0.187668379
^{2}H_{2}^{16}O	20.02311819	0.000026900	0.000008804
^{1}H_{2}^{17}O	19.01478127	0.411509070	0.388988825
^{1}H^{2}H^{17}O	20.02105801	0.000134998	0.000072993
^{2}H_{2}^{17}O	21.02733476	0.000000011	0.000000003
^{1}H_{2}^{18}O	20.01481037	2.227063738	2.104884332
^{1}H^{2}H^{18}O	21.02108711	0.000728769	0.000393984
^{2}H_{2}^{18}O	22.02736386	0.000000059	0.000000018

According to the table above, the weight concentration of heavy isotopologues in natural water can reach 2.97 g/kg, which is mostly due to ^{1}H_{2}^{18}O, i.e. water with light hydrogen and heavy oxygen. Also, there are ~300 mg of deuterium-containing isotopologues per liter of water. This presents a significant value comparable, for example, with the content of mineral salts.

== Biological properties of the deuterium content in water ==
Gilbert N. Lewis was the first to discover that heavy water inhibits (retards) seed growth (1933). His experiments with tobacco seeds showed that cultivation of cells on heavy water dramatically accelerates the aging process and leads to lethal results.

== Production ==
Deuterium-depleted water can be produced in laboratories and factories. Various technologies are used for its production, such as electrolysis, distillation (low-temperature vacuum rectification), desalination from seawater, Girdler sulfide process, and catalytic exchange.

== Health claims and criticism ==
Harriet Hall investigated health claims being attributed to drinking DDW, which has been sold for as much as $20 per liter. In a July 2020 article published at Skeptical Inquirer online, she reported that the overwhelming majority of DDW studies, despite showing positive outcomes, did not involve humans, and the few that did, did not verify any human efficacy.

== See also ==
- Kinetic isotope effect
- Light water (disambiguation)
- Properties of water
