= Heavy water =

Deuterium oxide

Spacefill model of heavy water

Names
- IUPAC name (^{2}H_{2})Water
- Other names: Deuterium oxide; Water-d_{2}; Dideuterium monoxide; Deuterated water

Identifiers
CAS Number	7789-20-0
3D model (JSmol)	Interactive image
ChEBI	CHEBI:41981
ChEMBL	ChEMBL1232306
ChemSpider	23004
ECHA InfoCard	100.029.226
EC Number	232-148-9
Gmelin Reference	97
KEGG	D03703
MeSH	Deuterium+Oxide
PubChem CID	24602
RTECS number	ZC0230000
UNII	J65BV539M3
CompTox Dashboard (EPA)	DTXSID4051243
- InChI: InChI=1S/H2O/h1H2/i/hD2 Key: XLYOFNOQVPJJNP-ZSJDYOACSA-N
- SMILES: [2H]O[2H]

Properties
Chemical formula	D_{2}O
Molar mass	20.0276 g·mol^{−1}
Appearance	Colorless liquid
Odor	Odorless
Density	1.107 g mL^{−1}
Melting point	3.82 °C; 38.88 °F; 276.97 K
Boiling point	101.4 °C (214.5 °F; 374.5 K)
Solubility in water	Miscible
log P	−1.38
Refractive index (n_{D})	1.328
Viscosity	1.25 mPa s (at 20 °C)
Dipole moment	1.87 D

Hazards
NFPA 704 (fire diamond)	1 0 0

Related compounds
Related compounds	Deuterium fluoride; Nitrogen trideuteride; Tetradeuteromethane
- Except where otherwise noted, data are given for materials in their standard state (at 25 °C [77 °F], 100 kPa). (what is ?) Infobox references

Heavy water (deuterium oxide, ^{2}H_{2}O, D_{2}O) is a form of water in which all hydrogen atoms are hydrogen-2 isotope or deuterium (^{2}H or D, also known as heavy hydrogen) rather than the common hydrogen-1 isotope (^{1}H, also called protium) that makes up most of the hydrogen in normal water. The presence of the heavier isotope gives the water different nuclear properties, and the increase in mass gives it slightly different physical and chemical properties when compared with normal water.

Deuterium is a heavy hydrogen isotope. Heavy water contains deuterium atoms and is used in nuclear reactors. Semiheavy water (HDO) is more common than pure heavy water, while heavy-oxygen water is denser but lacks unique properties. Tritiated water is radioactive because of tritium content.

Heavy water has different physical properties from regular water, such as being 10.6% denser and having a higher melting point. Heavy water is less dissociated at a given temperature, and it does not have the slightly blue color of regular water. It can taste slightly sweeter than regular water, though not to a significant degree. Heavy water affects biological systems by altering enzymes, hydrogen bonds, and cell division in eukaryotes. It can be lethal to multicellular organisms at concentrations over 50%. However, some prokaryotes like bacteria can survive in a heavy hydrogen environment. Heavy water can be toxic to humans, but a large amount would be needed for poisoning to occur – which begin to appear only when deuterium content of body fluids exceeds 20%.

The most cost-effective process for producing heavy water is the Girdler sulfide process. Heavy water is used in various industries and is sold in different grades of purity. Some of its applications include nuclear magnetic resonance, infrared spectroscopy, neutron moderation, neutrino detection, metabolic rate testing, neutron capture therapy, and the production of radioactive materials such as plutonium and tritium.

== Composition ==
The deuterium nucleus consists of a neutron and a proton; the nucleus of a protium (normal hydrogen) atom consists of just a proton. The additional neutron makes a deuterium atom roughly twice as heavy as a protium atom.

A molecule of heavy water has two deuterium atoms in place of the two protium atoms of ordinary water. The term heavy water as defined by the IUPAC Gold Book can also refer to water in which a higher than usual proportion of hydrogen atoms are deuterium. For comparison, Vienna Standard Mean Ocean Water (the "ordinary water" used for a deuterium standard) contains about 156 deuterium atoms per million hydrogen atoms; that is, 0.0156% of the hydrogen atoms are ^{2}H. Thus heavy water as defined by the Gold Book includes semiheavy water (hydrogen-deuterium oxide, HDO) and other mixtures of D_{2}O, H_{2}O, and HDO in which the proportion of deuterium is greater than usual. For instance, the heavy water used in CANDU reactors is a highly enriched water mixture that is mostly deuterium oxide D_{2}O, but also some hydrogen-deuterium oxide and a smaller amount of ordinary water H_{2}O. It is 99.75% enriched by hydrogen atom-fraction; that is, 99.75% of the hydrogen atoms are of the heavy type; however, heavy water in the Gold Book sense need not be so highly enriched. The weight of a heavy water molecule, however, is not very different from that of a normal water molecule, because about 89% of the mass of the molecule comes from the single oxygen atom rather than the two hydrogen atoms.

Heavy water is not radioactive. In its pure form, it has a density about 11% greater than water but is otherwise physically and chemically similar. Nevertheless, the various differences in deuterium-containing water (especially affecting the biological properties) are larger than in any other commonly occurring isotope-substituted compound because deuterium is unique among heavy stable isotopes in being twice as heavy as the lightest isotope. This difference increases the strength of water's hydrogen–oxygen bonds, and this in turn is enough to cause differences that are important to some biochemical reactions. The human body naturally contains deuterium equivalent to about five grams of heavy water, which is harmless. When a large fraction of water (> 50%) in higher organisms is replaced by heavy water, the result is cell dysfunction and death.

Heavy water was first produced in 1932, a few months after the discovery of deuterium. With the discovery of nuclear fission in late 1938, and the need for a neutron moderator that captured few neutrons, heavy water became a component of early nuclear energy research. Since then, heavy water has been an essential component in some types of reactors, both those that generate power and those designed to produce isotopes for nuclear weapons. These heavy water reactors have the advantage of being able to run on natural uranium without using graphite moderators that pose radiological and dust explosion hazards in the decommissioning phase. The graphite moderated Soviet RBMK design tried to avoid using either enriched uranium or heavy water (being cooled with ordinary water instead) which produced the positive void coefficient that was one of a series of flaws in reactor design leading to the Chernobyl disaster. Most modern reactors use enriched uranium with ordinary water as the moderator.

== Other heavy forms of water ==
=== Semiheavy water ===
Structure of semiheavy water

Semiheavy water, HDO, exists whenever there is water with light hydrogen (protium, ^{1}H) and deuterium (D or ^{2}H) in the mix. This is because hydrogen atoms (^{1}H and ^{2}H) are rapidly exchanged between water molecules. Water containing 50% ^{1}H and 50% ^{2}H in its hydrogen, is actually about 50% HDO and 25% each of H_{2}O and D_{2}O, in dynamic equilibrium. In normal water, about 1 molecule in 3,200 is HDO (one hydrogen in 6,400 is ^{2}H), and heavy water molecules (D_{2}O) only occur in a proportion of about 1 molecule in 41 million (i.e. one in 6,400^{2}). Thus semiheavy water molecules are far more common than "pure" (homoisotopic) heavy water molecules.

=== Heavy-oxygen water ===
Water enriched in the heavier oxygen isotopes ^{17}O and ^{18}O is also commercially available. It is "heavy water" as it is denser than normal water (H_{2}^{18}O is approximately as dense as D_{2}O, H_{2}^{17}O is about halfway between H_{2}O and D_{2}O)—but is rarely called heavy water, since it does not contain the excess deuterium that gives D_{2}O its unusual nuclear and biological properties. It is more expensive than D_{2}O due to the more difficult separation of ^{17}O and ^{18}O. H_{2}^{18}O is also used for production of fluorine-18 in radiopharmaceuticals and radiotracers, and positron emission tomography. Small amounts of ^{17}O and ^{18}O are naturally present in water, and most processes enriching heavy water also enrich heavier isotopes of oxygen as a side-effect. This is undesirable if the heavy water is to be used as a neutron moderator in nuclear reactors, as ^{17}O can undergo neutron capture, followed by emission of an alpha particle, producing radioactive ^{14}C. However, doubly labeled water, containing both a heavy oxygen and hydrogen, is useful as a non-radioactive isotopic tracer.

Compared to the isotopic change of hydrogen atoms, the isotopic change of oxygen has a smaller effect on the physical properties.

=== Tritiated water ===
Tritiated water contains tritium (^{3}H) in place of protium (^{1}H) or deuterium (^{2}H). Since tritium is radioactive, tritiated water is also radioactive.

== Physical properties ==
Physical properties of isotopologues of water
Property	D_{2}O (Heavy water)	HDO (Semiheavy water)	H_{2}O (Light water)	T_{2}O (Tritiated water)
Melting point (standard pressure)	3.82 °C (38.88 °F; 276.97 K)	2.04 °C (35.67 °F; 275.19 K)	0.0 °C (32.0 °F; 273.1 K)	4.49 °C (40.08 °F; 277.64 K)
Boiling point	101.4 °C (214.5 °F; 374.5 K)	100.7 °C (213.3 °F; 373.8 K)	100.0 °C (212.0 °F; 373.1 K)	101.5 °C (214.7 °F; 374.6 K)
Density at STP (g/mL)	1.1056	1.054	0.9982	1.2133
Temp. of maximum density	11.6 °C (52.9 °F)	Unverified	3.98 °C (39.16 °F)	13.4 °C (56.1 °F)
Dynamic viscosity (at 20 °C, mPa·s)	1.2467	1.1248	1.0016	1.40 (estimated)
Surface tension (at 25 °C, N/m)	0.07187	0.07193	0.07198	Unverified
Heat of fusion (kJ/mol)	6.132	6.227	6.00678	Unverified
Heat of vaporisation (kJ/mol)	41.521	Unverified	40.657	Unverified
pH (at 25 °C)	7.44 ("pD")	7.266 ("pHD")	7.0	Unverified
pK_{b} (at 25 °C)	7.44 ("pK_{b} D_{2}O")	Unverified	7.0	Unverified
Refractive index (at 20 °C, 0.5893 μm)	1.32844	Unverified	1.33335	Unverified

The physical properties of water and heavy water differ in several respects. Heavy water is less dissociated than light water at given temperature, and the true concentration of D^{+} ions is less than H^{+} ions would be for light water at the same temperature. The same is true of OD^{−} vs. OH^{−} ions. For heavy water Kw D_{2}O (25.0 °C) = 1.35 × 10^{−15}, and [D^{+} ] must equal [OD^{−} ] for neutral water. Thus pKw D_{2}O = p[OD^{−}] + p[D^{+}] = 7.44 + 7.44 = 14.87 (25.0 °C), and the p[D^{+}] of neutral heavy water at 25.0 °C is 7.44.

The pD of heavy water is generally measured using pH electrodes giving a pH (apparent) value, or pHa, and at various temperatures a true acidic pD can be estimated from the directly pH meter measured pHa, such that pD+ = pHa (apparent reading from pH meter) + 0.41. The electrode correction for alkaline conditions is 0.456 for heavy water. The alkaline correction is then pD+ = pH_{a}(apparent reading from pH meter) + 0.456. These corrections are slightly different from previous the differences in p[D+] and p[OD-] of 0.44 from the corresponding ones in heavy water.

Heavy water is 10.6% denser than ordinary water, and heavy water's physically different properties can be seen without equipment if a frozen sample is dropped into normal water, as it will sink. If the water is ice-cold the higher melting temperature of heavy ice can also be observed: it melts at 3.7 °C, and thus does not melt in ice-cold normal water.

A 1935 experiment reported not the "slightest difference" in taste between ordinary and heavy water. However, a more recent study confirmed anecdotal observation that heavy water tastes slightly sweet to humans, with the effect mediated by the TAS1R2/TAS1R3 taste receptor. Rats given a choice between distilled normal water and heavy water were able to avoid the heavy water based on smell, and it may have a different taste. Some people report that minerals in water affect taste, e.g. potassium lending a sweet taste to hard water, but there are many factors of a perceived taste in water besides mineral contents.

Heavy water lacks the characteristic blue color of light water; this is because the molecular vibration harmonics, which in light water cause weak absorption in the red part of the visible spectrum, are shifted into the infrared and thus heavy water does not absorb red light.

No physical properties are listed for "pure" semi-heavy water because it is unstable as a bulk liquid. In the liquid state, a few water molecules are always in an ionized state, which means the hydrogen atoms can exchange among different oxygen atoms. Semi-heavy water could, in theory, be created via a chemical method, but it would rapidly transform into a dynamic mixture of 25% light water, 25% heavy water, and 50% semi-heavy. However, if it were made in the gas phase and directly deposited into a solid, semi-heavy water in the form of ice could be stable. This is due to collisions between water vapor molecules being almost completely negligible in the gas phase at standard temperatures, and once crystallized, collisions between the molecules cease altogether due to the rigid lattice structure of solid ice.

Heavy water exchanges with atmospheric water until it reaches the usual hydrogen-isotopic ratio.

== History ==
The US scientist and Nobel laureate Harold Urey discovered the isotope deuterium in 1931 and was later able to concentrate it in water. Urey's mentor Gilbert Newton Lewis isolated the first sample of pure heavy water by electrolysis in 1933. George de Hevesy and Erich Hofer used heavy water in 1934 in one of the first biological tracer experiments, to estimate the rate of turnover of water in the human body.

Emilian Bratu and Otto Redlich studied the autodissociation of heavy water in 1934.

In the 1930s, it was suspected by the United States and Soviet Union that Austrian chemist Fritz Johann Hansgirg built a pilot plant for the Empire of Japan in Japanese ruled northern Korea to produce heavy water by using a new process he had invented.

During the second World War, the company Fosfatbolaget in Ljungaverk, Sweden, produced 2,300 liters per year of heavy water. The heavy water was then sold to Germany for the price of 1.40 SEK per gram of heavy water.

In October 1939, Soviet physicists Yakov Borisovich Zel'dovich and Yulii Borisovich Khariton concluded that heavy water and carbon were the only feasible moderators for a natural uranium reactor, and in August 1940, along with Georgy Flyorov, submitted a plan to the Russian Academy of Sciences calculating that 15 tons of heavy water were needed for a reactor. With the Soviet Union having no uranium mines at the time, young Academy workers were sent to Leningrad photographic shops to buy uranium nitrate, but the entire heavy water project was halted in 1941 when German forces invaded during Operation Barbarossa.

By 1943, Soviet scientists had discovered that all scientific literature relating to heavy water had disappeared from the West, which Flyorov in a letter warned Soviet leader Joseph Stalin about, and at which time there were only 2–3 kg of heavy water in the entire country. In late 1943, the Soviet purchasing commission in the U.S. obtained 1 kg of heavy water and a further 100 kg in February 1945, and upon World War II ending, the NKVD took over the project.

In October 1946, as part of the Russian Alsos, the NKVD deported to the Soviet Union from Germany the German scientists who had worked on heavy water production during the war, including Karl-Hermann Geib, the inventor of the Girdler sulfide process. These German scientists worked under the supervision of German physical chemist Max Volmer at the Institute of Physical Chemistry in Moscow with the plant they constructed producing large quantities of heavy water by 1948.

== Effect on biological systems ==
Different isotopes of chemical elements have slightly different chemical behaviors, but for most elements the differences are far too small to have a biological effect. In the case of hydrogen, larger differences in chemical properties among protium, deuterium, and tritium occur because chemical bond energy depends on the reduced mass of the nucleus–electron system; this is altered in heavy-hydrogen compounds (hydrogen-deuterium oxide is the most common) more than for heavy-isotope substitution involving other chemical elements. The isotope effects are especially relevant in biological systems, which are very sensitive to even the smaller changes, due to isotopically influenced properties of water when it acts as a solvent.

To perform their tasks, enzymes rely on their finely tuned networks of hydrogen bonds, both in the active center with their substrates and outside the active center, to stabilize their tertiary structures. As a hydrogen bond with deuterium is slightly stronger than one involving ordinary hydrogen, in a highly deuterated environment, some normal reactions in cells are disrupted.

Particularly hard-hit by heavy water are the delicate assemblies of mitotic spindle formations necessary for cell division in eukaryotes. Plants stop growing and seeds do not germinate when given only heavy water, because heavy water stops eukaryotic cell division. Tobacco does not germinate, but wheat does. The deuterium cell is larger and is a modification of the direction of division. The cell membrane also changes, and it reacts first to the impact of heavy water. In 1972, it was demonstrated that an increase in the percentage of deuterium in water reduces plant growth. Research conducted on the growth of prokaryote microorganisms in artificial conditions of a heavy hydrogen environment showed that in this environment, all the hydrogen atoms of water could be replaced with deuterium. Experiments showed that bacteria can live in 98% heavy water. Concentrations over 50% are lethal to multicellular organisms, but a few exceptions are known: plant species such as switchgrass (Panicum virgatum) which is able to grow on 50% D_{2}O; Arabidopsis thaliana (70% D_{2}O); Vesicularia dubyana (85% D_{2}O); Funaria hygrometrica (90% D_{2}O); and the anhydrobiotic species of nematode Panagrolaimus superbus (nearly 100% D_{2}O).

A comprehensive study of heavy water on the fission yeast Schizosaccharomyces pombe showed that the cells displayed an altered glucose metabolism and slow growth at high concentrations of heavy water. In addition, the cells activated the heat-shock response pathway and the cell integrity pathway, and mutants in the cell integrity pathway displayed increased tolerance to heavy water. Despite its toxicity at high levels, heavy water has been observed to extend lifespan of certain yeasts by up to 85%, with the hypothesized mechanism being the reduction of reactive oxygen species turnover.

Heavy water affects the period of circadian oscillations, consistently increasing the length of each cycle. The effect has been demonstrated in unicellular organisms, green plants, isopods, insects, birds, mice, and hamsters. The mechanism is unknown.

Like ethanol, heavy water temporarily changes the relative density of cupula relative to the endolymph in the vestibular organ, causing positional nystagmus, illusions of bodily rotations, dizziness, and nausea. However, the direction of nystagmus is in the opposite direction of ethanol, since it is denser than water, not lighter.

=== Effect on animals ===
Experiments with mice, rats, and dogs have shown that a degree of 25% deuteration prevents gametes or zygotes from developing, causing (sometimes irreversible) sterility. High concentrations of heavy water (90%) rapidly kill fish, tadpoles, flatworms, and Drosophila. Mice raised from birth with 30% heavy water have 25% deuteration in body fluid and 10% in brains. They are normal except for sterility. Deuteration during pregnancy induces fetal abnormality. Higher deuteration in body fluid causes death. Mammals (for example, rats) given heavy water to drink die after a week, at a time when their body water approaches about 50% deuteration. The mode of death appears to be the same as that in cytotoxic poisoning (such as chemotherapy) or in acute radiation syndrome (though deuterium is not radioactive), and is caused by deuterium's action in generally inhibiting cell division. It is more toxic to malignant cells than normal cells, but the concentrations needed are too high for regular use. As may occur in chemotherapy, deuterium-poisoned mammals die of a failure of bone marrow (producing bleeding and infections) and of intestinal-barrier functions (producing diarrhea and loss of fluids).

Despite the problems of plants and animals in living with too much deuterium, prokaryotic organisms such as bacteria, which do not have the mitotic problems induced by deuterium, may be grown and propagated in fully deuterated conditions, resulting in replacement of all hydrogen atoms in the bacterial proteins and DNA with the deuterium isotope. This leads to a process of bootstrapping. With prokaryotes producing fully deuterated glucose, fully deuterated Escherichia coli and Torula were raised, and they could produce even more complex fully deuterated chemicals. Molds like Aspergillus could not replicate under fully deuterated conditions.

In higher organisms, full replacement with heavy isotopes can be accomplished with other non-radioactive heavy isotopes (such as carbon-13, nitrogen-15, and oxygen-18), but this cannot be done for deuterium. This is a consequence of the ratio of nuclear masses between the isotopes of hydrogen, which is much greater than for any other element.

Deuterium oxide is used to enhance boron neutron capture therapy, but this effect does not rely on the biological or chemical effects of deuterium, but instead on deuterium's ability to moderate (slow) neutrons without capturing them. 2021 experimental evidence indicates that systemic administration of deuterium oxide (30% drinking water supplementation) suppresses tumor growth in a standard mouse model of human melanoma, an effect attributed to selective induction of cellular stress signaling and gene expression in tumor cells. In 1983, a comparative study showed that a degree of 30% deuteration on mice could lower the mortality of the deuterated group compared to the control group after a whole-body gamma irradiation.

=== Toxicity in humans ===
Since it would take an elevated amount of heavy water to replace 25% to 50% of a human being's body water (water being in turn 50–75% of body weight) with heavy water, accidental or intentional poisoning with heavy water is unlikely to the point of practical disregard. Poisoning would require that the victim ingest large amounts of heavy water without significant normal water intake for many days to produce any noticeable toxic effects.

Oral doses of heavy water in the range of several grams, as well as heavy oxygen ^{18}O, are routinely used in human metabolic experiments. One experiment involving humans given 140–250g heavy water, corresponding to 0.5% of total body water, showed only temporary symptoms such as vertigo, while another experiment where humans were given boluses of heavy water amounting to 0.4 to 0.8% within body water showed no side effects. (See also doubly labeled water testing.) Since one in about every 6,400 hydrogen atoms is deuterium, a 50-kilogram (110 lb) human containing 32 kilograms (71 lb) of body water would normally contain enough deuterium (about 1.1 grams or 0.039 ounces) to make 5.5 grams (0.19 oz) of pure heavy water, so roughly this dose is required to double the amount of deuterium in the body.

A loss of blood pressure may partially explain the reported incidence of dizziness upon ingestion of heavy water. However, it is more likely that this symptom can be attributed to altered vestibular function. Heavy water, like ethanol, causes a temporary difference in the density of endolymph within the cupula, which confuses the vestibulo-ocular reflex and causes motion sickness symptoms.

=== Heavy water radiation contamination confusion ===
Although many people associate heavy water primarily with its use in nuclear reactors, pure heavy water is not radioactive. Commercial-grade heavy water is slightly radioactive due to the presence of minute traces of natural tritium, but the same is true of ordinary water. Heavy water that has been used as a coolant in nuclear power plants contains substantially more tritium as a result of neutron bombardment of the deuterium in the heavy water (tritium is a health risk when ingested in large quantities).

In 1990, an employee at the Point Lepreau Nuclear Generating Station in Canada obtained a sample (estimated as about a "half cup") of heavy water from the primary heat transport loop of the nuclear reactor, and loaded it into a cafeteria drink dispenser. Eight employees drank some of the contaminated water. The incident was discovered when employees began leaving bioassay urine samples with elevated tritium levels. The quantity of heavy water involved was far below levels that could induce heavy water toxicity, but several employees received elevated radiation doses from tritium and neutron-activated chemicals in the water.

Some news services were not careful to distinguish these points, and some of the public were left with the impression that heavy water is normally radioactive and more severely toxic than it actually is. Even if pure heavy water had been used in the water dispenser indefinitely, it is not likely the incident would have been detected or caused harm, since no employee would be expected to get much more than 25% of their daily drinking water from such a source.

== Production methods ==
The most cost-effective process for producing heavy water is the Girdler sulfide process, a dual-temperature reactor system developed in parallel by Karl-Hermann Geib and Jerome S. Spevack in 1943.

As noted, modern commercial heavy water is almost universally referred to, and sold as, deuterium oxide. It is most often sold in various grades of purity, from 98% enrichment to 99.75–99.98% deuterium enrichment (nuclear reactor grade) and occasionally even higher isotopic purity.

Methods of heavy water production
Method type	First plant	Date	Feedstock	Dual temperature	Temperature (K)	Separation coefficient	Energy consumption (MWh/kg)
Electrolysis	Vemork, Norway	1934	H_{2}O		360–370	5–7	120–150
Rectification	Morgantown Ordnance Works, United States	1943	H_{2}O		353–373	1.043–1.026	40
Rectification	Norilsk, Soviet Union	1955	NH_{3}		283–293	1.024–1.020	8
Rectification	?, Soviet Union	1958	H_{2}		22–23	1.47–1.52	4–5
Chemical isotope exchange			H_{2}-NH_{3}		248	5.3	3.0
Chemical isotope exchange			H_{2}-H_{2}O		333	3.14	65–70
Chemical isotope exchange	Aleksin, Soviet Union	1947	H_{2}S-H_{2}O	T_{1}	303	2.34	2.8
Chemical isotope exchange	Aleksin, Soviet Union	1947	H_{2}S-H_{2}O	T_{2}	403	1.82	2.8
Chemical isotope exchange			H_{2}-H_{2}O	T_{1}	223	7.9	1.0
Chemical isotope exchange			H_{2}-H_{2}O	T_{2}	313	3.6	1.0
Chemical isotope exchange			H_{2}-NH_{3}	T_{1}	248	5.3	1.0
Chemical isotope exchange			H_{2}-NH_{3}	T_{2}	333	2.9	1.0
Laser dissociation	None		CHF_{3}		323–353		

== Production by country ==
=== Argentina ===
Argentina was the main producer of heavy water, using an ammonia/hydrogen exchange based plant supplied by Switzerland's Sulzer company. It was also a major exporter to Canada, Germany, the US and other countries. The heavy water production facility located in Arroyito was the world's largest heavy water production facility. Argentina produced 200 short tons (180 tonnes) of heavy water per year in 2015 using the monothermal ammonia-hydrogen isotopic exchange method. Since 2017, the Arroyito plant has not been operational.

=== United States ===
During the Manhattan Project the United States constructed three heavy water production plants as part of the P-9 Project at Morgantown Ordnance Works, near Morgantown, West Virginia; at the Wabash River Ordnance Works, near Dana and Newport, Indiana; and at the Alabama Ordnance Works, near Childersburg and Sylacauga, Alabama. Heavy water was also acquired from the Cominco plant in Trail, British Columbia, Canada. The Chicago Pile-3 experimental reactor used heavy water as a moderator and went critical in 1944. The three domestic production plants were shut down in 1945 after producing around 81,470 lb (36,950 kg) of product. The Wabash plant resumed heavy water production in 1952.

In 1953, the United States began using heavy water in plutonium production reactors at the Savannah River Site. The first of the five heavy water reactors came online in 1953, and the last was placed in cold shutdown in 1996. The reactors were heavy water reactors so that they could produce both plutonium and tritium for the US nuclear weapons program.

The U.S. developed the Girdler sulfide chemical exchange production process—which was first demonstrated on a large scale at the Dana, Indiana plant in 1945 and at the Savannah River Site in 1952.

=== India ===
India is the world's largest producer of heavy water through its Heavy Water Board. It exports heavy water to countries including the Republic of Korea, China, and the United States.

=== Norway ===
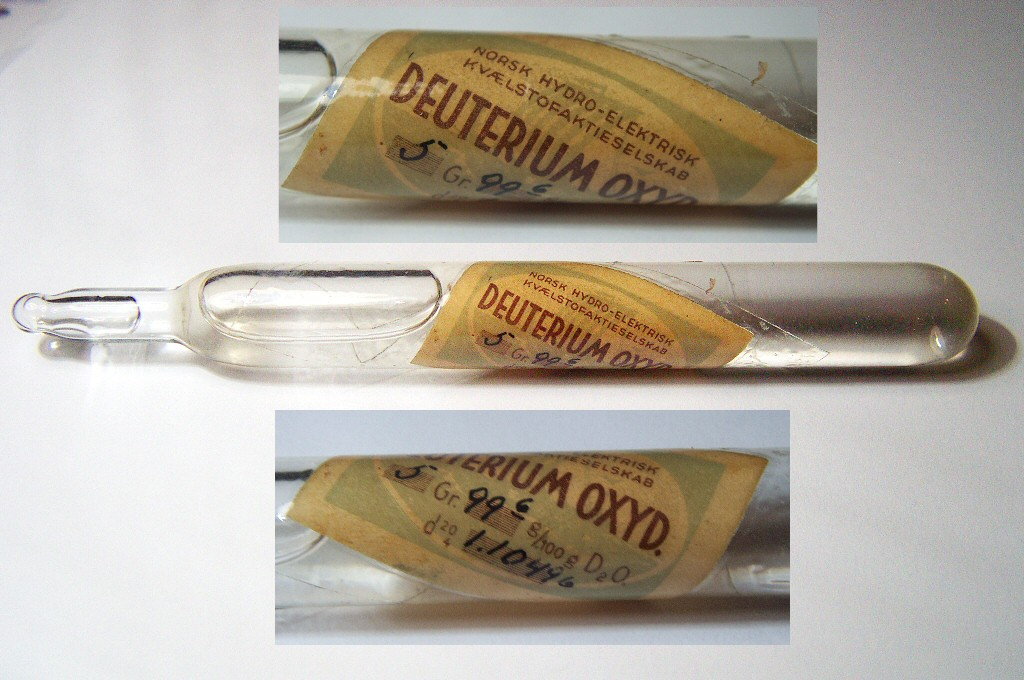
"Heavy water" made by Norsk Hydro

In 1934, Norsk Hydro built the first commercial heavy water plant at Vemork, Tinn Municipality, eventually producing 4 kilograms (8.8 lb) per day. From 1940 and throughout World War II, the plant was under German control, and the Allies decided to destroy the plant and its heavy water to inhibit German development of nuclear weapons. In late 1942, a planned raid called Operation Freshman by British airborne troops failed, with both gliders crashing. The raiders were killed in the crash or subsequently executed by the Germans.

On the night of 27 February 1943 Operation Gunnerside succeeded. Norwegian commandos and local resistance managed to demolish small, but key parts of the electrolytic cells, dumping the accumulated heavy water down the factory drains.

On 16 November 1943, the Allied air forces dropped more than 400 bombs on the site. The Allied air raid prompted the Nazi government to move all available heavy water to Germany for safekeeping. On 20 February 1944, a Norwegian partisan sank the ferry M/F Hydro carrying heavy water across Lake Tinn, at the cost of 14 Norwegian civilian lives, and most of the heavy water was presumably lost. A few of the barrels were only half full, hence buoyant, and may have been salvaged and transported to Germany.

Recent investigation of production records at Norsk Hydro and analysis of an intact barrel that was salvaged in 2004 revealed that although the barrels in this shipment contained water of pH 14—indicative of the alkaline electrolytic refinement process—they did not contain high concentrations of D_{2}O. Despite the apparent size of the shipment, the total quantity of pure heavy water was quite small, most barrels only containing 0.5–1% pure heavy water. The Germans would have needed about 5 tons of heavy water to get a nuclear reactor running. The manifest clearly indicated that there was only half a ton of heavy water being transported to Germany. Hydro was carrying far too little heavy water for one reactor, let alone the 10 or more tons needed to make enough plutonium for a nuclear weapon. The German nuclear weapons program was much less advanced than the Manhattan Project, and no reactor constructed in Nazi Germany came close to reaching criticality. No amount of heavy water would have changed that.

Israel admitted running the Dimona reactor with Norwegian heavy water sold to it in 1959. Through re-export using Romania and Germany, India probably also used Norwegian heavy water.

=== Canada ===
As part of its contribution to the Manhattan Project, Canada built and operated a 1,000 to 1,200 pounds (450 to 540 kg) per month (design capacity) electrolytic heavy water plant at Trail, British Columbia, which started operation in 1943.

The Atomic Energy of Canada Limited (AECL) design of power reactor requires large quantities of heavy water to act as a neutron moderator and coolant. AECL ordered two heavy water plants, which were built and operated in Atlantic Canada at Glace Bay, Nova Scotia (by Deuterium of Canada Limited) and Point Tupper, Richmond County, Nova Scotia (by Canadian General Electric). These plants proved to have significant design, construction and production problems. The Glace Bay plant reached full production in 1984 after being taken over by AECL in 1971. The Point Tupper plant reached full production in 1974 and AECL purchased the plant in 1975. Design changes from the Point Tupper plant were carried through as AECL built the Bruce Heavy Water Plant (44.1854°N 81.3618°W), which it later sold to Ontario Hydro, to ensure a reliable supply of heavy water for future power plants. The two Nova Scotia plants were shut down in 1985 when their production proved unnecessary.

The Bruce Heavy Water Plant (BHWP) in Ontario was the world's largest heavy water production plant with a capacity of 1600 tonnes per year at its peak (800 tonnes per year per full plant, two fully operational plants at its peak). It used the Girdler sulfide process to produce heavy water, and required 340,000 tonnes of feed water to produce one tonne of heavy water. It was part of a complex that included eight CANDU reactors, which provided heat and power for the heavy water plant. The site was located at Douglas Point/Bruce Nuclear Generating Station near Tiverton, Ontario, on Lake Huron where it had access to the waters of the Great Lakes.

AECL issued the construction contract in 1969 for the first BHWP unit (BHWP A). Commissioning of BHWP A was done by Ontario Hydro from 1971 through 1973, with the plant entering service on 28 June 1973, and design production capacity being achieved in April 1974. Due to the success of BHWP A and the large amount of heavy water that would be required for the large numbers of upcoming planned CANDU nuclear power plant construction projects, Ontario Hydro commissioned three additional heavy water production plants for the Bruce site (BHWP B, C, and D). BHWP B was placed into service in 1979. These first two plants were significantly more efficient than planned, and the number of CANDU construction projects ended up being significantly lower than originally planned, which led to the cancellation of construction on BHWP C & D. In 1984, BHWP A was shut down. By 1993 Ontario Hydro had produced enough heavy water to meet all of its anticipated domestic needs (which were lower than expected due to improved efficiency in the use and recycling of heavy water), so they shut down and demolished half of the capacity of BHWP B. The remaining capacity continued to operate in order to fulfil demand for heavy water exports until it was permanently shut down in 1997, after which the plant was gradually dismantled and the site cleared.

Heavy water represented about 15–20% of the total capital cost of each CANDU reactor in the 1970s and 1980s.

=== Iran ===
Since 1996 a plant (IR-40) for production of heavy water was being constructed at Khondab near Arak. On 26 August 2006, Iranian President Ahmadinejad inaugurated the expansion of the country's heavy-water plant. Iran has indicated that the heavy-water production facility will operate in tandem with a 40 MW research reactor that had a scheduled completion date in 2009. Iran produced deuterated solvents in early 2011 for the first time. The core of the IR-40 is supposed to be re-designed based on the nuclear agreement in July 2015.

Under the Joint Comprehensive Plan of Action, Iran is permitted to store only 130 tonnes (140 short tons) of heavy water. Iran exports excess production, making Iran the world's third largest exporter of heavy water.

In 2015, per the JCOP and understanding with the IAEA, Iran reported that the IR-40 was unusable but it was reported in 2019 that the pictures of the pouring of concrete into the reactor's pit were photoshopped and plant was never made unusable but remained operational that Iran had purchased spares through blackmarket to replace the core.

In 2025, Israel and the United States reportedly targeted the IR-40. In 2026, the IR-40 was again targetd in subsequent strikes by the Israeli Air Force.

=== Pakistan ===
In Pakistan, there are two heavy water production sites that are based in Punjab. Commissioned in 1995–96, the Khushab Nuclear Complex is a central element of Pakistan's stockpile program for production of weapon-grade plutonium, deuterium, and tritium for advanced compact warheads (i.e. thermonuclear weapons). Another heavy water facility for producing the heavy water is located in Multan, that it sells to nuclear power plants in Karachi and Chashma.

In early 1980s, Pakistan succeeded in acquiring a tritium purification and storage plant and deuterium and tritium precursor materials from two East German firms. Unlike India and Iran, the heavy water produced by Pakistan is not exported nor available for purchase to any nation and is solely used for its weapons complex and energy generation at its local nuclear power plants.

=== Other countries ===
Romania produced heavy water at the now-decommissioned Drobeta Girdler sulfide plant for domestic and export purposes. France operated a small plant during the 1950s and 1960s.

== Applications ==
=== Nuclear magnetic resonance ===
Deuterium oxide is used in nuclear magnetic resonance spectroscopy when using water as a solvent if the nuclide of interest is hydrogen. This is because the signal from light-water (^{1}H_{2}O) solvent molecules would overwhelm the signal from the molecule of interest dissolved in it. Deuterium has a different magnetic moment and therefore does not contribute to the ^{1}H-NMR signal at the hydrogen-1 resonance frequency.

For some experiments, it may be desirable to identify the labile hydrogens on a compound, that is hydrogens that can easily exchange away as H^{+} ions on some positions in a molecule. With addition of D_{2}O, sometimes referred to as a D_{2}O shake, labile hydrogens exchange between the compound of interest and the solvent, leading to replacement of those specific ^{1}H atoms in the compound with ^{2}H. These positions in the molecule then do not appear in the ^{1}H-NMR spectrum.

=== Organic chemistry ===
Deuterium oxide is often used as the source of deuterium for preparing specifically labelled isotopologues of organic compounds. For example, C-H bonds adjacent to ketonic carbonyl groups can be replaced by C-D bonds, using acid or base catalysis. Trimethylsulfoxonium iodide, made from dimethyl sulfoxide and methyl iodide can be recrystallized from deuterium oxide, and then dissociated to regenerate methyl iodide and dimethyl sulfoxide, both deuterium labelled. In cases where specific double labelling by deuterium and tritium is contemplated, the researcher must be aware that deuterium oxide, depending upon age and origin, can contain some tritium.

=== Infrared spectroscopy ===
Deuterium oxide is often used instead of water when collecting FTIR spectra of proteins in solution. H_{2}O creates a strong band that overlaps with the amide I region of proteins. The band from D_{2}O is shifted away from the amide I region.

=== Neutron moderator ===
Heavy water is used in certain types of nuclear reactors, where it acts as a neutron moderator to slow down neutrons so that they are more likely to react with the fissile uranium-235 than with uranium-238, which captures neutrons without fissioning. The CANDU reactor uses this design. Light water also acts as a moderator, but because light water absorbs more neutrons than heavy water, reactors using light water for a reactor moderator must use enriched uranium rather than natural uranium, otherwise criticality is impossible. A significant fraction of outdated power reactors, such as the RBMK reactors in the USSR, were constructed using normal water for cooling but graphite as a moderator. However, the danger of graphite in power reactors (graphite fires in part led to the Chernobyl disaster) has led to the discontinuation of graphite in standard reactor designs.

The breeding and extraction of plutonium can be a relatively rapid and cheap route to building a nuclear weapon, as chemical separation of plutonium from fuel is easier than isotopic separation of U-235 from natural uranium. Among current and past nuclear weapons states, Israel, India, and North Korea first used plutonium from heavy water moderated reactors burning natural uranium, while China, South Africa and Pakistan first built weapons using highly enriched uranium.

The Nazi nuclear program, operating with more modest means than the contemporaneous Manhattan Project and hampered by many leading scientists having been driven into exile (many of them ending up working for the Manhattan Project), as well as continuous infighting, wrongly dismissed graphite as a moderator due to not recognizing the effect of impurities. Given that isotope separation of uranium was deemed too big a hurdle, this left heavy water as a potential moderator. Other problems were the ideological aversion regarding what propaganda dismissed as "Jewish physics" and the mistrust between those who had been enthusiastic Nazis even before 1933 and those who were Mitläufer or trying to keep a low profile. In part due to allied sabotage and commando raids on Norsk Hydro (then the world's largest producer of heavy water) as well as the aforementioned infighting, the German nuclear program never managed to assemble enough uranium and heavy water in one place to achieve criticality despite possessing enough of both by the end of the war.

In the U.S., however, the first experimental atomic reactor (1942), as well as the Manhattan Project Hanford production reactors that produced the plutonium for the Trinity test and Fat Man bombs, all used pure carbon (graphite) neutron moderators combined with normal water cooling pipes. They functioned with neither enriched uranium nor heavy water. Russian and British plutonium production also used graphite-moderated reactors.

There is no evidence that civilian heavy water power reactors—such as the CANDU or Atucha designs—have been used to produce military fissile materials. In nations that do not already possess nuclear weapons, nuclear material at these facilities is under IAEA safeguards to discourage any diversion.

Due to its potential for use in nuclear weapons programs, the possession or import/export of large industrial quantities of heavy water are subject to government control in several countries. Suppliers of heavy water and heavy water production technology typically apply IAEA (International Atomic Energy Agency) administered safeguards and material accounting to heavy water. (In Australia, the Nuclear Non-Proliferation (Safeguards) Act 1987.) In the U.S. and Canada, non-industrial quantities of heavy water (i.e., in the gram to kg range) are routinely available without special license through chemical supply dealers and commercial companies such as the world's former major producer Ontario Hydro.

=== Neutrino detector ===
The Sudbury Neutrino Observatory (SNO) in Sudbury, Ontario uses 1,000 tonnes of heavy water on loan from Atomic Energy of Canada Limited. The neutrino detector is 6,800 feet (2,100 m) underground in a mine, to shield it from muons produced by cosmic rays. SNO was built to answer the question of whether or not electron-type neutrinos produced by fusion in the Sun (the only type the Sun should be producing directly, according to theory) might be able to turn into other types of neutrinos on the way to Earth. SNO detects the Cherenkov radiation in the water from high-energy electrons produced from electron-type neutrinos as they undergo charged current (CC) interactions with neutrons in deuterium, turning them into protons and electrons (however, only the electrons are fast enough to produce Cherenkov radiation for detection).

SNO also detects neutrino electron scattering (ES) events, where the neutrino transfers energy to the electron, which then proceeds to generate Cherenkov radiation distinguishable from that produced by CC events. The first of these two reactions is produced only by electron-type neutrinos, while the second can be caused by all of the neutrino flavors. The use of deuterium is critical to the SNO function, because all three "flavours" (types) of neutrinos may be detected in a third type of reaction as well, neutrino-disintegration, in which a neutrino of any type (electron, muon, or tau) scatters from a deuterium nucleus (deuteron), transferring enough energy to break up the loosely bound deuteron into a free neutron and proton via a neutral current (NC) interaction.

This event is detected when the free neutron is absorbed by ^{35}Cl^{−} present from NaCl deliberately dissolved in the heavy water, causing emission of characteristic capture gamma rays. Thus, in this experiment, heavy water not only provides the transparent medium necessary to produce and visualize Cherenkov radiation, but it also provides deuterium to detect exotic mu type (μ) and tau (τ) neutrinos, as well as a non-absorbent moderator medium to preserve free neutrons from this reaction, until they can be absorbed by an easily detected neutron-activated isotope.

=== Metabolic rate and water turnover testing in physiology and biology ===
Heavy water is employed as part of a mixture with H_{2}^{18}O for a common and safe test of mean metabolic rate in humans and animals undergoing their normal activities.The elimination rate of deuterium alone is a measure of body water turnover. This is highly variable between individuals and depends on environmental conditions as well as subject size, sex, age and physical activity.

=== Tritium production ===
Tritium is the active substance in self-powered lighting and controlled nuclear fusion, its other uses including autoradiography and radioactive labeling. It is also used in nuclear weapon design for boosted fission weapons and initiators. Tritium undergoes beta decay into helium-3, which is a stable, but rare, isotope of helium that is itself highly sought after. Some tritium is created in heavy water moderated reactors when deuterium captures a neutron. This reaction has a small cross-section (probability of a single neutron-capture event) and produces only small amounts of tritium, although enough to justify cleaning tritium from the moderator every few years to reduce the environmental risk of tritium escape. Given that helium-3 is a neutron poison with orders of magnitude higher capture cross section than any component of heavy or tritiated water, its accumulation in a heavy water neutron moderator or target for tritium production must be kept to a minimum.

Producing a lot of tritium in this way would require reactors with very high neutron fluxes, or with a very high proportion of heavy water to nuclear fuel and very low neutron absorption by other reactor material. The tritium would then have to be recovered by isotope separation from a much larger quantity of deuterium, unlike production from lithium-6 (the present method), where only chemical separation is needed.

Deuterium's absorption cross section for thermal neutrons is 0.52 millibarn (5.2 × 10^{−32} m^{2}; 1 barn = 10^{−28} m^{2}), while those of oxygen-16 and oxygen-17 are 0.19 and 240 millibarn, respectively. ^{17}O makes up 0.038% of natural oxygen, making the overall cross section 0.28 millibarns. Therefore, in D_{2}O with natural oxygen, 21% of neutron captures are on oxygen, rising higher as ^{17}O builds up from neutron capture on ^{16}O. Also, ^{17}O may emit an alpha particle on neutron capture, producing radioactive carbon-14.

== See also ==
- Deuterium-depleted water
- Interstellar ice
