= Karl-Hermann Geib =

German chemist (1908–1949)

- Born: 12 March 1908; Berlin, Germany
- Died: 21 July 1949 (aged 41); Moscow, Soviet Union
- Education: Leipzig University
- Scientific career
- Fields: Physical chemistry

Karl-Hermann Geib (12 March 1908 – 21 July 1949) was a German physical chemist who, in 1943, developed the "dual temperature exchange sulphide process" (known as the Girdler sulfide process) which is regarded as the "most cost-effective process for producing heavy water". A parallel development of this process was achieved by Jerome S. Spevack at Columbia University

== Early life ==
Geib was born in Berlin, Germany, on 12 March 1908 to Karl Geib and his wife Maria (née Buddee). He married Hedwig Delbrück and they had four children, Katharina Oestreich (1937-2020), Barbara Pietsch (1938–2016), Ruprecht (1939-2026) and Ulrike Heise, born 1940.

In 1931, he graduated from Leipzig University and joined the Institute of Physical Chemistry and Electrochemistry of Kaiser Wilhelm Society, which is known today as the Fritz Haber Institute of the Max Planck Society.

== Work in Germany ==
In 1931, while under the supervision of Paul Harteck, in Berlin, Geib delivered his dissertation on The Action of Atomic to Molecular Hydrogen and joined the Kaiser-Wilhelm Institut für physikalische Chemie und Elektrochemie of the Kaiser-Wilhelm Gesellschaft in Berlin-Dahlem. The first scientific work he performed under the direction of Paul Harteck. Shortly after Harteck highway crossing in Cambridge Geib returned to alma mater – the Leipzig University and married Hedwig Delbrück.

He began exploring the reactions of the newly discovered deuterium. Independently and jointly with V. T. Forster, E. W. R. Steacie, A. Lendl, R. K. F. Bonhoeffer and L. D. C. Bok he published a number of papers, the results of which are reflected in his review.

After the beginning of World War II (1940), Geib went to the chemical industrial complexes Leunawerke and proceeded under the Harteck's direction of the development process production of heavy water by a two-temperature isotopic exchange between hydrogen sulfide and water. So he received reservation on the mobilization, which for him was a significant factor. Karl and Hedwig Geib at the time had four children from infancy to five years.

In 1943, the Norwegian heavy water sabotage caused the production of heavy water to be returned to Germany under the direction of Paul Harteck, whose graduate student, Karl-Hermann Geib, while employed with the German chemical industry conglomerate IG Farben, suggested an exchange that used hydrogen sulfide in the process.

The developed process was more effective than process with exchange in a hydrogen–water system, but its implementation was delayed. To create production capacity due to corrosion of hydrogen sulfide would take a lot of special alloys, which in time of war there was a shortage. Simultaneously developed by Jerome Spevak in the U.S. (1943) the same process did not develop at first for the same reason. Immediately after the war under the auspices of the Soviet Military Administration in Germany and other agencies in the Leunawerke had assembled a group of experts, led by Paul Herold, a former Director on science. Geib joined the group. Pilot plants were restored and study of the process by isotopic exchange between hydrogen and water was continued. Besides the preliminary draft of plant with hydrogen sulfide annual capacity 5 tons of heavy water was designed.

== Deportation to Soviet Union ==
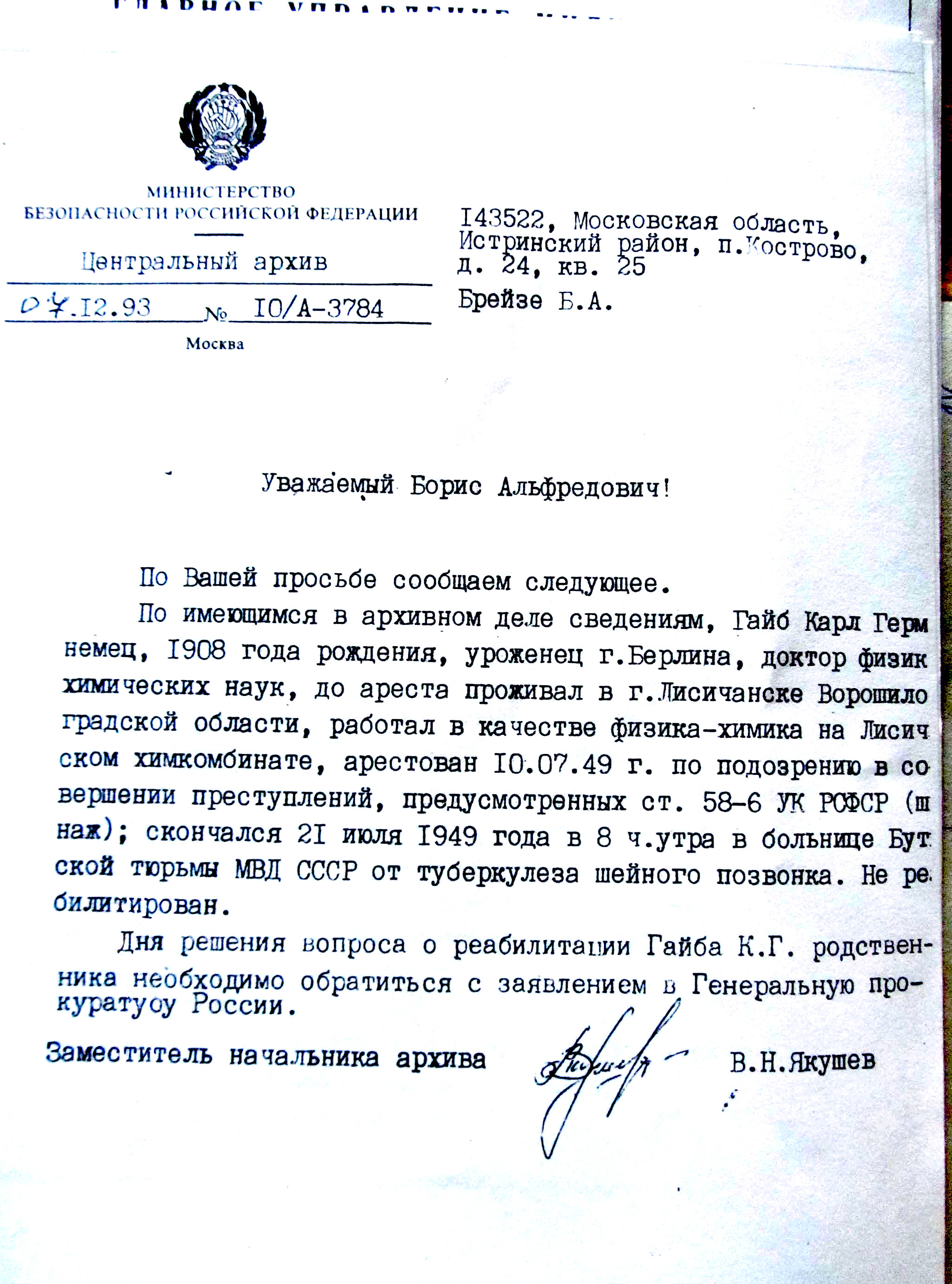
Document from the archive of the Ministry of Security of the Russian Federation concerning Karl-Hermann Geib. The document details where Geib was living and working before his arrest in 1949. It furthermore states the reason for his arrest and his death date, and instructs relatives on how to seek rehabilitation.

At 4:15 a.m. on 21 October 1946, Geib, and all of the other German scientists who had worked on heavy water production during World War II, were rounded up in Leunawerke by the NKVD in "Operation Osoaviakhim" as part of the Russian Alsos and deported to the Soviet Union. They were housed in the town of Babushkin (presently Babushkinsky District of Moscow) and put to work at the Karpov Institute of Physical Chemistry under the leadership of Max Volmer until mid-1948 when they were then sent to Rubizhne in Ukraine.

Scientific work on heavy water and its production in both Nazi Germany and the Soviet Union were conducted in strict secrecy, so many facts remain unclear.

After applying to the Canadian Embassy in Moscow for asylum (exact date classified) giving the name of Professor E. W. R. Steacie as a reference, he was told to come back the next day. That was the last time he was seen and his wife in Germany received his effects in the mail.
