= Kabelwerk Oberspree =

Factory in Treptow-Köpenick, Berlin, Germany

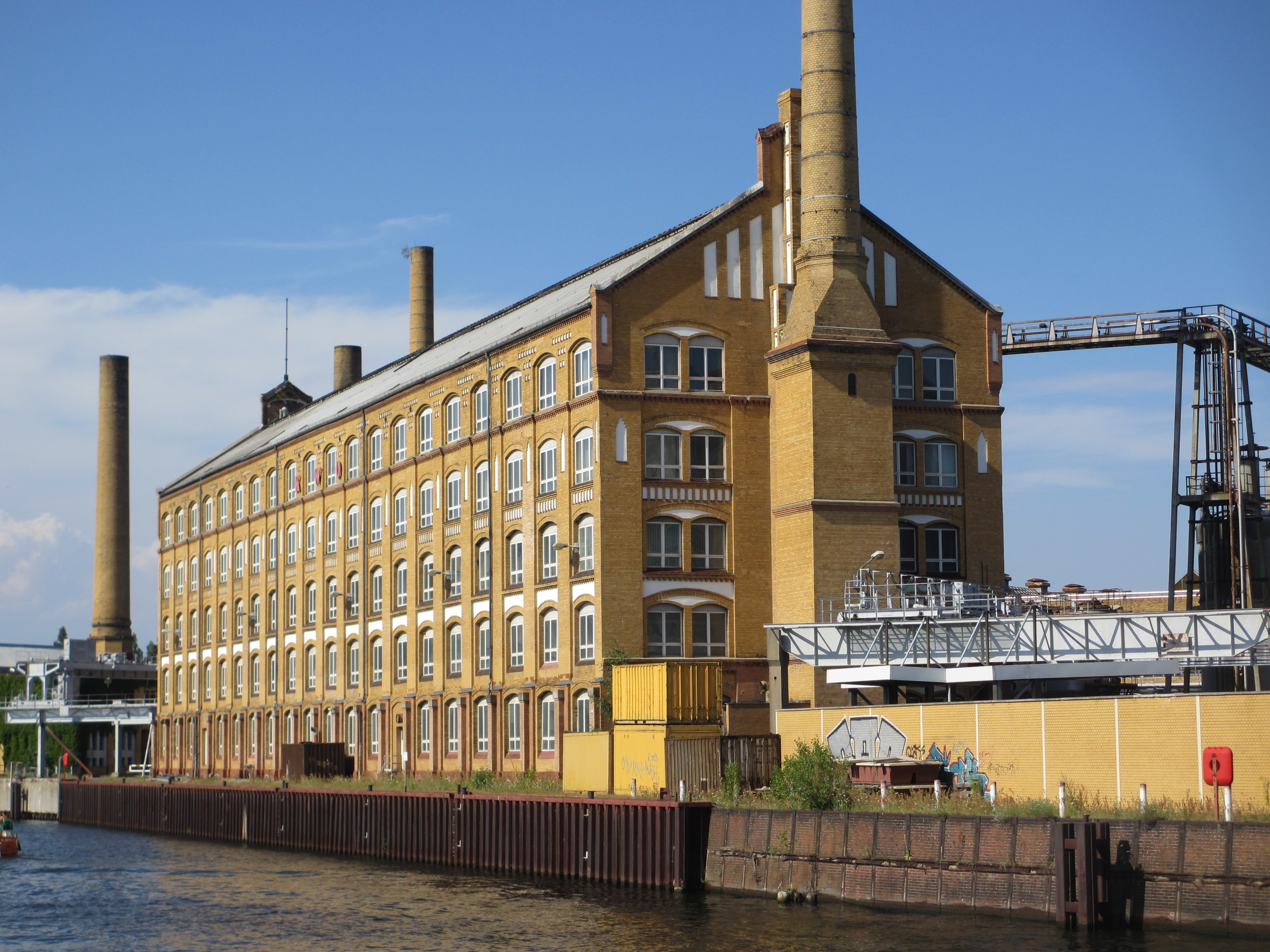

Kabelwerk Oberspree (KWO) was a major German manufacturer of electrical cables and wiring located in Berlin-Oberschöneweide, Germany. Founded by the Allgemeine Elektricitäts-Gesellschaft (AEG) in 1897, it became one of Germany's largest cable production facilities and later the headquarters of the East German cable combine Kombinat VEB Kabelwerk Oberspree during the period of the German Democratic Republic. Following German reunification, production gradually ceased during the 1990s, and much of the historic industrial complex was redeveloped as part of the campus of the Berlin University of Applied Sciences (HTW Berlin).
