= Jerome S. Spevack =

American nuclear scientist, inventor, and engineer

- Known for: Girdler sulfide process
- Spouse: Ruth Sporn (died 1973)

Jerome S. "J.S." Spevack was an American scientist, inventor, and engineer who developed the "dual temperature exchange sulphide process" (known as the Girdler sulfide process) in 1943 while working on the Manhattan Project. This is regarded as the most cost-effective process for producing heavy water. A parallel development of this process was also achieved in 1943 by German physical chemist Karl-Hermann Geib.

== Post-war period ==
After World War II, Spevack became president of Deuterium of Canada Limited (DCL) and, in 1974, won a lawsuit against the United States government and its Atomic Energy Commission receiving protection, and compensation of US$1.5 million, over their use of the Girdler sulfide process without his consent.
