= Girdler sulfide process =

Industrial process for heavy water purification

Girdler sulfide process

The Girdler sulfide (GS) process, also known as the Geib–Spevack (GS) process, is an industrial production method for extracting heavy water (deuterium oxide, D_{2}O) from natural water. Heavy water is used in particle research, in deuterium NMR spectroscopy, deuterated solvents for proton NMR spectroscopy, heavy water nuclear reactors (as a coolant and moderator) and deuterated drugs.

In 1943, Karl-Hermann Geib and Jerome S. Spevack independently invented the process. The process is named after the Girdler Company, which constructed the first American plant to implement it.

The method is an isotopic exchange process, where isotopes of hydrogen are swapped between hydrogen sulfide (H_{2}S) and water (H_{2}O), also known as "light" water, that produces heavy water over several steps. This process is highly energy intensive.

Until its closure in 1997, the Bruce Heavy Water Plant in Ontario (located on the same site as Douglas Point and the Bruce Nuclear Generating Station) was the world's largest heavy water production plant, with a peak capacity of 1600 tonnes per year (800 tonnes per year per full plant, two fully operational plants at its peak). It used the Girdler sulfide process to produce heavy water, and required by mass 340000 units of feed water to produce 1 unit of heavy water.

The first such facility of India's Heavy Water Board to use the Girdler process is at Rawatbhata near Kota, Rajasthan. This was followed by a larger plant at Manuguru, Andhra Pradesh. Other plants exist in the United States and Romania, for example. Romania, India, and the former supplier of much of the world's heavy water demand, Canada, all have operating heavy water reactors with two at Cernavodă Nuclear Power Plant in Romania making up the country's entire fleet and several each in India (mostly IPHWR) and Canada (exclusively CANDU).

== The process ==
Each of a number of steps consists of two sieve tray columns. One column is maintained at 30 °C (86 °F) and is called the 'cold tower' and the other at 130 °C (266 °F) and is called the 'hot tower'. The enrichment process is based on the difference in separation between 30 °C and 130 °C.

The process of interest is the equilibrium reaction,

H_{2}O + HDS ⇌ HDO + H_{2}S

At 30 °C, the equilibrium constant K = 2.33, while at 130 °C, K = 1.82. This difference is exploited for enriching deuterium in heavy water.

Hydrogen sulfide gas is circulated in a closed loop between the cold tower and the hot tower (although these can be separate towers, they can also be separate sections of one tower, with the cold section at the top). Demineralised and deaerated water is fed to the cold tower where deuterium migration preferentially takes place from the hydrogen sulfide gas to the liquid water. Normal water is fed to the hot tower where deuterium transfer takes place from the liquid water to the hydrogen sulfide gas. In cascade systems, the same water is used for both inputs. The mechanism for this is the difference in the equilibrium constant; in the cold tower, deuterium concentration in the hydrogen sulfide is lowered, and the concentration in the water raised. The deuterium in the hot loop slightly prefers to be in the hydrogen sulfide, resulting in excess deuterium in the hydrogen sulfide relative to the cold tower. For n moles of deuterium per mole of protium in the hot tower input water, there are n/1.82 moles per mole of protium in the hydrogen sulfide. In the cold tower, part of this deuterium is transferred to the cold tower input water, in accordance with the equilibrium constant. At the input to the cold tower, the ratio of products to reactants in the above equation is 1.82, since both input streams have equal concentrations of deuterium. The chemical equilibrium tries to force more deuterium into the water to correct the ratio. Ideally for equal amounts of water and hydrogen sulfide, the cold tower should output water with 12% more deuterium than it entered. Enriched water is output from the cold tower, while depleted water is output from the hot tower.

An appropriate cascade system accomplishes enrichment: enriched water is fed into another separation unit and is further enriched.

Normally in this process, water is enriched to 15–20% D_{2}O. Further enrichment to "reactor-grade" heavy water (> 99% D_{2}O) is done in another process, e.g. distillation.
