= Sœur de la Chapelle =

French nun and playwright

Sœur de la Chapelle ("sister of the chapel") was a French nun in the second half of the 17th century who wrote a tragedy about the martyrdom of Saint Catherine of Alexandria.

== Biography ==
Little is known of Sœur de La Chapelle's life apart from the fact she authored a tragedy, The Illustrious Philosopher, or the Story of Saint Catherine of Alexandria (L'Illustre philosophe, ou l'histoire de Sainte-Catherine d'Alexandrie), about the saint's martyrdom. It was published in 1663 in Autun, France, and the dedication page was signed "De La Chapelle Rel. C.", with the abbreviation signifying that the author was a cloistered nun. This suggests that she belonged to one of the three communities of nuns then established in the region of Autun. A report by the vicar general of the Roman Catholic Diocese of Autun following a 1676 visit further suggests that her name was Anne de la Capelle-Biron and that she was a member of the Benedictine abbey of Saint-Jean-le-Grand in the Autun diocese.

The play itself centers on the story of Saint Catherine of Alexandria, who according to tradition was martyred at the age of 18 or so during the reign of the later Roman emperor Maxentius (c. 278–312) after she rebuked the emperor for his persecution of Christians. The story goes that the emperor summoned 50 scholars to turn her away from Christianity through a debate, an attempt that failed when Catherine—herself a noted scholar—not only won the debate but converted several of her opponents to Christianity. In Sœur de La Chapelle's play, the number of Catherine's opponents is reduced to a single figure, Lucius, for dramatic convenience, placing it in the long tradition of the Socratic dialogue. The play is infused with Cartesian thought, evident in the way its author positions the "miraculous" conversion of Lucius as actually not miraculous at all but rather a product of rational argument.

It appears that Sœur de La Chapelle may be the only French nun during the 17th century to have published a play. She used the respected genre of religious tragedy as a vehicle to put Saint Catherine forward as a champion of intellectual equality between men and women and to advocate for the better education of girls. Her use of a sacred subject to achieve a public voice at a time when there were very few women writers has parallels with the careers of the 17th-century playwright Marthe Cosnard and poet Françoise Pascal.
