= Portrait of Gerard de Lairesse =

Painting by Rembrandt, 1665–1667

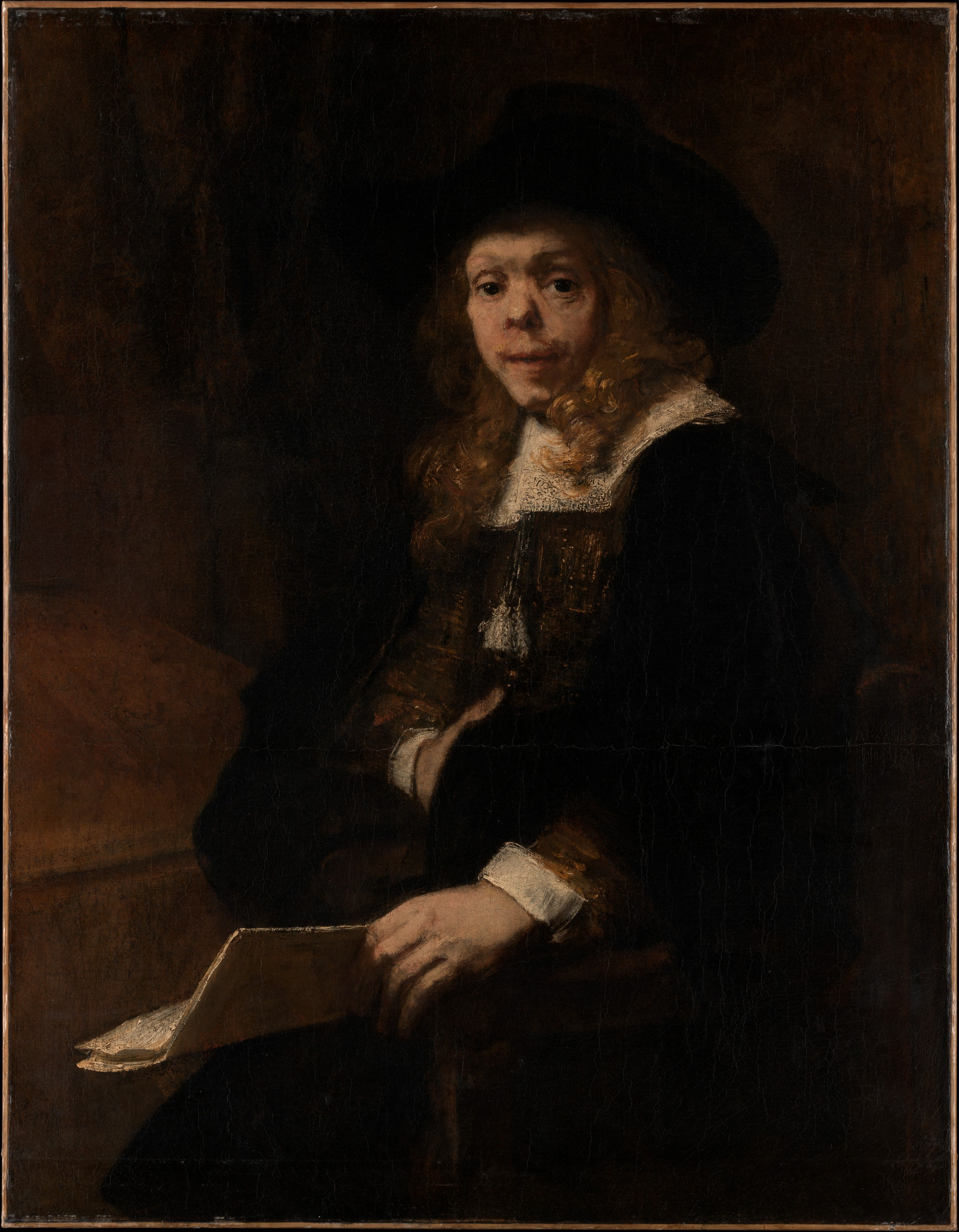
- Artist: Rembrandt
- Year: c. 1665–1667
- Medium: oil paint, canvas
- Dimensions: 112.7 cm (44.4 in) × 87.6 cm (34.5 in)
- Location: Metropolitan Museum of Art
- Owner: Robert Lehman, Leopold Koppel
- Accession no.: 1975.1.140
- Identifiers: RKDimages ID: 33929; The Met object ID: 459082

Portrait of Gerard de Lairesse is a 1665–1667 oil-on-canvas painting by Rembrandt. It shows the painter Gerard de Lairesse holding a paper. It is in the collection of the Metropolitan Museum of Art.

== Description ==
This portrait came into the collection via the Robert Lehman bequest.

This painting was documented by Hofstede de Groot in 1914, who wrote:

658. GERARD DE LAIRESSE (September 11, 1640-July 21, 1711), painter. Three-quarter length; life size. He sits in an arm-chair, turned to the left and looking at the spectator. His left hand, which rests on the arm of the chair, holds a paper. His right hand is thrust into the coat at his breast. His rich curls fall on his broad and smooth white collar, which has two tassels. He wears a dark coat with a black cloak over it, and a large broad-brimmed felt hat. The identification suggested by Schmidt Degener rests on the great similarity between this portrait and that of the artist's portrait in Houbraken's Groote Schouburgh. Further evidence may be found in the fact that Lairesse, like the sitter, is said to have been a syphilitic; cf. Houbraken, i. 285.

Signed, "Rembrandt f. 1663" (or 1665, according to Degener); canvas, 44 1/2 inches by 34 1/2 inches. Mentioned by Bode, Jahrbuch der Koniglichen Preussischen Kunst-Sammlungen, xxix. p. 181; F. Schmidt Degener, Onze Kunst, xxiii. 1913, i. p. 117. Exhibited in Berlin, 1909, No. 110. Sales. Amsterdam, June 16, 1802, No. 144 (94 florins, Lafontaine). London, June 13, 1807, No. 16 (£25 : 4s.). London, about 1908. In the possession of Lewis and Simmons, London.

In the collection of Leopold Koppel, Berlin.

Koppel still owned the painting in 1935 when he was forced to divest all of his interests due to the Aryanization of German businesses in Berlin under Hitler. According to the MET, the painting was consigned to M. Knoedler and Co, New York by Albert L. Koppel, on October 1, 1943. Knoedler subsequently purchased it from him on April 27, 1945, whereupon it was purchased by Robert Lehman.

== Portraits of Gerard de Lairesse ==
The painting shows his syphilitic saddle nose, that was featured more prominently in the engraving Hofstede de Groot mentioned:

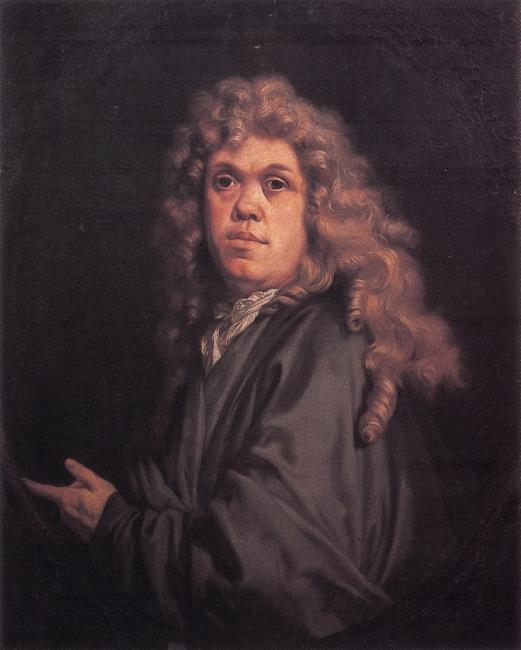
Self-portrait in the Uffizi Gallery

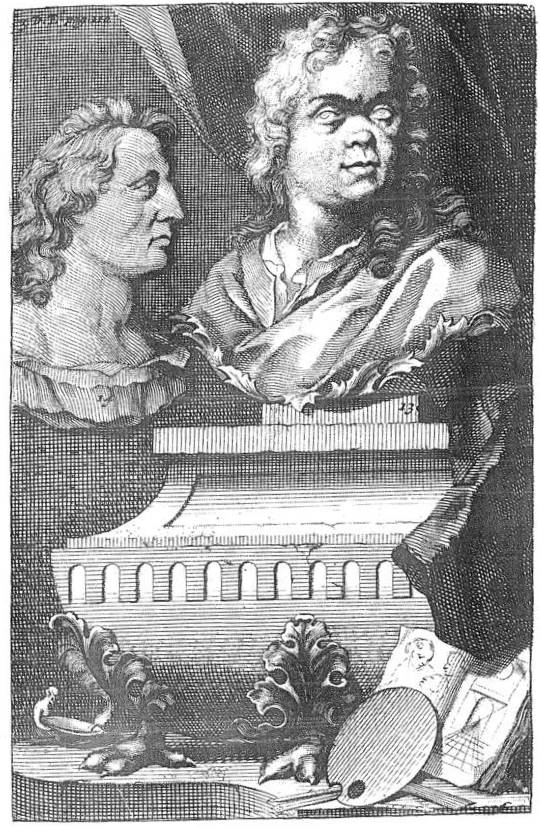
Houbraken: Bartholet Flemal (left) and De Lairesse (right)

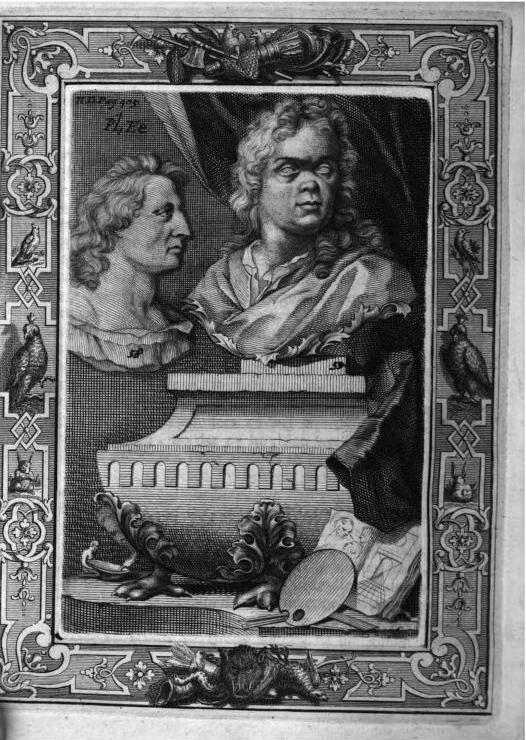
Copy by Jacob Campo Weyerman

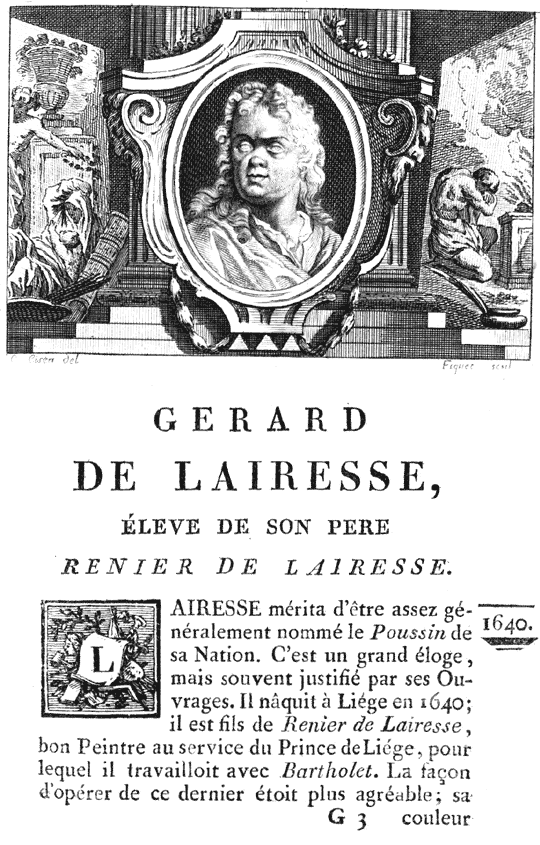
Copy of the bust portion (in reverse) by Jean-Baptiste Descamps
