= Catherine of Alexandria =

Early 4th-century Christian virgin martyr

Saint Catherine of Alexandria
- Caravaggio, Saint Catherine of Alexandria, 1598–99, Thyssen-Bornemisza Museum

Virgin and martyr
- Born: c. 287; Alexandria, Roman Egypt
- Died: c. 305 (aged 17–18); Alexandria, Roman Egypt
- Venerated in: Catholic Church; Eastern Orthodox Church; Oriental Orthodox Churches; Anglican Communion; Lutheranism
- Canonized: Pre-Congregation
- Major shrine: Saint Catherine's Monastery
- Feast: 25 November
- Attributes: breaking wheel; sword; with a crown at her feet; hailstones; bridal veil and ring; dove; surrounded by angels, scourge; book; woman arguing with pagan philosophers
- Patronage: Unmarried girls; apologists; craftsmen who work with a wheel (potters, spinners); archivists; dying people; educators; girls; jurists; knife sharpeners; lacemakers; lawyers; librarians; libraries; Balliol College; Massey College; maidens; mechanics; millers; milliners; nurses; philosophers; preachers; scholars; schoolchildren; scribes; secretaries; spinsters; stenographers; students; tanners; theologians; St. Catherine University; University of Oviedo; University of Paris; haberdashers; wheelwrights; Aalsum, Germany; Żejtun, Malta; Żurrieq, Malta; Katerini, Greece; Grude, Belgium; Stabroek, Bosnia and Herzegovina; Pagbilao, Quezon, Philippines; Gerona, Tarlac, Carcar, Cebu, Porac, Pampanga, Arayat, Pampanga, Dumaguete, Santa Catalina, Negros Oriental, Santa Catalina, Ilocos Sur, Santa, Ilocos Sur, Leon, Iloilo, Tayum, Abra, Diocese of Dumaguete, Negros Oriental, University of Santo Tomas; Bagac, Bataan, Santa Catarina (state), Brazil.

Catherine of Alexandria, also spelled Katherine, (Note: Also referred to as Saint Catherine of Alexandria, Saint Catherine of the Wheel and The Great Martyr Saint Catherine (Coptic: Ϯⲁⲅⲓⲁ Ⲕⲁⲧⲧⲣⲓⲛ; Ancient Greek: ἡ Ἁγία Αἰκατερίνη ἡ Μεγαλομάρτυς, "Holy Catherine the Great Martyr"; Arabic: القديسة كاترين; Latin: Catharina Alexandrina).) was, according to tradition, a Christian virgin and martyr, who suffered martyrdom in the early 4th century at the hands of the emperor Maxentius. According to her hagiography, she was both a princess and a noted scholar who became a Christian around age 14 and converted hundreds of people to Christianity.

The Eastern Orthodox Church venerates her as a great martyr and celebrates her feast day on 24 or 25 November, depending on the regional tradition. In Catholicism, Catherine is traditionally revered as one of the Fourteen Holy Helpers, and she is commemorated in the Roman Martyrology on 25 November. Her feast was removed from the General Roman Calendar in 1969 but restored in 2002 as an optional memorial. In the Episcopal Church, St. Catherine is commemorated on 24 November, together with the martyrs Barbara of Nicomedia and Margaret of Antioch, while in the Church of England her feast day is 25 November.

Some modern scholars consider that the legend of Catherine was probably based on the life and murder of the virgin Saint Dorothea of Alexandria and, according to some sources, the Greek philosopher Hypatia, despite her death occurring 110 years later, with the reversed role of a Christian and neoplatonist being suggested in the case of the latter. On the other hand, Leon Clugnet, writing in the Catholic Encyclopedia, states "although contemporary hagiographers look upon the authenticity of the various texts containing the legend of St. Catherine as more than doubtful, it is not therefore meant to cast even the shadow of a doubt around the existence of the saint".

== Life ==
According to the traditional narrative, Catherine was the daughter of Sabinella and Constus (or Costus), the governor of Alexandria during the reign of the Emperor Maximian (286–305). She was a Greco-Egyptian. From a young age she devoted herself to study. A vision of the Virgin Mary and the Child Jesus persuaded her to become a Christian. When the persecutions began under the Emperor Maxentius, she went to the Emperor and rebuked him for his cruelty. The Emperor summoned 50 of the best pagan philosophers and orators to dispute with her, hoping that they would refute her pro-Christian arguments, but Catherine won the debate. Several of her adversaries, conquered by her eloquence, declared themselves Christians and were at once put to death.

=== Torture and martyrdom ===
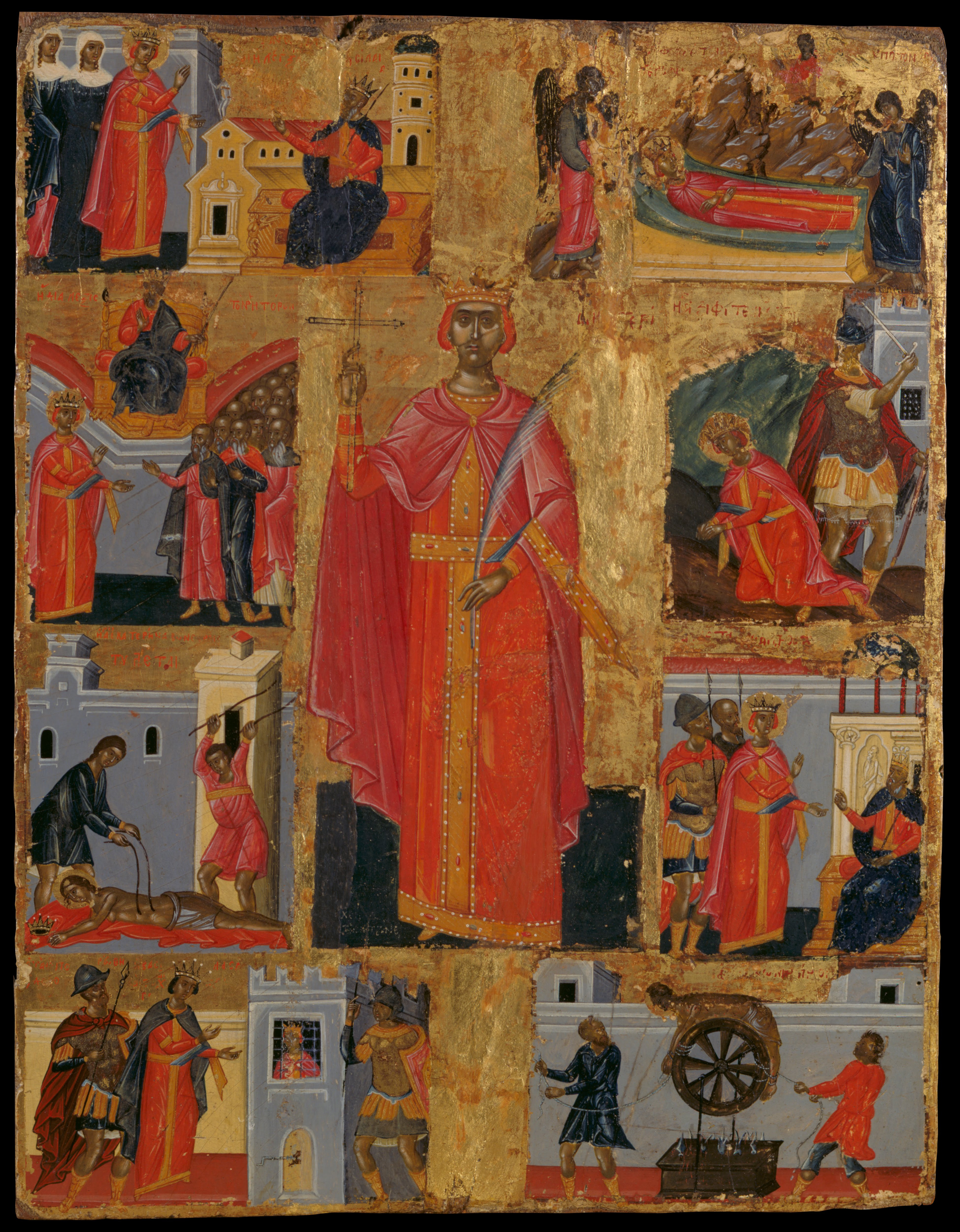
Icon of Saint Catherine of Alexandria, with scenes from her martyrdom

The emperor gave orders to subject Catherine to terrible tortures and then throw her in prison. Her legend tells that during the confinement she was fed daily by a dove from heaven, and Christ also visited her, encouraging her to fight bravely, and promised her the crown of everlasting glory. Angels tended her wounds with salve.

During her imprisonment more than 200 people came to see her, including Maxentius' wife, Valeria Maximilla; all converted to Christianity and were subsequently martyred. Maxentius offered Catherine a place in his imperial household, but Catherine refused, declaring that she had dedicated her life to Jesus Christ.

The furious emperor condemned Catherine to death on a spiked breaking wheel, but at her touch it shattered. Maxentius ordered her to be beheaded. Catherine ordered the execution to commence. As per her legend, a milk-like substance rather than blood flowed from her neck.

=== Veneration ===
In the 6th century, the Eastern Emperor Justinian had established what is now Saint Catherine's Monastery in Egypt, which had originally been built encircling the purported burning bush seen by Moses. Countless people make the pilgrimage to the monastery to receive miracle healing from Catherine.

== Historicity ==
Sometimes cited as a possible inspiration of Catherine, Eusebius wrote around 320 that Maximinus had ordered a young Christian woman to come to his palace to become his mistress, and when she refused, he had her punished by having her banished and her estates confiscated. Eusebius did not name the woman but Rufinus of Aquileia names her Dorothea (Δωροθέα) in his translation of Eusebius' work. A sixteenth-century Italian historian, Caesar Baronius (c.1538–1607), suggested that Catherine and Dorothea were the same person and that Catherine (Hecaterina) was her former pagan name while Dorothea (the gift of God) was the name given to her at the time of baptism.

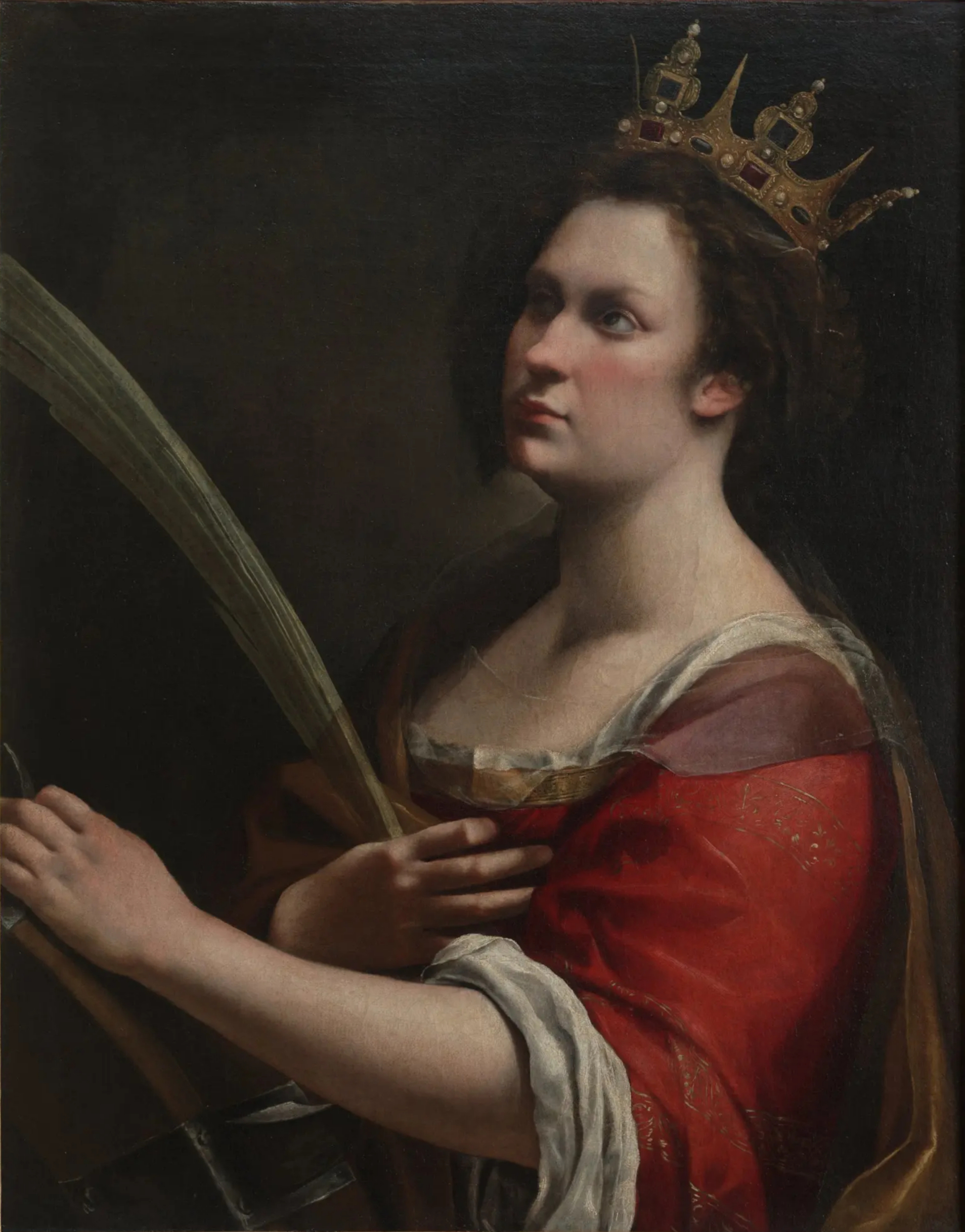
Saint Catherine of Alexandria by Artemisia Gentileschi, c. 1619

The Catholic Encyclopedia, while not denying her historicity, states that most of the details that embellish the narrative, as well as the long discourses attributed to Catherine, are to be rejected as later inventions. According to the Encyclopædia Britannica, no extant written mention of Catherine of Alexandria is known before the 9th century, and "her historicity is doubtful."

Donald Attwater dismisses what he calls the "legend" of Saint Catherine, arguing for a lack of any "positive evidence that she ever existed outside the mind of some Greek writer who first composed what he intended to be simply an edifying romance." Harold Davis writes that "assiduous research has failed to identify Catherine with any historical personage."

Anna Brownell Jameson was the first to argue that the life of Catherine was confused with that of the slightly later neoplatonist philosopher Hypatia of Alexandria. Hypatia was a Greek mathematician, astronomer, and philosopher who was murdered by the Parabalani after being accused of exacerbating a conflict between two prominent figures in Alexandria, the governor Orestes and the bishop Cyril. The idea that Catherine's life was either based on or became confused with the life of the pagan Hypatia has become a popular theory among modern scholars since. However, while Christine Walsh accepts the many parallels between Catherine and Hypatia, she does not believe there is any evidence for or against the idea that Catherine was created based on Hypatia.

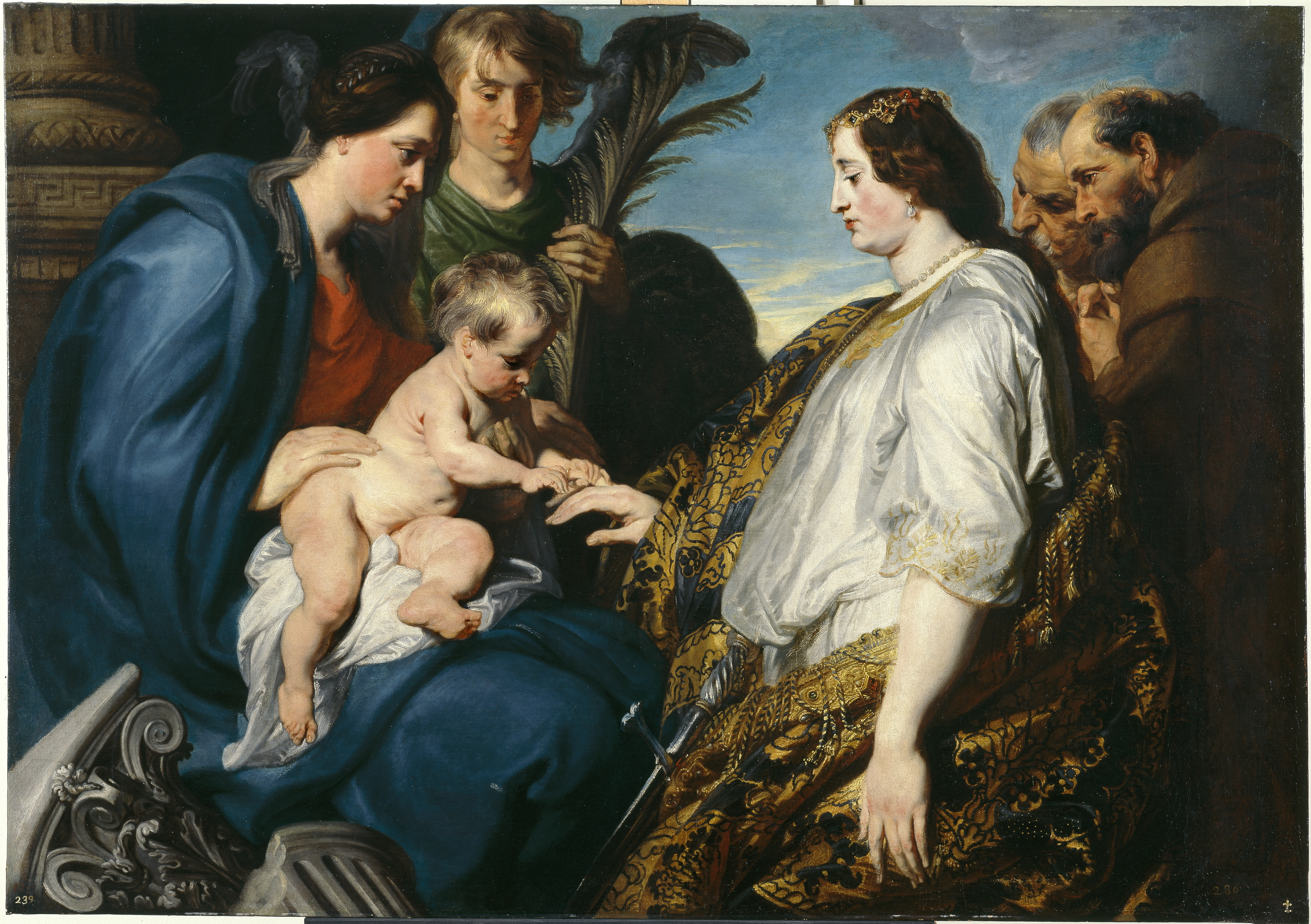
The Mystic Marriage of Saint Catherina by Anthony van Dyck, 1618-20.

The earliest surviving account of Catherine's life comes around 600 years after the traditional date of her martyrdom, in the Menologium, a document compiled for Emperor Basil II in 976, although the alleged rediscovery of her relics at Saint Catherine's Monastery at the foot of Mount Sinai was about 800 and presumably implies an existing cult at that date (though the common name of the monastery developed after the discovery).

In her book The Cult of St Katherine of Alexandria in Early Medieval Europe, Christine Walsh discusses "the historical Katherine":

As we have seen, the cult of St Katherine of Alexandria probably originated in oral traditions from the 4th-century Diocletianic Persecutions of Christians in Alexandria. There is no evidence that Katherine herself was a historical figure, and she may well have been a composite drawn from memories of women persecuted for their faith. Many aspects of her Passio are clearly legendary and conform to well-known hagiographical topoi.

— Walsh 2007, p. 143

== Name ==
Her name appears in Greek as Αἰκατερίνη (Aikaterínē) or Ἑκατερίνη (Ekaterínē). The etymology is debated: it could derive from ἑκάτερος (hekáteros, "each of two"); it could derive from the name of the goddess Hecate; it could be related to Greek αἰκία (aikía, "insult, outrage, suffering, torture"); or it could be from a Coptic name meaning "my consecration of your name". In the early Christian era, it became associated with Greek καθαρός (katharós, "pure"), and the Latin spelling was changed from Katerina to Katharina to reflect this.

== Medieval cult ==
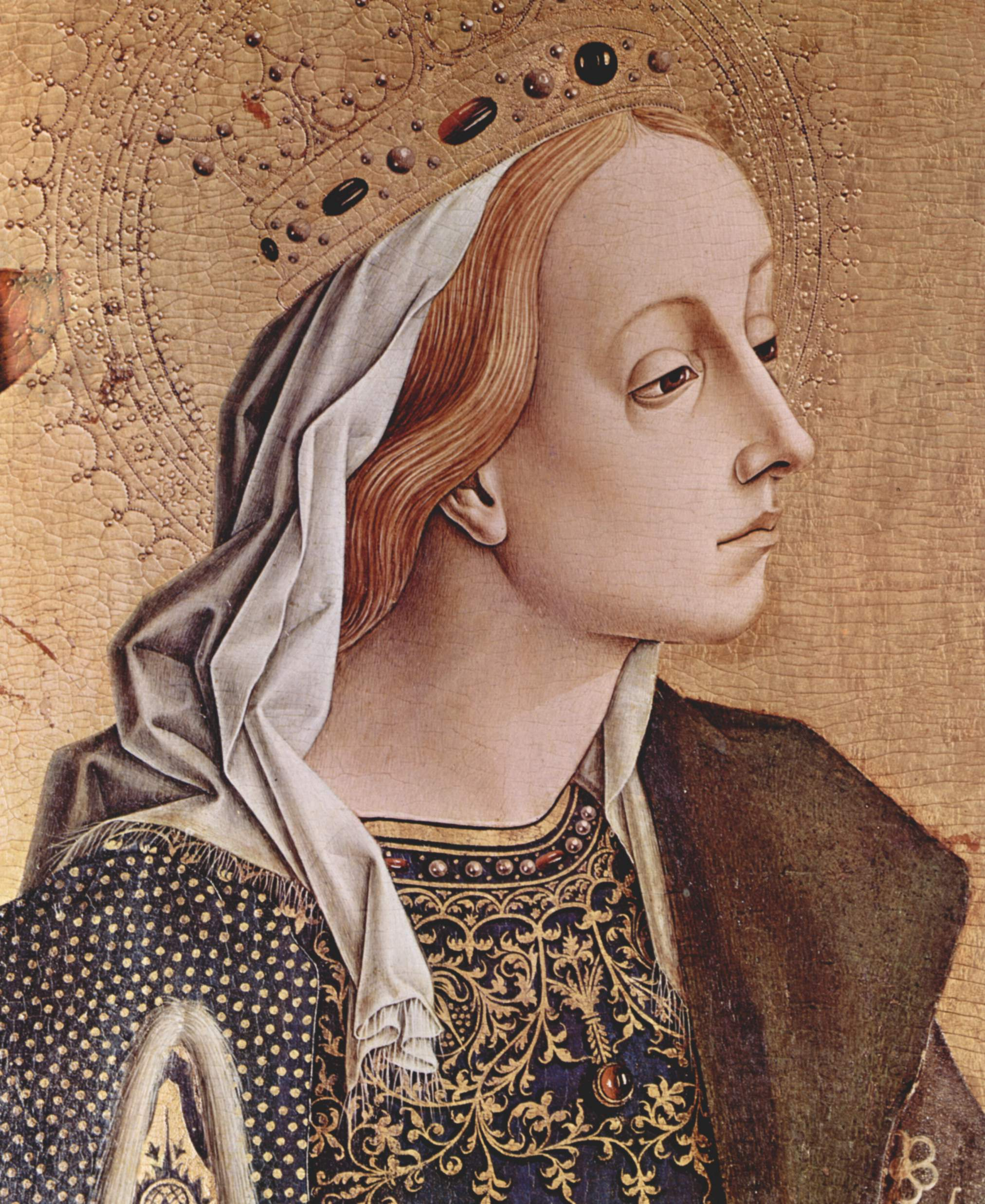
Catherine of Alexandria, by Carlo Crivelli

Catherine was one of the most important saints in the religious culture of the late Middle Ages and arguably considered the most important of the virgin martyrs, a group including Agnes of Rome, Margaret of Antioch, Barbara, Lucia of Syracuse, Valerie of Limoges and many others. Her power as an intercessor was renowned and firmly established in most versions of her hagiography, in which she specifically entreats Christ at the moment of her death to answer the prayers of those who remember her martyrdom and invoke her name.

The development of her medieval cult was spurred by the alleged rediscovery of her body around 800 (about 500 years after her death) at Mount Sinai, supposedly with hair still growing and a constant stream of healing oil issuing from her body. There are several pilgrimage narratives that chronicle the journey to Mount Sinai, most notably those of John Mandeville and Friar Felix Fabri. However, while the monastery at Mount Sinai was the best-known site of Catherine pilgrimage, it was also the most difficult to reach. The most prominent Western shrine was the monastery in Rouen that claimed to house Catherine's fingers. It was not alone in the west, however, and was accompanied by many scattered shrines and altars dedicated to Catherine throughout France and England. Some were better-known sites, such as Canterbury and Westminster, which claimed a phial of her oil, brought back from Mount Sinai by Edward the Confessor. Other shrines, such as St. Catherine's Hill, Hampshire were the focus of generally local pilgrimage, many of which are only identified by brief mentions in various texts, rather than by physical evidence.

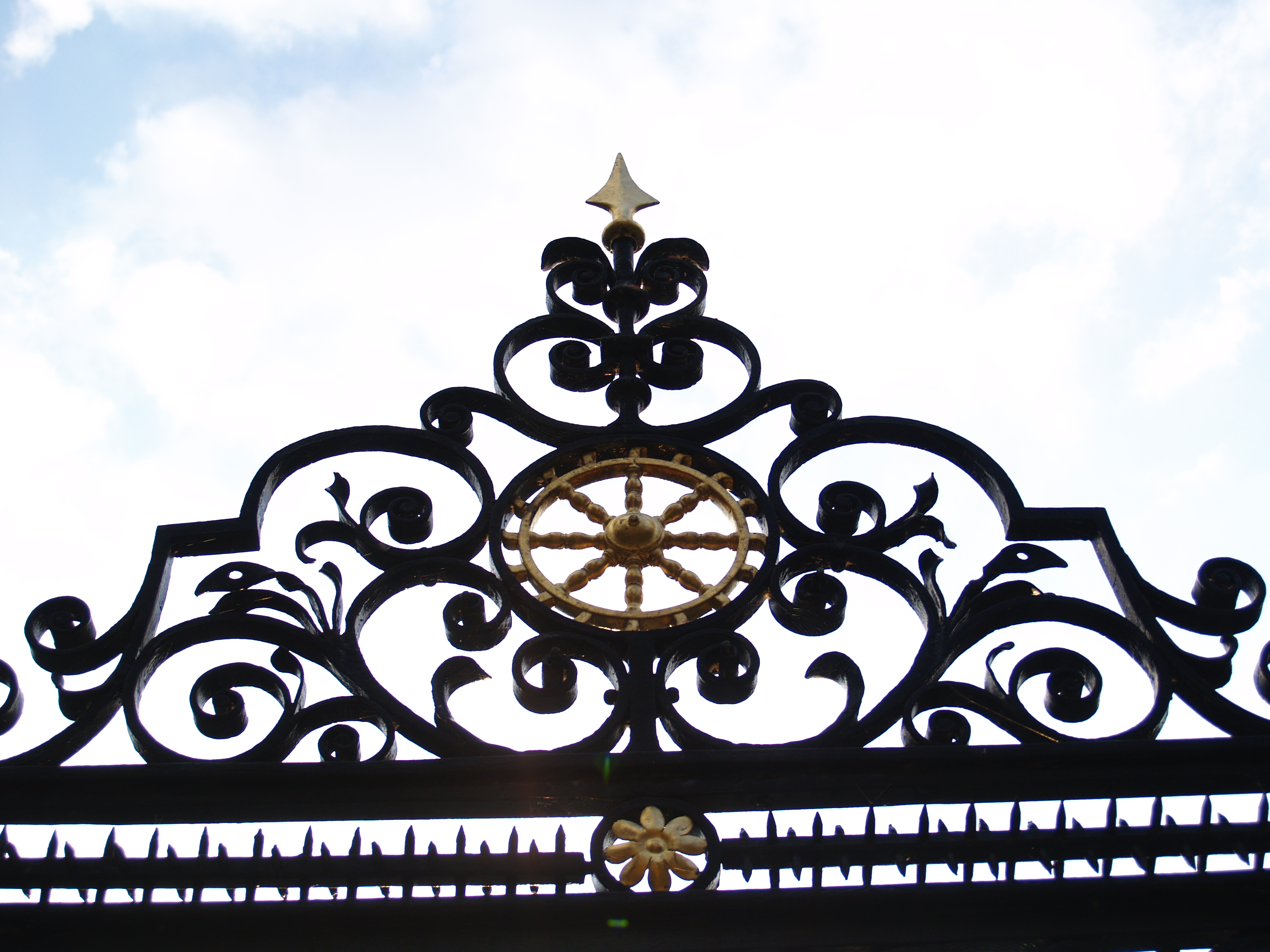
St. Catharine's College, Cambridge Gate Catharine Wheel

St. Catharine's College, Cambridge was founded on St Catharine's Day (25 November) 1473 by Robert Woodlark (provost of King's College, Cambridge) who sought to create a small community of scholars who would study exclusively theology and philosophy. Woodlark may have chosen the name in homage to Catherine of Valois, mother of Henry VI of England, although it is more likely that it was named as part of the Renaissance cult of Saint Catherine, who was a patron saint of learning. St Catherine's College, Oxford, developed from the Delegacy for Unattached Students, formed in 1868.

Catherine also had a large female following, whose devotion was less likely to be expressed through pilgrimage. The importance of the virgin martyrs as the focus of devotion and models for proper feminine behaviour increased during the Late Middle Ages. Among these, St Catherine in particular was used as an exemplar for women, a status which at times superseded her intercessory role. Both Christine de Pizan and Geoffrey de la Tour Landry point to Catherine as a paragon for young women, emphasizing her model of virginity and "wifely chastity." This shows also for instance in the naming of Catalina Tomas (Catalina being the Catalan version of Catherine) whose family had a special veneration of Catherine of Alexandria. From the early 14th century the mystic marriage of Saint Catherine first appears in hagiographical literature and, soon after, in art. In the Western church, the popularity of her cult began to reduce in the 18th century.

== Veneration ==
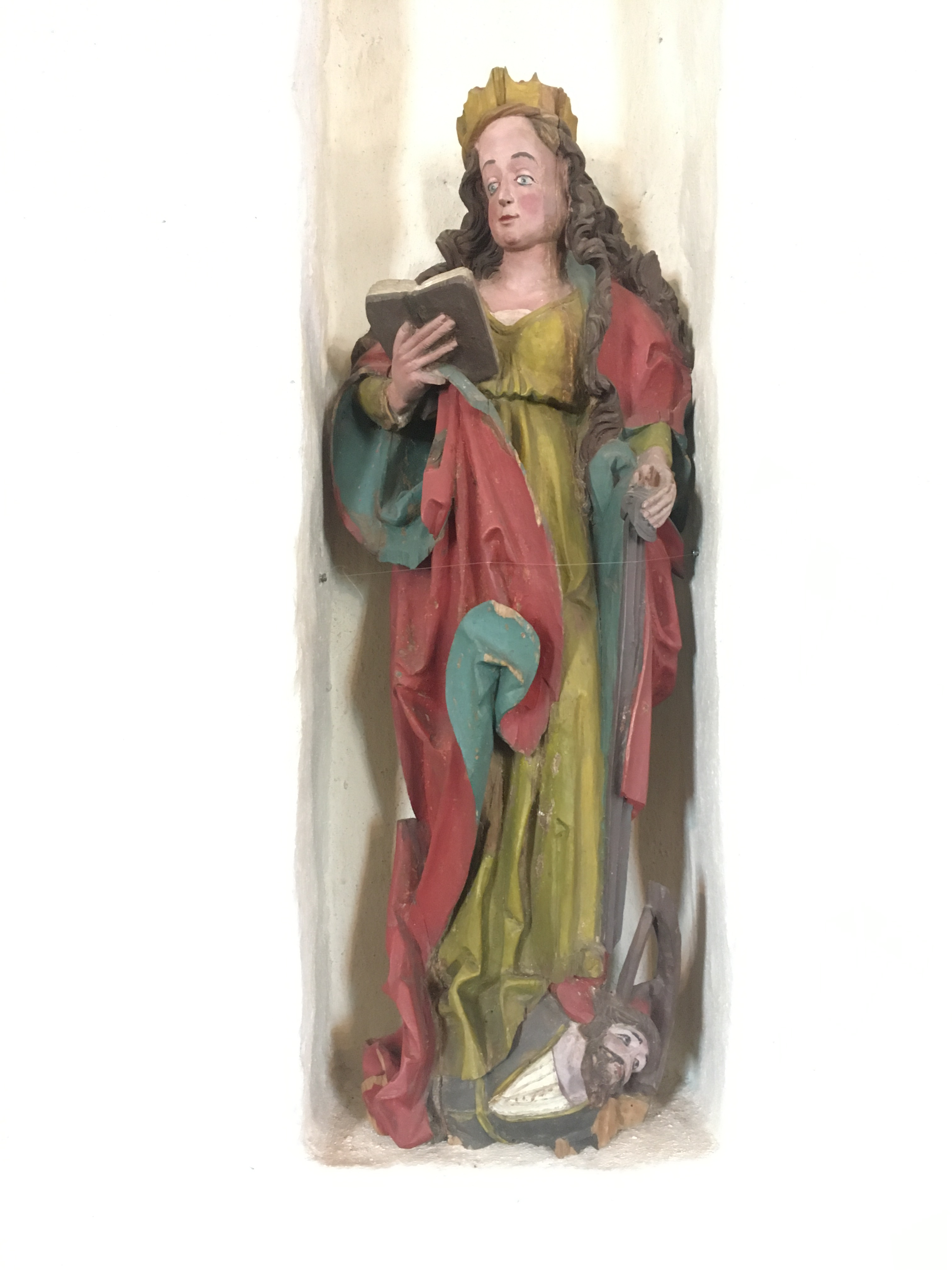
Saint Catherine of Alexandria Wood Statue at the Korpo Church in Finland.

Her principal symbol is the spiked wheel, which has become known as the Catherine wheel, and her feast day is celebrated on 25 November by most denominations. In many places, her feast was celebrated with the utmost solemnity, servile work being suppressed and the devotions attended by great numbers of people. In several dioceses of France it was observed as a Holy Day of Obligation up to the beginning of the 17th century, the splendour of its ceremonial eclipsing that of the feasts of some of the apostles. Many chapels were placed under her patronage, and nearly all churches had a statue of her, representing her according to medieval iconography with a wheel, her instrument of torture.

The Russian, Serbian and Bulgarian Eastern Orthodox Churches celebrate it on 24 November. The origin of this tradition is not known. In 11th-century Kievan Rus, the feast day was celebrated on 25 November. Dimitry of Rostov in his Kniga zhyty sviatykh (Book of the Lives of the Saints), T.1 (1689) places the date of celebration on 24 November. A story that Empress Catherine the Great did not wish to share her patronal feast with the Leavetaking of the feast of the Presentation of the Theotokos and hence changed the date is not supported by historical evidence. One of the first Catholic churches to be built in Russia, the Catholic Church of St. Catherine, was named after Catherine of Alexandria because she was Catherine the Great's patron. A footnote to the entry for 25 November in The Synaxarion compiled by Hieromonk Makarios of Simonos Petra states: "Until the 16th century, the memory of St Catherine was observed on 24 Nov. According to a note by Bartholomew of Koutloumousiou inserted in the Menaion, the Fathers of Sinai transferred the date to 25 Nov. in order that the feast might be kept with greater solemnity."

The 1908 Catholic Encyclopedia describes her historical importance:

Ranked with St Margaret and St Barbara as one of the fourteen most helpful saints in heaven, she was unceasingly praised by preachers and sung by poets. It is believed that Jacques-Benigne Bossuet dedicated to her one of his most beautiful panegyrics and that Adam of St. Victor wrote a magnificent poem in her honour: Vox Sonora nostri chori.

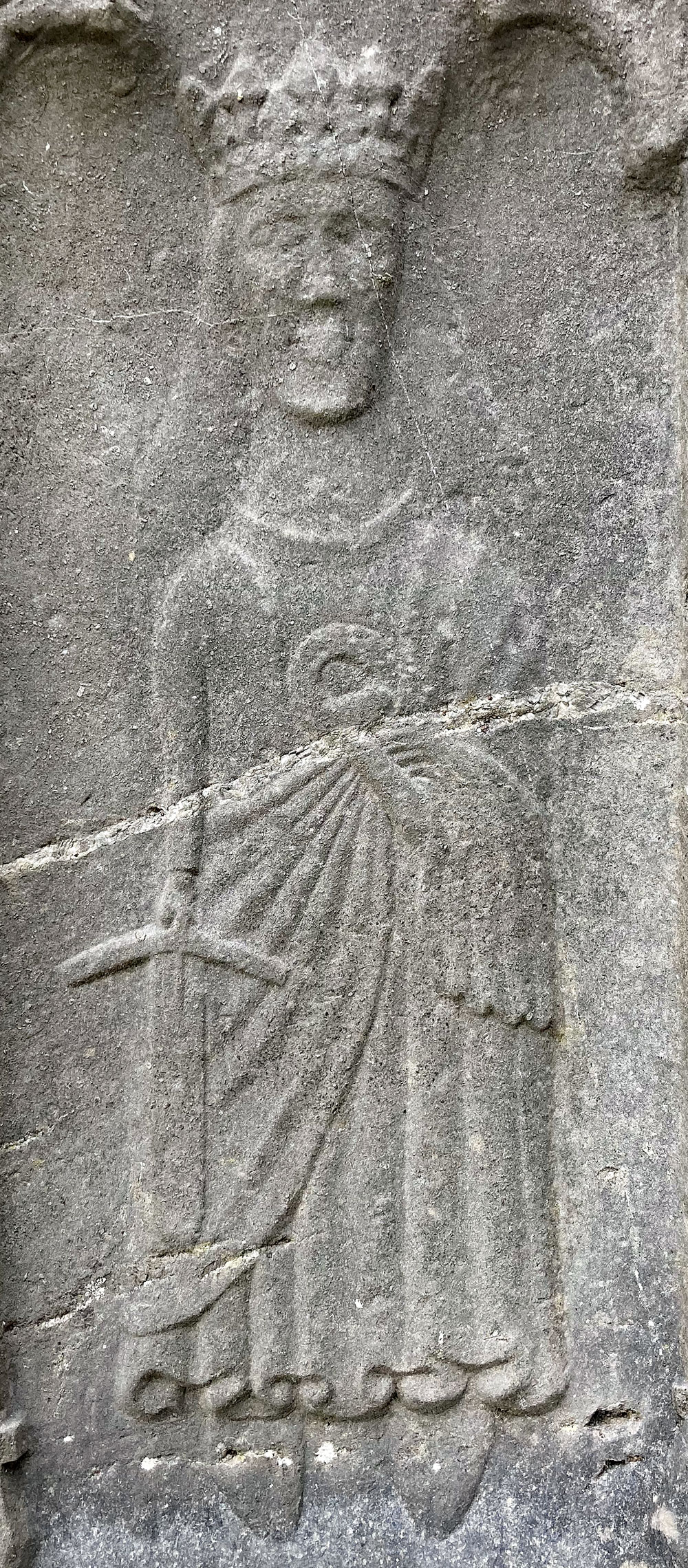
A carving of Saint Catherine of Alexandria from the O'Crean Tomb in Sligo Abbey dating from 1506.

Devotion to Catherine remains strong amongst Eastern Catholics and Eastern Orthodox Christians. With the relative ease of travel in the modern age, pilgrimages to Saint Catherine's Monastery on Mount Sinai have increased. Catherine of Alexandria is remembered in the Church of England with a commemoration on 25 November. In 2022, Catherine was officially added to the Episcopal Church liturgical calendar with a feast day she shares with Barbara of Nicomedia, and Margaret of Antioch on 24 November.

== Legacy ==
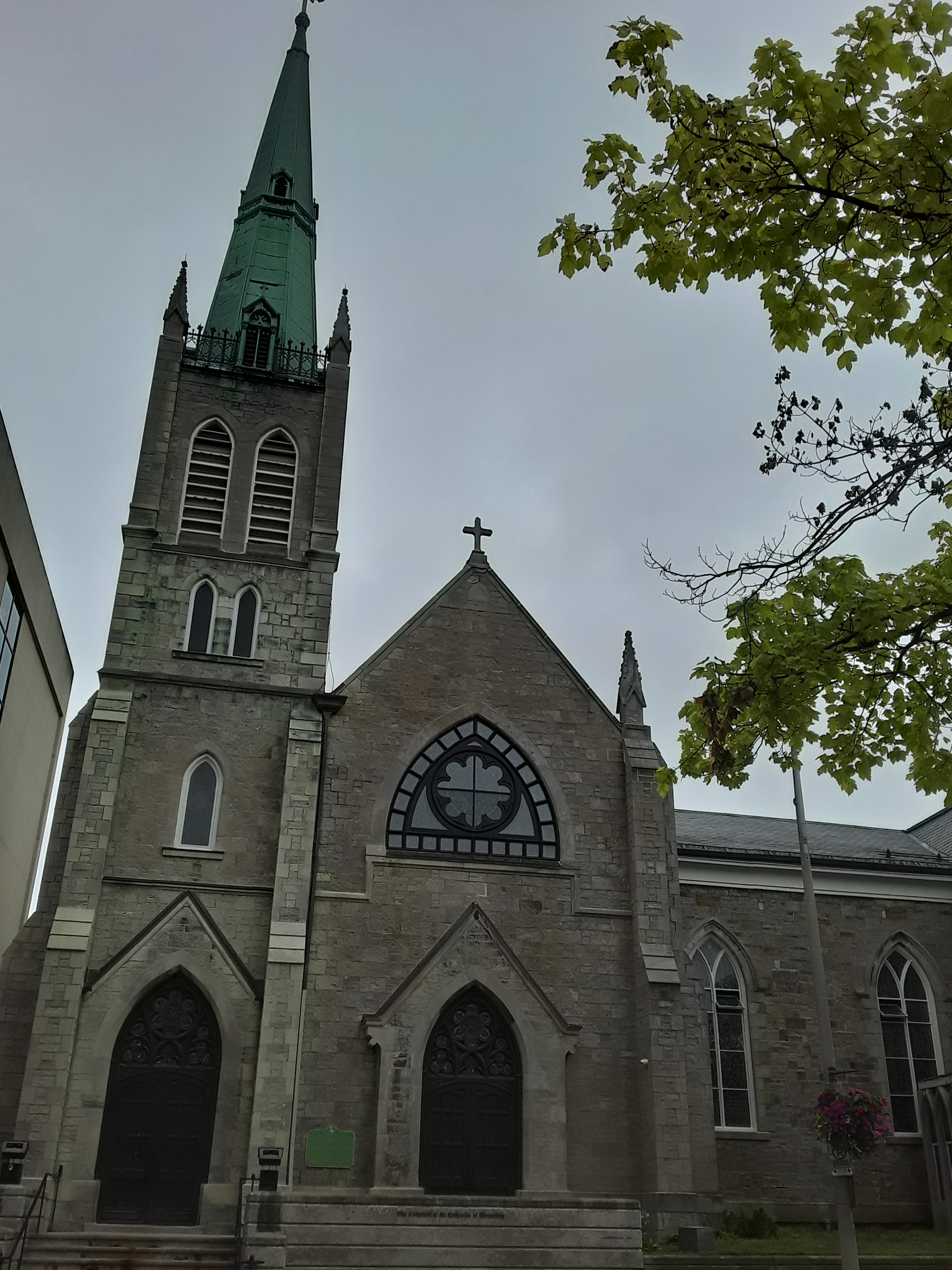
Cathedral dedicated to Catherine of Alexandria located in St. Catharines, Ontario, Canada

The pyrotechnic Catherine wheel, which rotates with sparks flying off in all directions, took its name from the saint's wheel of martyrdom. The lunar impact crater Catharina is named after Saint Catherine. Santa Catarina Island in Brazil and the State of Santa Catarina are named after her. The Gulf of Santa Catalina is located in the Pacific Ocean on the west coast of North America. Santa Catalina Island off the coast of California was named by Sebastián Vizcaíno, who arrived there on her feast day. The Santa Catalina Mountains in Arizona are named after her.

Kaarina, Finland, is named after her. Catherine of Alexandria is the patron saint of Katerini, Greece and of St. Catharines, Ontario, although "no definitive documentation exists to conclusively prove that the founders chose the unique spelling for any one particular reason" for the latter. St. Catherine of Alexandria Parish and School in Oak Lawn, Illinois, is named after her.

St. Catherine University in St. Paul, Minnesota was founded in 1905 by the Sisters of St. Joseph of Carondelet and is under the patronage of Catherine of Alexandria. University of Saint Katherine in San Marcos, California, is the first Eastern Orthodox Christian university in the United States and the English-speaking world. St. Catherine's School, is an independent Episcopal diocesan school in Richmond, Virginia. Sœur de La Chapelle was a French nun who wrote a tragedy about Saint Catherine's martyrdom. St Helen and St Katharine school in Abingdon celebrates St Katherine's day annually on the final Thursday of November.

=== Private revelations of Anne Catherine Emmerich ===
According to the private revelations attributed to Blessed Anne Catherine Emmerich, Catherine spent her childhood in Cyprus rather than Alexandria. Emmerich described her father, Costa, as descending from a princely family of Mesopotamia who had been granted extensive lands in Cyprus, and her mother as belonging to the pagan priestly family of Mercuria in Salamis, Cyprus, which was associated with the worship of the goddess Derketo.

Emmerich further related that Catherine was born and raised in the former residence of Mercuria's family, possessed extraordinary wisdom and interior visions from childhood, rejected pagan idols, and was at one point confined by her father after repeatedly removing the household idols.

== In art ==
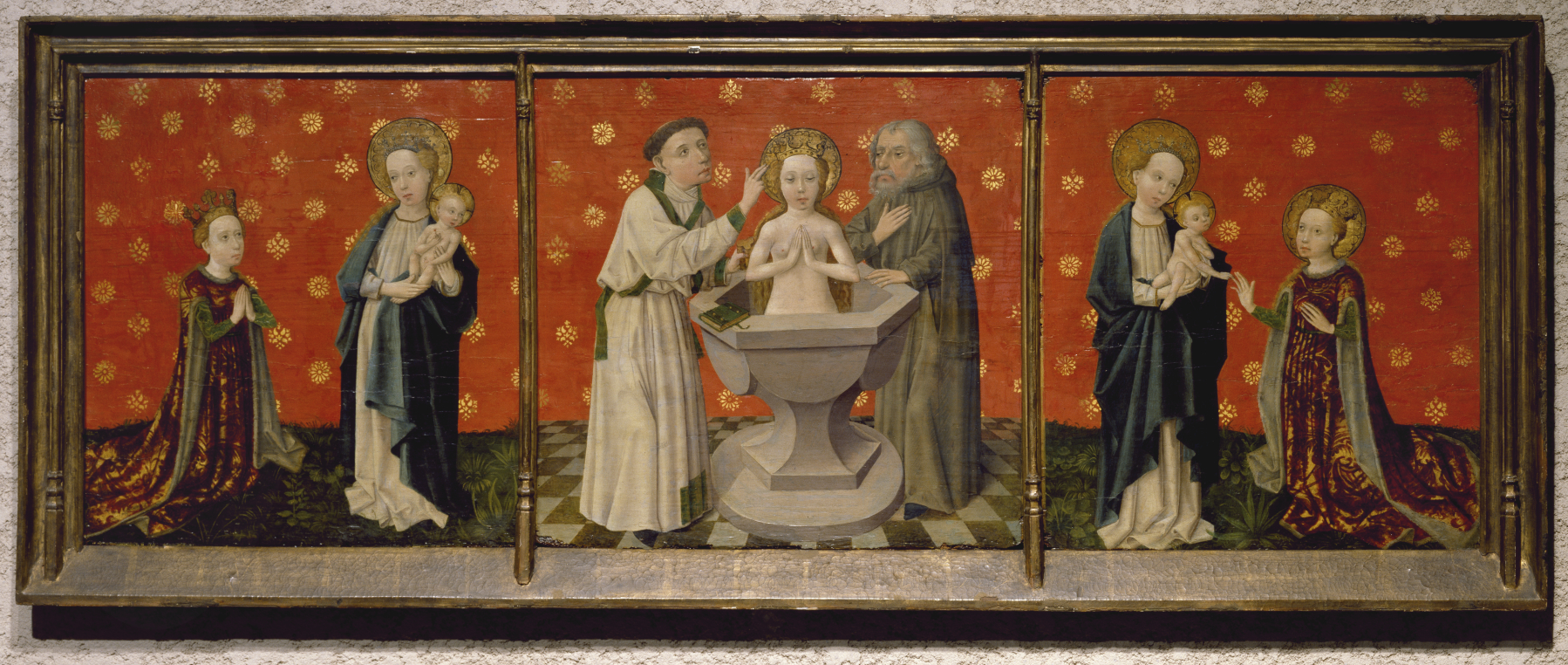
Scenes from the Life of Saint Catherine of Alexandria, Germany, c. 15th century, Walters Art Museum

Countless images of Saint Catherine are depicted in art, especially in the late Middle Ages, which is also the time that the account of Saint Catherine's Mystical Marriage makes its first literary appearance. She can usually be easily recognised as she is richly dressed and crowned, as befits her rank as a princess, and often holds or stands next to a segment of her wheel as an attribute. She also often carries either a martyr's palm or the sword with which she was actually executed. She often has long unbound blonde or reddish hair (unbound as she is unmarried). The vision of Saint Catherine of Alexandria usually shows the Infant Christ, held by the Virgin, placing a ring (one of her attributes) on her finger, following some literary accounts, although in the version in the Golden Legend he appears to be adult, and the marriage takes place among a great crowd of angels and "all the celestial court", and these may also be shown.

She is very frequently shown attending on the Virgin and Child, and is usually prominent in scenes of the Master of the Virgo inter Virgines, showing a group of virgin saints surrounding the Virgin and Child. Notable later paintings of Catherine include single figures by Raphael in the National Gallery, and by Caravaggio (in the Thyssen-Bornemisza Museum, Madrid).

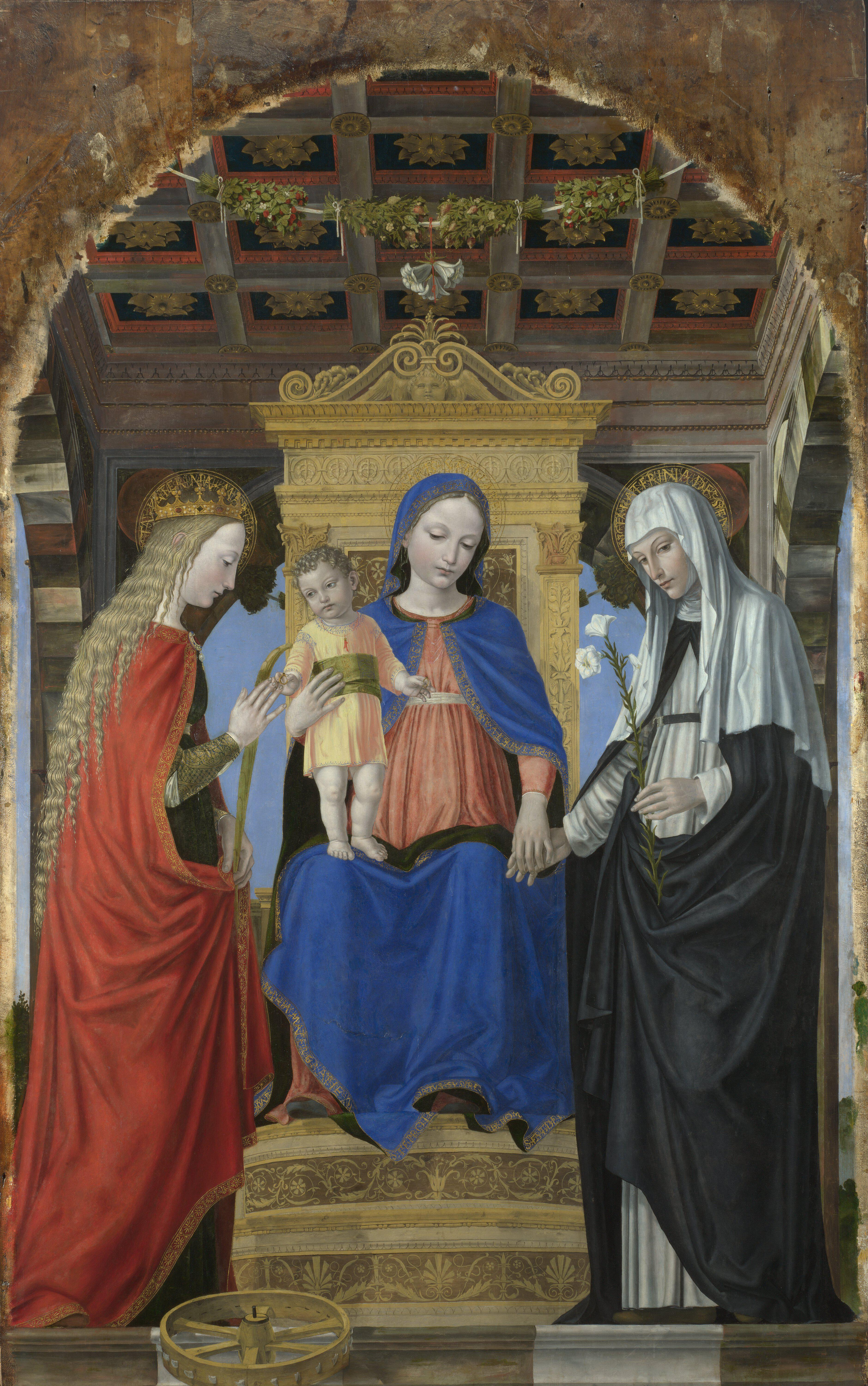
Ambrogio Bergognone. The Mystic Marriage of Saint Catherine of Alexandria and Saint Catherine of Siena

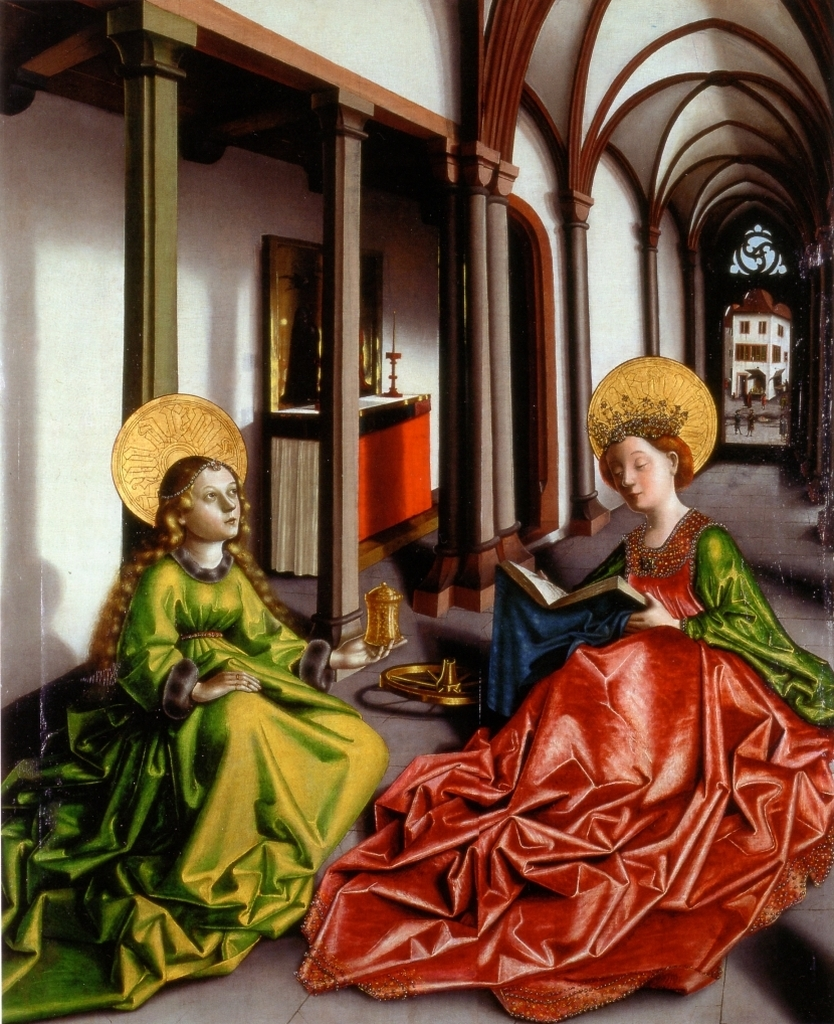
Konrad Witz, Saints Mary Magdalen and Catherine, shown as a crowned scholar with her wheel behind

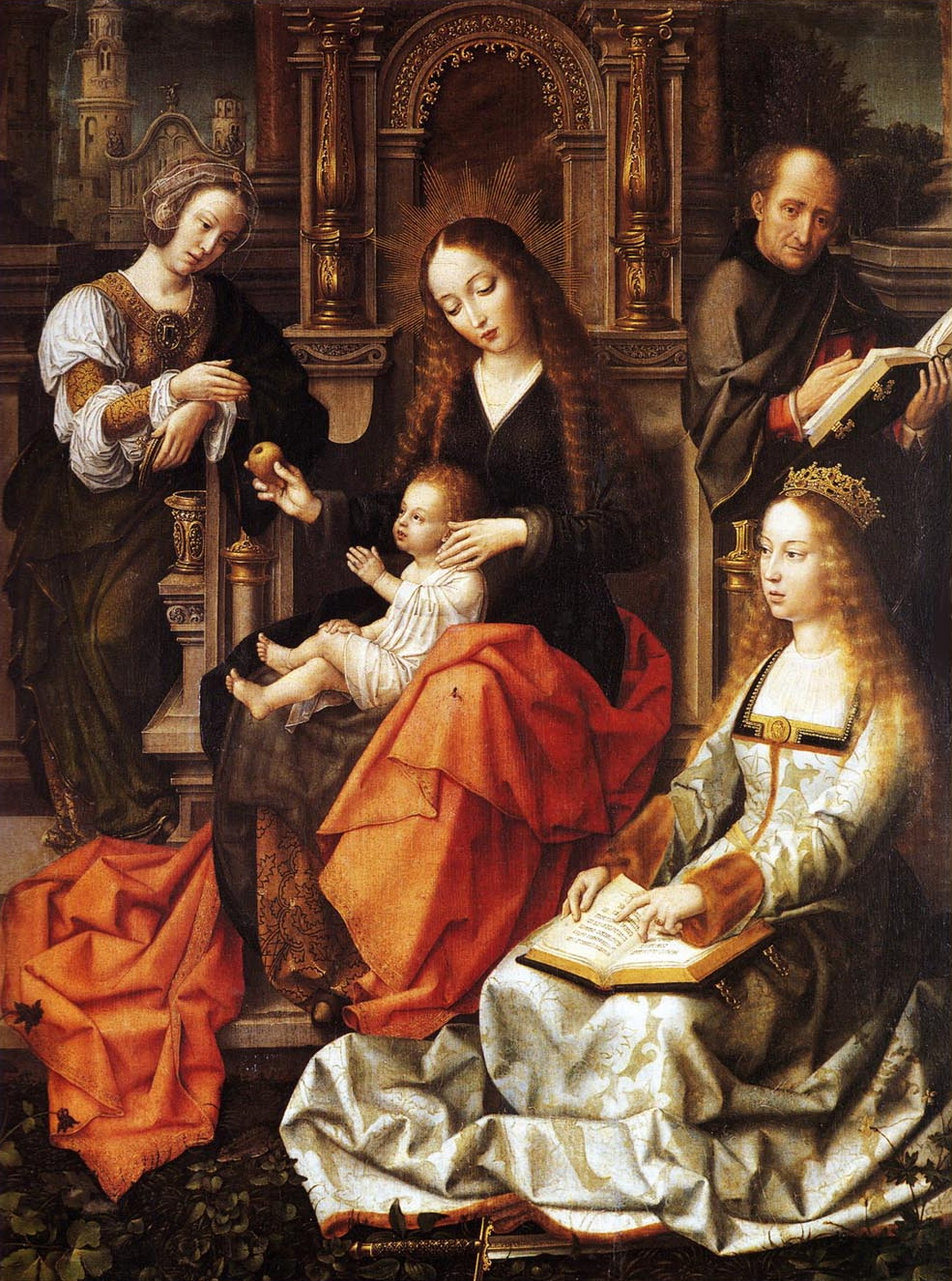
Catherine, reading again, with sword on the ground, c. 1520

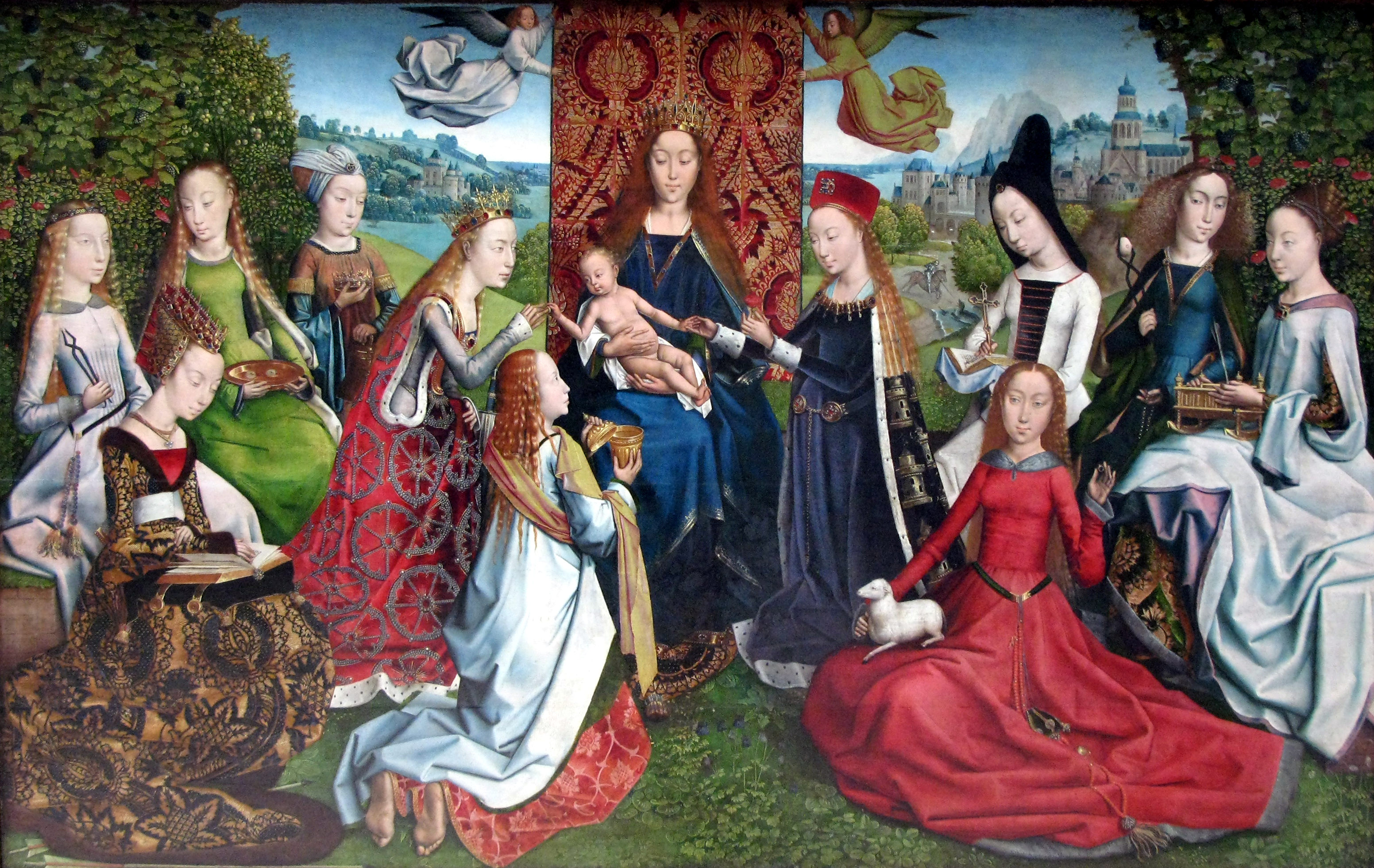
Master of the Legend of Saint Lucy, late 15th century Master of the Virgo inter Virgines

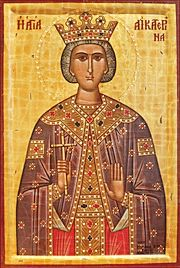
Orthodox icon

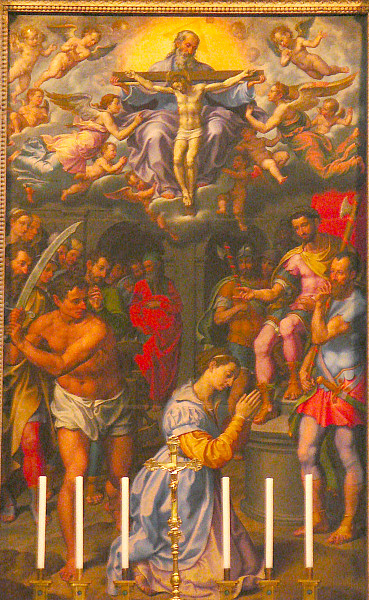
Girolamo Citolanzo, The Martyrdom of St. Catherine, Basilica of Santa Maria Maggiore, Rome

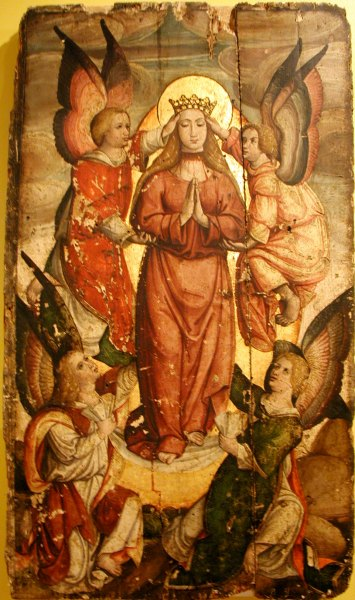
The Resurrection of the Body of St. Catherine, Refectory Museum of the Cathedral of St. Mary, Pamplona, Spain

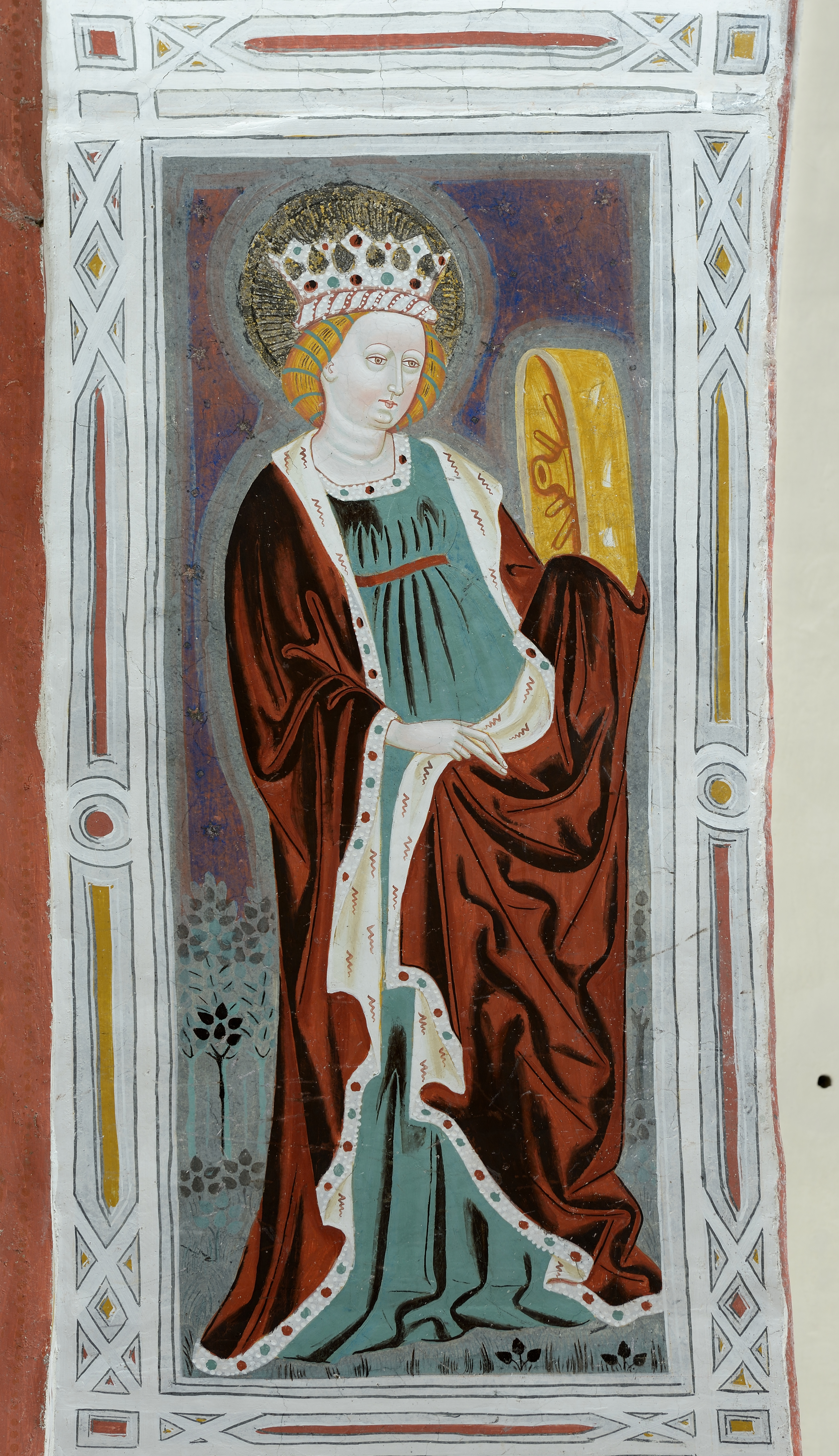
Saint Catherine in a 15th-century fresco on the St. Jacob church in Urtijëi, Italy.

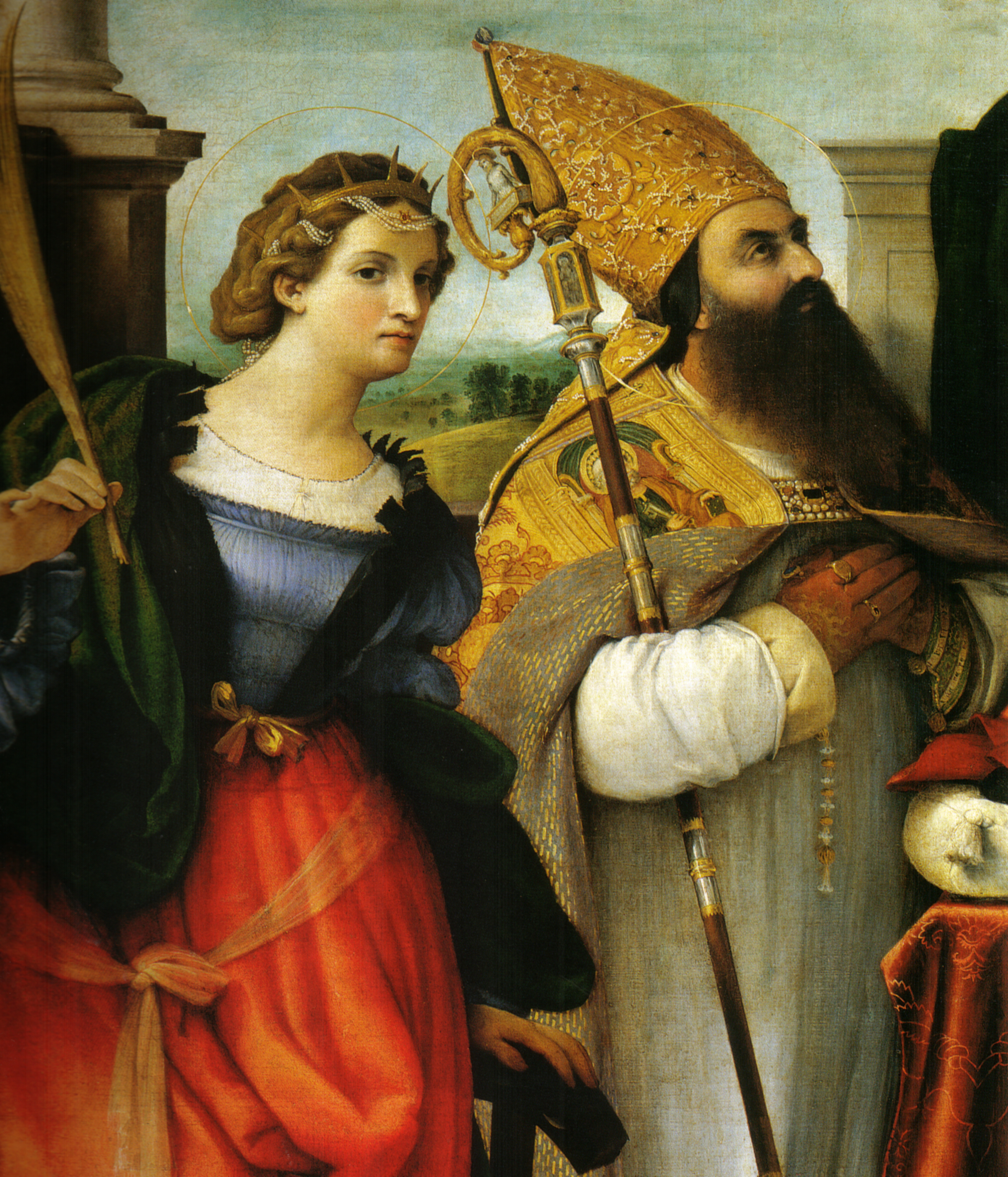
Lorenzo Lotto, Catherine of Alexandria and Saint Augustine

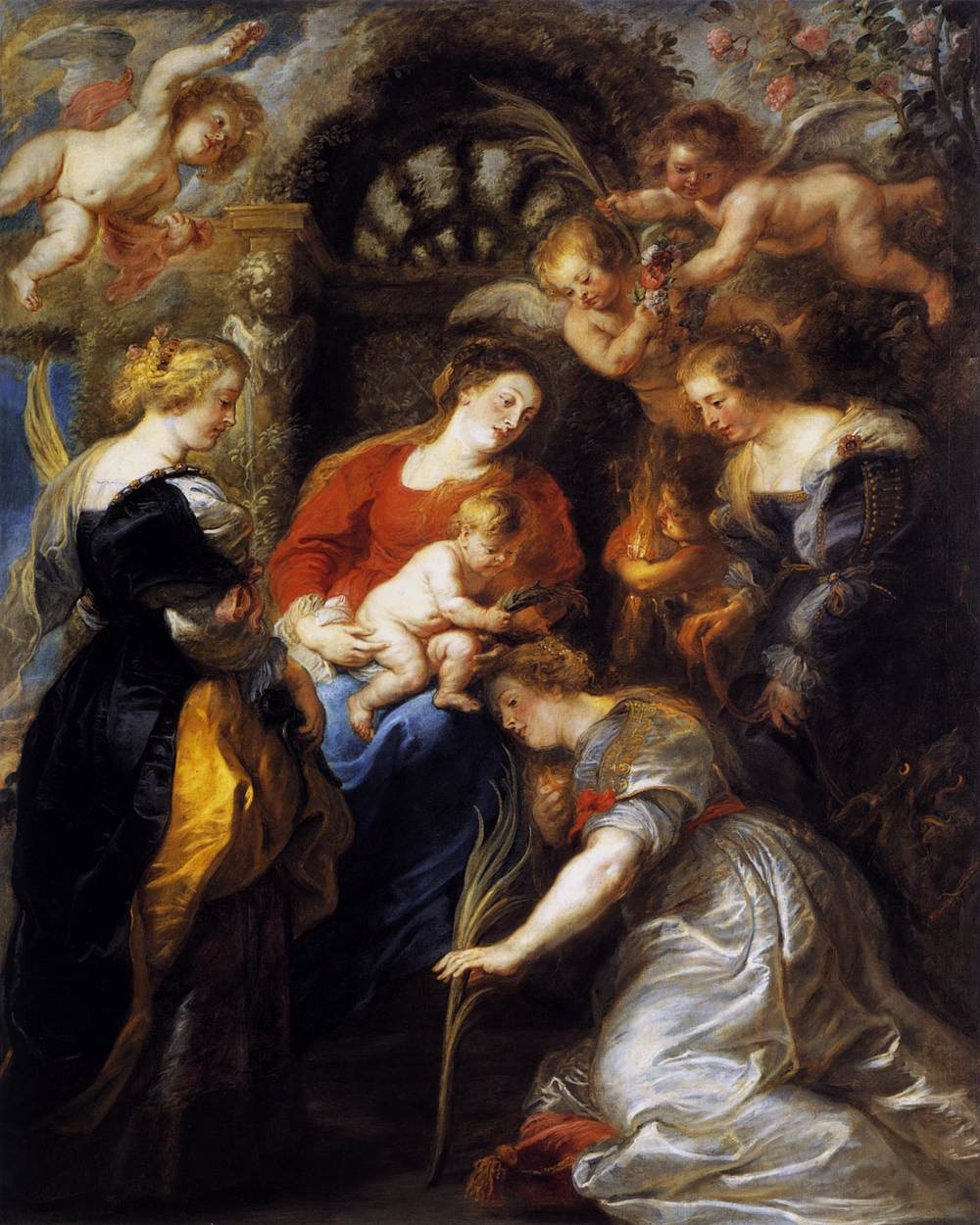
The Crowning of Saint Catherine, by Peter Paul Rubens

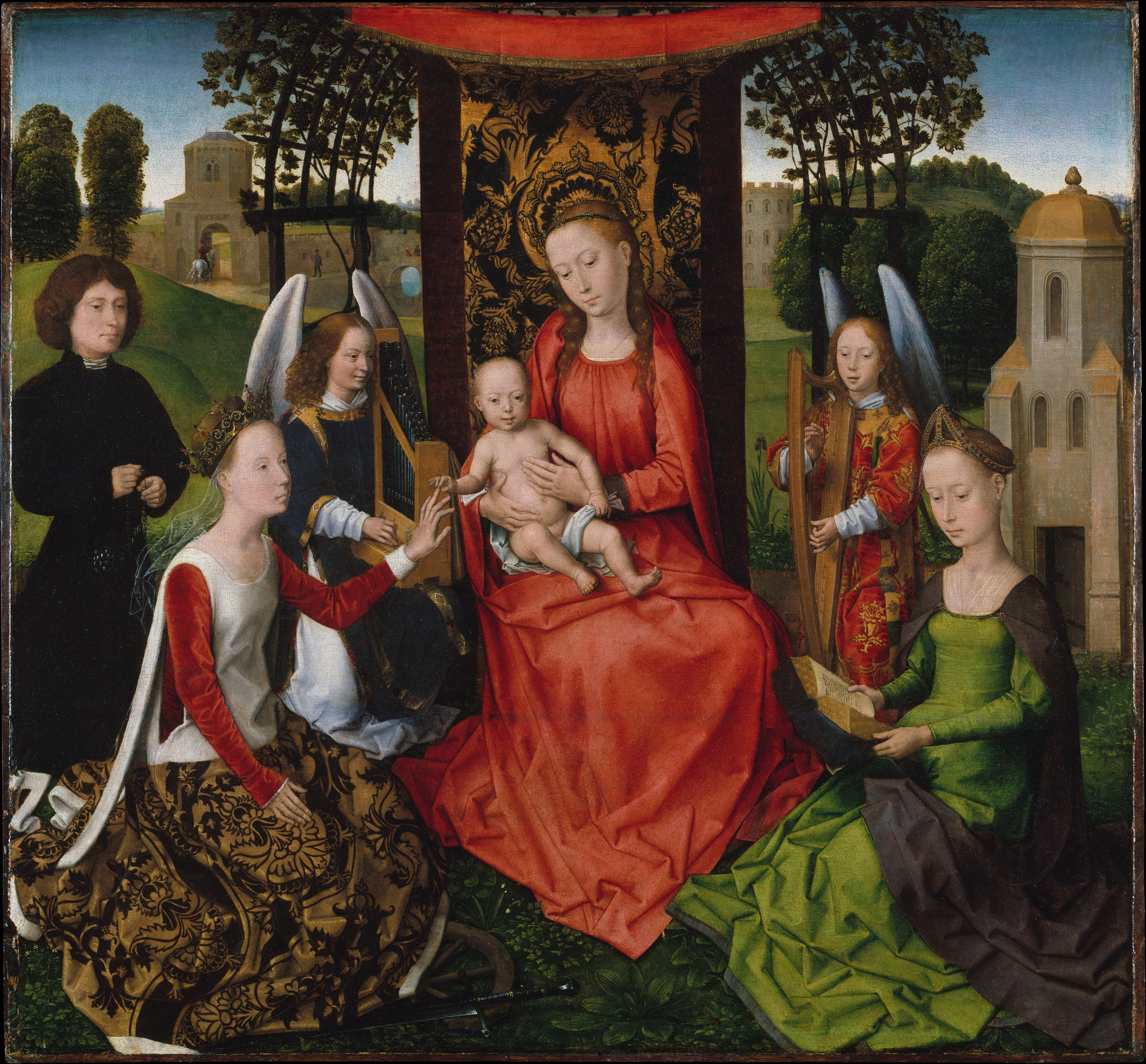
Mystic Marriage of Saint Catherin' (triptych by Hans Memling

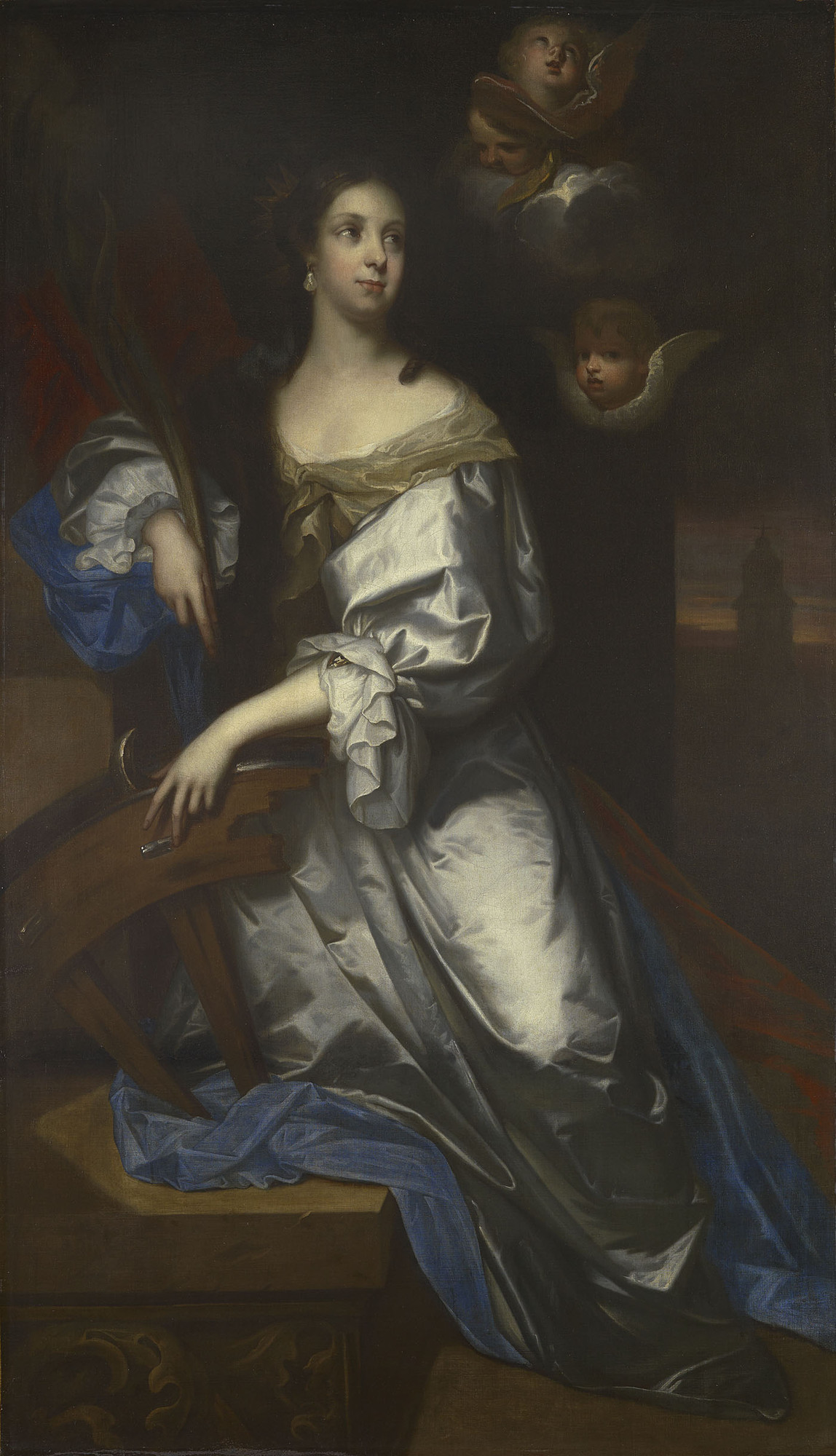
Catherine of Braganza, Queen of England, painted as Catherine of Alexandria - by Jacob Huysmans

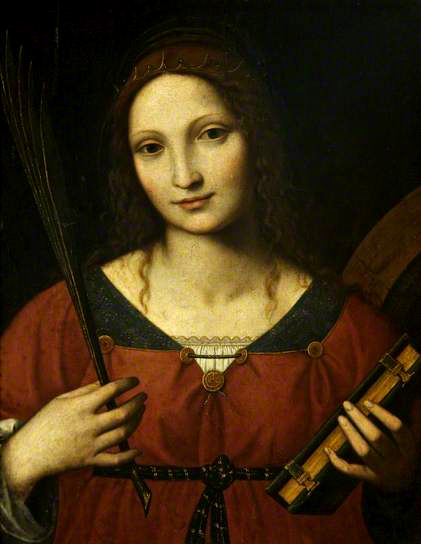
Bernardino Luini - Painting of Catherine of Alexandria, (National Art Museum of Azerbaijan)

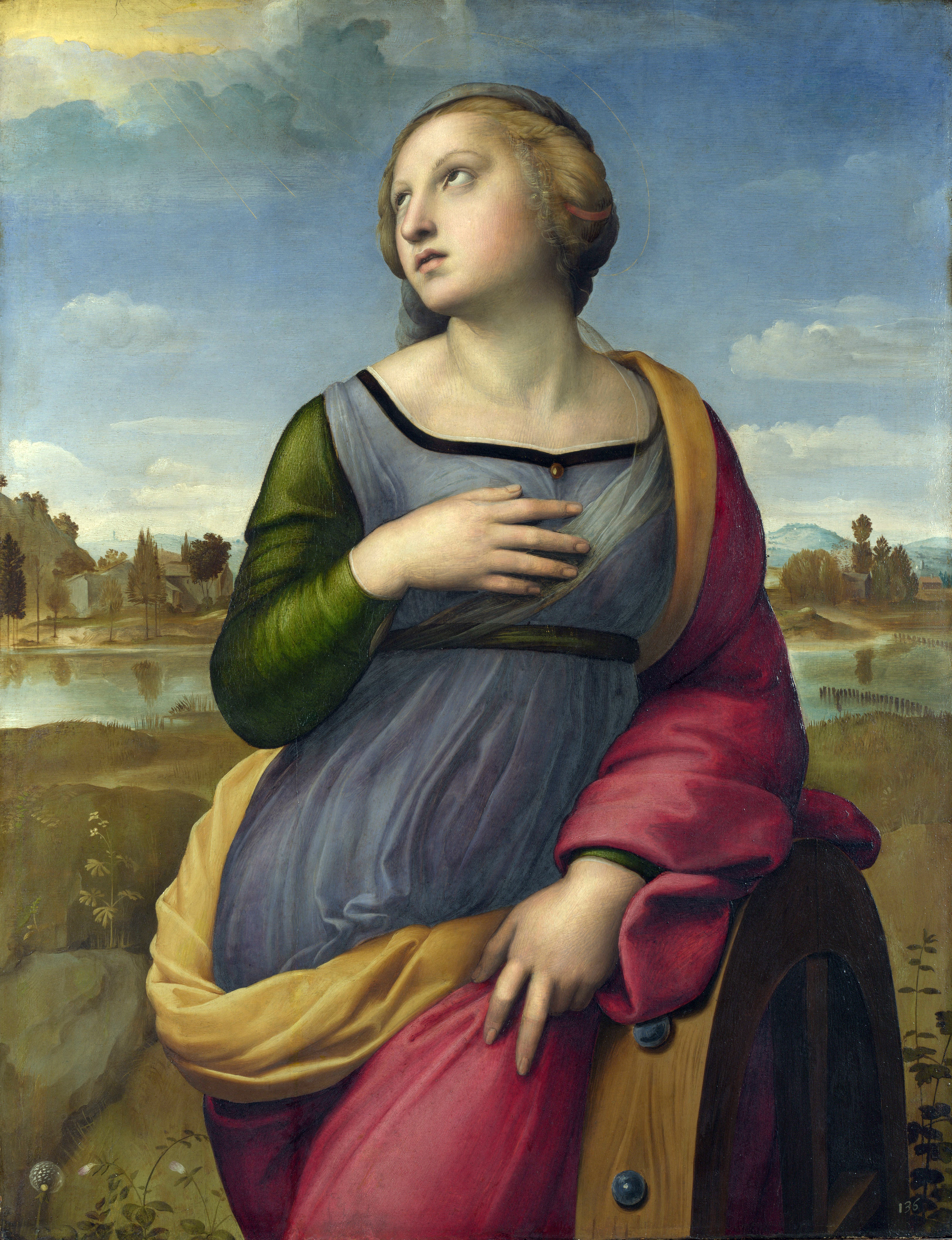
Saint Catherine of Alexandria by Raphael

== See also ==
- Cathedral of St. Catherine, Old Goa
- List of Christian women of the patristic age
- Saint Catherine of Alexandria, patron saint archive
- St. Catherine of Boletice
- St. Catherine's Cathedral, Kherson, dedicated to Saint Catherine; the original name of the city of Kherson was 'the Glory of Catherine'
- St. Catherine's Day
- St. Catherine's taffy
- Order of St. Catherine with Mount Sinai
