= Auergesellschaft =

Company

The industrial firm Auergesellschaft was founded in 1892 with headquarters in Berlin. Up to the end of World War II, Auergesellschaft had manufacturing and research activities in the areas of gas mantles, luminescence, rare earths, radioactivity, and uranium and thorium compounds. In 1934, the corporation was acquired by the German corporation Degussa. In 1939, their Oranienburg plant began the development of industrial-scale, high-purity uranium oxide production. Special Soviet search teams, at the close of World War II, sent Auergesellschaft equipment, material, and staff to the Soviet Union for use in their nuclear weapon project. In 1958 Auergesellschaft merged with the Mine Safety Appliances Corporation, a multinational US corporation. Auergesellschaft became a limited corporation in 1960.

== History ==
The Deutsche Gasglühlicht AG (Degea, German Gas Light Company), was founded in 1892 through the combined efforts of the Jewish entrepreneur and banker Geheimrat (Privy Councillor) Leopold Koppel and the Austrian chemist and inventor Carl Auer von Welsbach. It was the forerunner of Auergesellschaft. Their main research activities, up to the close of World War II, were on gas mantles, Luminescence, rare earths, radioactivity, and on uranium and thorium compounds.

Geheimrat Koppel, who owned Auergesellschaft, was later intimately involved in the financing of and influencing the direction of scientific entities in Germany. Among them were the Kaiser-Wilhelm Gesellschaft (Kaiser Wilhelm Society) and its research institutes. The Third Reich forced Koppel to sell Auergesellschaft, and it was purchased in 1934 by the German corporation Degussa, a large chemical company with extensive experience in the production of metals.

By 1901, Auergesellschaft had their first subsidiaries in Austria, the United States, and England. In 1906, the OSRAM light bulb was developed; its name was formed from the German words OSmium, for the element osmium, and WolfRAM, for the element tungsten. During the WWI the enterprise (like other mine safety companies in Europe and the US) started to manufacture gas masks for the military, and continued with industrial gas masks after that. In 1920, Auergesellschaft, Siemens & Halske, and Allgemeine Elektricitäts-Gesellschaft (AEG) combined their electric lamp production with the formation of the company OSRAM. In 1935, Auergesellschaft developed the luminescent light.

Their Oranienburg plant, 15 miles (24 km) northeast of Berlin, was constructed in 1926, and their Auer-Glaswerke was constructed in 1938.

In 1958 Auergesellschaft merged with American Mine Safety Appliances Corporation; Auergesellschaft became a limited corporation in 1960 and is now known as MSA Auer.

=== Nikolaus Riehl ===
Nikolaus Riehl received his doctorate in nuclear chemistry from the University of Berlin in 1927, under the guidance of the nuclear physicist Lise Meitner and the nuclear chemist Otto Hahn. He initially took a position with Auergesellschaft, where he became an authority on luminescence. While he completed his Habilitation, he continued his industrial career at Auergesellschaft, as opposed to working in academia. From 1927, he was a staff scientist in the radiology department. From 1937, he was head of the optical engineering department. From 1939 to 1945, he was the director of the scientific headquarters.

Auergesellschaft had a substantial amount of “waste” uranium from which it had extracted radium. After reading a June 1939 paper by Siegfried Flügge on the technical use of nuclear energy from uranium, Riehl recognized a business opportunity for the company, and, in July of that year, he went to the Heereswaffenamt (HWA, Army Ordnance Office) to discuss the production of uranium. The HWA was interested.

=== Oranienburg Plant ===
With the interest of the HWA, Riehl, and his colleague Günter Wirths, set up an industrial-scale production of high-purity uranium oxide at the Auergesellschaft plant in Oranienburg. Adding to the capabilities in the final stages of metallic uranium production were the strengths of the Degussa corporation's capabilities in metals production.

The Auer Oranienburg plant provided the uranium sheets and cubes for the Uranmaschine (uranium machine, i.e., nuclear reactor) experiments conducted at the Kaiser-Wilhelm Gesellschaft’s Institut für Physik (KWIP, Kaiser Wilhelm Institute of Physics) and the Versuchsstelle (testing station) of the Heereswaffenamt (Army Ordnance Office) in Gottow, under the German nuclear energy project Uranverein. The G-1 experiment performed at the HWA testing station, under the direction of Kurt Diebner, had lattices of 6,800 uranium oxide cubes (about 25 tons), in the nuclear moderator paraffin.

=== Russian Alsos ===
Near the close of World War II, as American, British, and Russian military forces were closing in on Berlin, Riehl and some of his staff moved to a village west of Berlin, to try to assure occupation by British or American forces. In mid-May 1945, with the assistance of Riehl's colleague Karl Günter Zimmer, Russian nuclear physicists Georgy Flerov and Lev Artsimovich arrived one day in NKVD colonel's uniforms. The use of Russian nuclear physicists in the wake of Soviet troop advances to identify and “requisition” equipment, materiel, intellectual property and personnel useful to the Russian atomic bomb project is similar to the American Operation Alsos. The military head of Alsos was Lt. Col. Boris Pash, former head of security on the American atomic bomb effort, the Manhattan Project, and its chief scientist was the eminent physicist Samuel Goudsmit. In early 1945, the Soviets initiated an effort similar to Alsos (Russian Alsos). Forty out of fewer than 100 Russian scientists from the Soviet atomic bomb project's Laboratory No. 2 went to Germany, Austria, and Czechoslovakia in support of acquisitions for the project.

The two colonels requested that Riehl join them in Berlin for a few days, where he also met with nuclear physicist Yulii Borisovich Khariton, also in the uniform of an NKVD colonel. This sojourn in Berlin became 10 years in the Soviet Union. Riehl and his staff, including their families, were flown to Moscow on 9 July 1945. Flying Riehl and his staff to Russia demonstrates the importance the Soviets placed on the production of uranium in their atomic bomb project. Eventually, Riehl's entire laboratory was dismantled and transported to the Soviet Union. The dismantling of his laboratory began even while Riehl was being held by the Soviets in Berlin.

Work of the American Operation Alsos teams, in November 1944, uncovered leads which took them to a company in Paris that handled rare earths and had been taken over by the Auergesellschaft. This, combined with information gathered in the same month through an Alsos team in Strasbourg, confirmed that the Auergesellschaft Oranienburg plant was involved in the production of uranium and thorium metals. Since the plant was to be in the future Soviet zone of occupation and the Russian troops would arrive there before the Allies, General Leslie Groves, commander of the Manhattan Project, recommended to General George Marshall that the plant be destroyed by aerial bombardment to deny its uranium production equipment to the Russians. On Thursday, 15 March 1945, 612 B-17 Flying Fortress bombers of the Eighth Air Force, carrying out "Mission 889", dropped 1,506 tons of high-explosive and 178 tons of incendiary bombs on the plant, apparently classified as a "German Army HQ" as the target in official USAAF records of the time. Riehl visited the site with the Russians and said that the facility was mostly destroyed. Riehl also recalled long after the war that the Russians knew precisely why the Americans had bombed the facility – the attack had been directed at them rather than the Germans.

When a Soviet search team arrived at the Auergesellschaft facility in Oranienburg, they found nearly 100 tons of fairly pure uranium oxide. The Soviet Union took this uranium as reparations, which amounted to between 25% and 40% of the uranium taken from Germany and Czechoslovakia at the end of the war. Khariton said the uranium found there saved the Soviet Union a year on its atomic bomb project.

== Bibliography ==
- Bernstein, Jeremy Hitler’s Uranium Club: The Secret Recordings at Farm Hall (Copernicus, 2001) ISBN 0-387-95089-3
- Groves, Leslie M. Now it Can be Told: The Story of the Manhattan Project (De Capo, 1962) ISBN 0-306-80189-2
- Hentschel, Klaus (editor) and Ann M. Hentschel (editorial assistant and translator) Physics and National Socialism: An Anthology of Primary Sources (Birkhäuser, 1996) ISBN 0-8176-5312-0
- Holloway, David Stalin and the Bomb: The Soviet Union and Atomic Energy 1939–1956 (Yale, 1994) ISBN 0-300-06056-4
- Maddrell, Paul "Spying on Science: Western Intelligence in Divided Germany 1945–1961" (Oxford, 2006) ISBN 0-19-926750-2
- Macrakis, Kristie "Surviving the Swastika: Scientific Research in Nazi Germany" (Oxford, 1993)
- Naimark, Norman M. The Russians in Germany: A History of the Soviet Zone of Occupation, 1945-1949 (Belknap, 1995)
- Oleynikov, Pavel V. German Scientists in the Soviet Atomic Project, The Nonproliferation Review Volume 7, Number 2, 1 – 30 (2000). The author has been a group leader at the Institute of Technical Physics of the Russian Federal Nuclear Center in Snezhinsk (Chelyabinsk-70).
- Riehl, Nikolaus and Frederick Seitz Stalin’s Captive: Nikolaus Riehl and the Soviet Race for the Bomb (American Chemical Society and the Chemical Heritage Foundations, 1996) ISBN 0-8412-3310-1.
- Walker, Mark German National Socialism and the Quest for Nuclear Power 1939–1949 (Cambridge, 1993) ISBN 0-521-43804-7
