= The Crowning of Saint Catherine =

Painting by Peter Paul Rubens

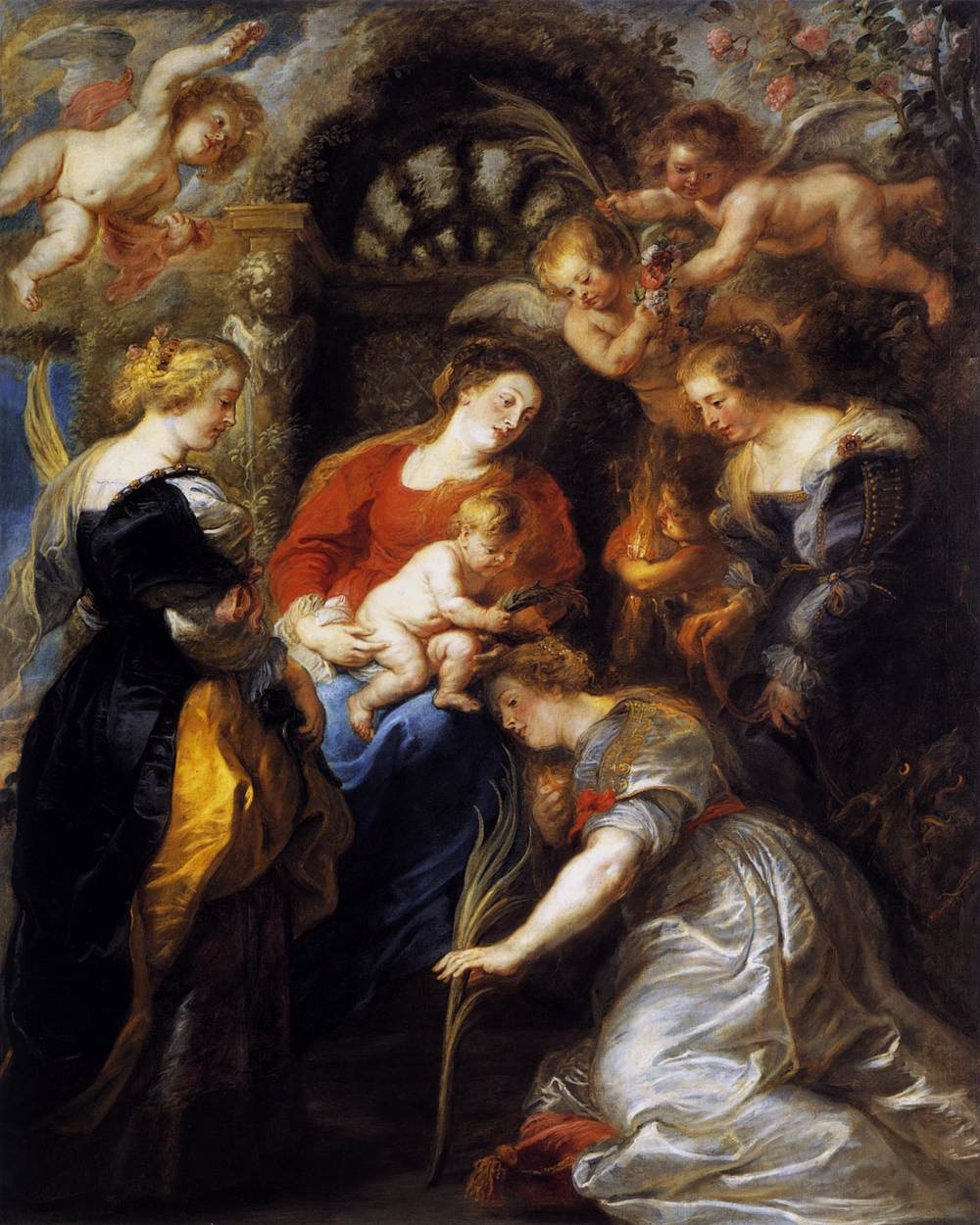
The Crowning of Saint Catherine (1631) by Peter Paul Rubens

The Crowning of Saint Catherine is an oil-on-canvas painting by Peter Paul Rubens, now in the Toledo Museum of Art. It portrays Catherine of Alexandria, an early-4th-century martyr, being crowned by the infant Jesus, sitting on his mother's lap.

Rubens originally painted it for the church of the Augustinians in Mechelen (Malines) where it was installed in 1631. In the eighteenth century, the church authorities sold it to a dealer; in 1779, it was purchased by John Manners, 5th Duke of Rutland. It remained as part of the Rutland estate until 1911 when the 8th Duke of Rutland sold it to the German-Jewish banker and science entrepreneur Leopold Koppel.

On Koppel's death in 1933, it was stolen by senior Nazi Hermann Göring for his private collection. At the end of World War II it was discovered by American troops in a salt mine and was eventually reclaimed, with several other paintings, by Leopold's son Albert, who sold it to its present owner in 1950. This makes the painting one of 360 objects in the Toledo Museum of Art's collection that changed hands in Continental Europe during the Nazi era (1933–1945), according to the American Alliance of Museums Nazi-Era Provenance Internet Portal.
