= Marthe Cosnard =

- Born: 14 April 1614; Sées
- Died: After 1659
- Occupations: Writer, playwright

Marthe Cosnard, baptised in Sées on 14 April 1614 and died after 1659, was a 17th-century French playwright. She wrote a Christian tragedy entitled les Chastes Martyrs. She was a member of the "Cercle des femmes savantes" of Jean de la Forge who nicknamed her Kandake. Her choice to remain a virgin earned also her the title of "Our Lady of Sees" in her lifetime.

Coming from a family whose members exercised various professions - lawyers, goldsmiths, apothecaries, doctors - from the 15th century, she was raised in an environment where the theater was particularly honored. In 1650, aged 36, she brought out her tragedy under the patronage of Pierre Corneille whom she probably frequented. The playwright paid her a tribute ending with the lines:

Ne te lasse donc point d’enfanter des merveilles,
De prêter ton exemple à conduire nos veilles,
Et d’aplanir à ceux qui l’auront imité,
Les illustres chemins à l’immortalité.

Cosnard's play was dedicated to Anne of Austria, the wife of King Louis XIII. The subject was borrowed from a Christian novel by Jean-Pierre Camus, the Agatonphile, which would also inspire the first play by Françoise Pascal in 1655. According to Léon de La Sicotière, the influence of Polyeucte, published in 1641, is undeniable. The play, which probably wasn't presented, was repeatedly printed or counterfeit, indicating a "very successful reading and selling".

Other plays have been attributed to Marthe Cosnard but without convincing evidence: Les filles généreuses - undated, le martyre de Saint Eustache - 1643 and le martyre de Sainte Catherine - 1649. On the other side, it would be proved that she is the author of the collection of short pieces La grande Bible renouvelée, wrongly attributed to Françoise Pascal.
