= Leopold Koppel =

German banker and entrepreneur

Geheimrat Leopold Koppel (20 October 1843 in Dresden – 29 August 1933 in Berlin) was a German banker and entrepreneur. He founded the private banking house Koppel und Co., the industrial firms Auergesellschaft and OSRAM, and the philanthropic foundation the Koppel-Stiftung. He was a Senator in the Kaiser-Wilhelm-Gesellschaft. An endowment he made in 1911 resulted in the founding of the Kaiser-Wilhelm Institut für physikalische Chemie und Elektrochemie, and endowments from him led to the founding of and support of the Kaiser-Wilhelm Institut für Physik. As a Jew, he was a target of the Third Reich’s policy of Arisierung – the Aryanization of German businesses, which began in 1933.

== Career ==
Koppel was a Jewish banker, art collector and entrepreneur. In recognition of his contributions to German commerce, he was given the title Geheimer Kommerzienrat (Privy Councillor of Commerce), or, in short, Geheimrat.

In 1890, Koppel opened his private banking house Koppel und Co.

In 1892, with the Austrian chemist and inventor Carl Auer von Welsbach, Koppel founded the Deutsche Gasglühlichtgesellschaft-Aktiengesellschaft (Degea or DGA, German Gas Light Company), the forerunner of Auergesellschaft. Koppel was the controlling owner. In 1906, DGA developed the OSRAM light bulb; its name was formed from the German words OSmium, for the element osmium, and WolfRAM, for the element tungsten. As the owner of the OSRAM trademark, Koppel separated the light bulb manufacturing from DGA in 1918, forming the OSRAM Werke GmbH, after which the new company was converted into a Kommanditgesellschaft (limited partnership), with DGA as the limited partner. Since Koppel was the majority shareholder in DGA, he thus became the chief partner in the new company. In February 1920, DGA merged its light bulb manufacturing with that of Allgemeine Elektrizitäts-Gesellschaft (AEG) and Siemens & Halske and they became limited partners under OSRAM G.m.b.H. KG; the start of the business year was dated retroactively to 1 July 1919. Koppel (DGA) owned 20% of the OSRAM G.m.b.H. KG stock, and the other two companies each owned 40%.

In 1905, Koppel established the Koppel-Stiftung zur Förderung der geistigen Beziehungen Deutschlands zum Ausland (Koppel Foundation for the Promotion of Scientific Relations Abroad). Through this foundation, he promoted German scientific research and development, which in turn benefited German industry and manufacturing.

The Kaiser-Wilhelm-Gesellschaft (KWG, Kaiser Wilhelm Society) was founded in 1911 to promote the sciences in Germany, especially by establishing research institutions under its umbrella; after World War II, the organization was renamed the Max-Planck-Gesellschaft, in honor of Max Planck. That same year, the Koppel-Stiftung contributed an endowment of 1 million Marks towards the founding of the Kaiser-Wilhelm Institut für physikalische Chemie und Elektrochemie (KWIPC, Kaiser Wilhelm Institute for Physical Chemistry and Elektrochemistry) in Berlin-Dahlem. The endowment was given with Koppel’s condition that its director be the Jewish chemist and Nobel Laureate Fritz Haber; Haber was director from then until 1933; after World War II, the Institute was renamed the Fritz-Haber-Institut der Max-Planck-Gesellschaft.

From 1913, the Koppel-Stiftung donated money for the salary of Albert Einstein at the Preußische Akademie der Wissenschaften (Prussian Academy of Sciences) so that Einstein would not be required to teach and be able to focus his attention on theoretical research. This supplemental salary was continued for 13 years, and it was instrumental in the founding of the Kaiser-Wilhelm Institut für Physik (KWIP, Kaiser Wilhelm Institute for Physics).

The Kaiser-Wilhelm-Gesellschaft had a Senat (Senate, i.e., supervisory board) composed of members from fields including finance, industry, science, and politics. Koppel was a Senator of the KWG from 1921 to 1933.

When Adolf Hitler came to power in 1933, the Third Reich initiated Arisierung, a policy of Aryanization of German businesses. As a consequence of this, Koppel was forced to divest himself of Auergesellschaft and his banking house. The German corporation Degussa took control of Auergesellschaft in 1934; Degussa was a large chemical company with extensive experience in the production of metals.

Koppel had an art collection which included The Crowning of Saint Catherine which was looted by the Nazis.

== Bibliography ==
- Clark, Ronald W. Einstein: The Life and Times (World, 1971)
- Hentschel, Klaus (editor) and Ann M. Hentschel (editorial assistant and translator) Physics and National Socialism: An Anthology of Primary Sources (Birkhäuser, 1996) ISBN 0-8176-5312-0
- Kreutzmüller, Christoph Zum Umgang der Kaiser-Wilhelm-Gesellschaft mit Geld und Gut: Immobilientransfers und jüdische Stiftungen 1933–1945 (KWG, 2005)
- Macrakis, Kristie Surviving the Swastika: Scientific Research in Nazi Germany (Oxford, 1993) ISBN 0-19-507010-0
- Riehl, Nikolaus and Frederick Seitz Stalin’s Captive: Nikolaus Riehl and the Soviet Race for the Bomb (American Chemical Society and the Chemical Heritage Foundations, 1996) ISBN 0-8412-3310-1
