= Françoise Pascal (poet) =

Françoise Pascal (Lyon, baptised 18 February 1632 – Paris, after 1698) was a 17th-century French poet, painter, playwright and lyricist.

The daughter of a customs employee who became a guard to Marshall de Villeroy, the city governor, Françoise Pascal served the prestigious Neufville de Villeroy family. She became known for her poems, paintings (now lost) and especially her theater plays.

She was the first woman known to date, whose dramatic work has been performed by professional companies. She settled in Paris around 1667, perhaps to attempt a theatrical career on the stages of the capital, but apparently without success. She then evolved in some salons of the French capital, composing the lyrics of musical and religious works.

== Works ==
- 1655: Agathonphile Martyr, Lyon, C. Petit.
- 1657: Diverses poésies, Lyon, Simon Matheret.
- 1657: Endymion, Lyon, C. Petit.
- 1661: Sésostris, Lyon, A. Offray.
- 1664: Le Vieillard amoureux, Lyon, A. Offray.
- 1669: Le Commerce du Parnasse, Paris, C. Barbin.
- 1670: Cantiques spirituels ou Noëls nouveaux, sur la naissance du Sauveur, Paris, N. Oudot.
- 1674: Les Réflexions de la Madeleine dans le temps de sa pénitence, Paris, M. Coustelier.
- 1680: Les Entretiens de la Vierge et de Saint Jean l’Évangéliste sur la vie et la mort du Sauveur, Paris, Veuve S. Huré.

== Modern editions ==
- L’Amoureux extravagant, L’Amoureuse vaine et ridicule, Sésostris, Le Vieillard amoureux, éd. Deborah Steinberger, dans Théâtre de femmes, XVIIe siècle, dir. A. Evain, P. Gethner & H. Goldwyn, vol.2, Saint-Étienne, Publications de l’Université de Saint-Étienne, 2008.
- Le Commerce du Parnasse, éd. Deborah Steinberger, Exeter, University of Exeter Press, 2001.
