= Heis =

Heis may refer to:

- Eduard Heis (1806–1877), German mathematician and astronomer
- Heis (album), a 2024 album by Rema
- Heis (Chronicles), a 2017 French film directed by Anaïs Volpé
- Heis (crater), a lunar impact crater
- Heis (town), a town in Sanaag, Somaliland
