= Boris (crater) =

Lunar impact crater

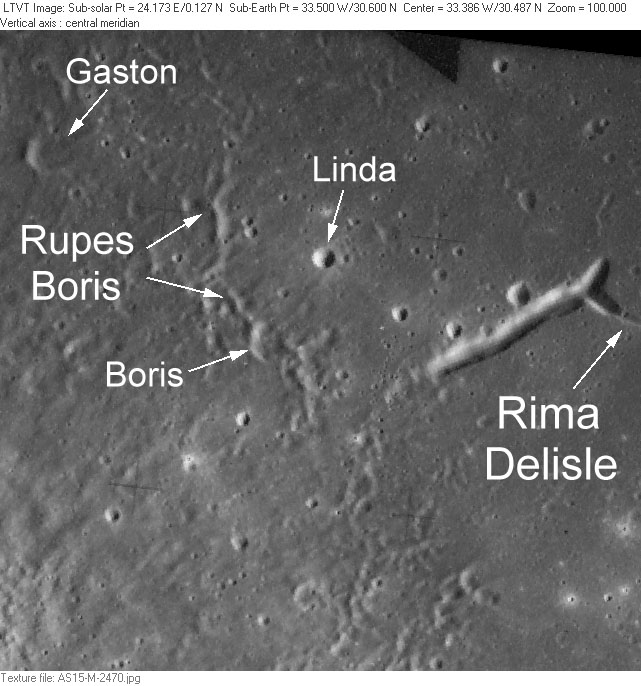
- Boris and surroundings
- Coordinates: 30.53°N 33.50°W
- Diameter: 1.73 km (1.07 mi)
- Colongitude: 34° at sunrise
- Eponym: Boris (a common Russian masculine name)

Boris is a tiny lunar impact crater that is located on the Mare Imbrium, to the northeast of the much larger crater Delisle. It lies near the southwest extremity of a sinuous rille that is designated Rima Delisle. This rille meanders to the northeast, towards the crater Heis, before vanishing into the lunar mare. The name Boris is a common Russian male given name; the crater is not named after a specific person. Its designation was officially adopted by the International Astronomical Union in 1979.

== See also ==
- Borya (crater) - a crater named after the diminutive form of Boris
