= Fedorov (crater) =

Crater on the Moon

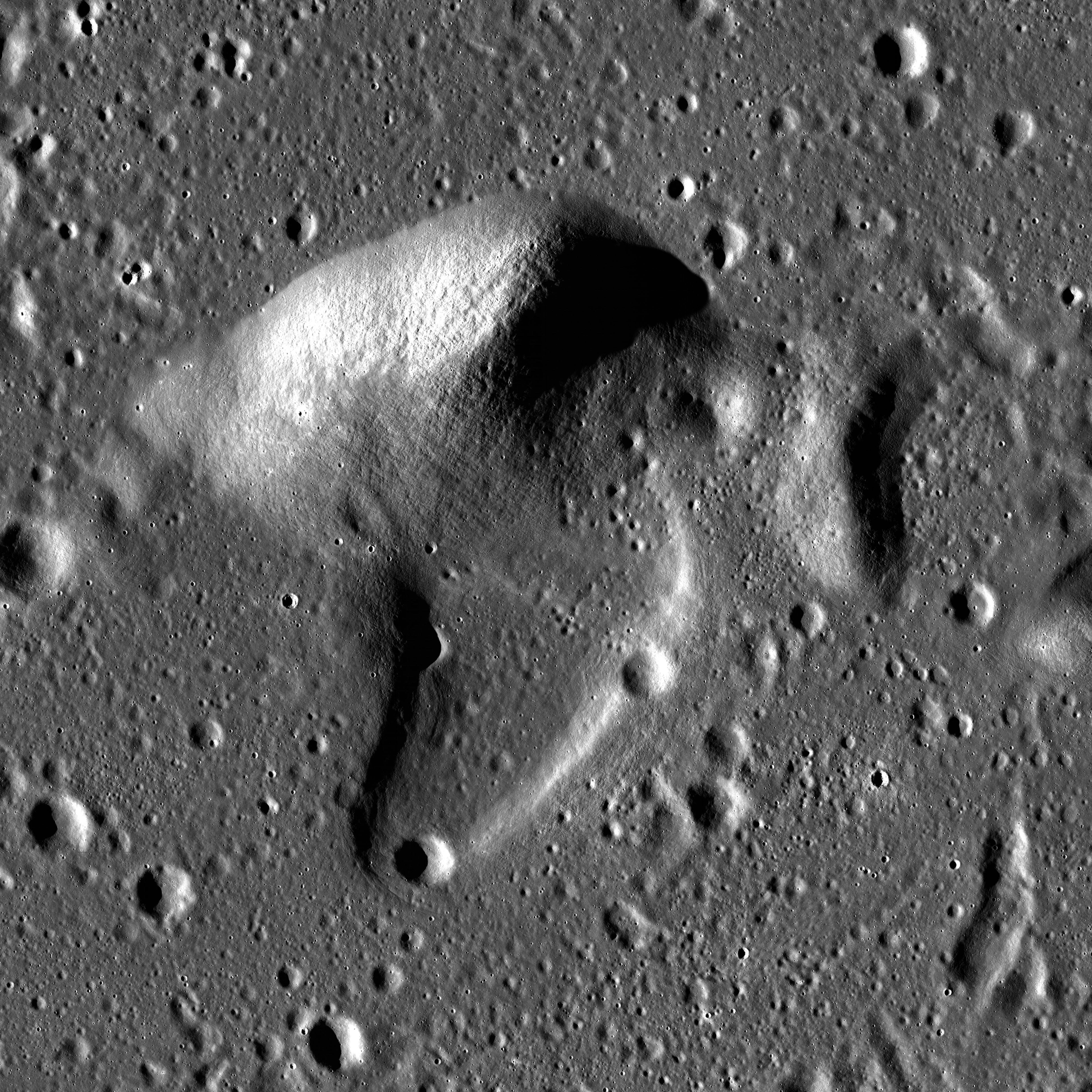
- Lunar Reconnaissance Orbiter image
- Coordinates: 28.23°N 37.05°W
- Diameter: 6.08 km (3.78 mi)
- Depth: Unknown
- Colongitude: 37° at sunrise
- Eponym: Aleksandr Petrovich Fedorov

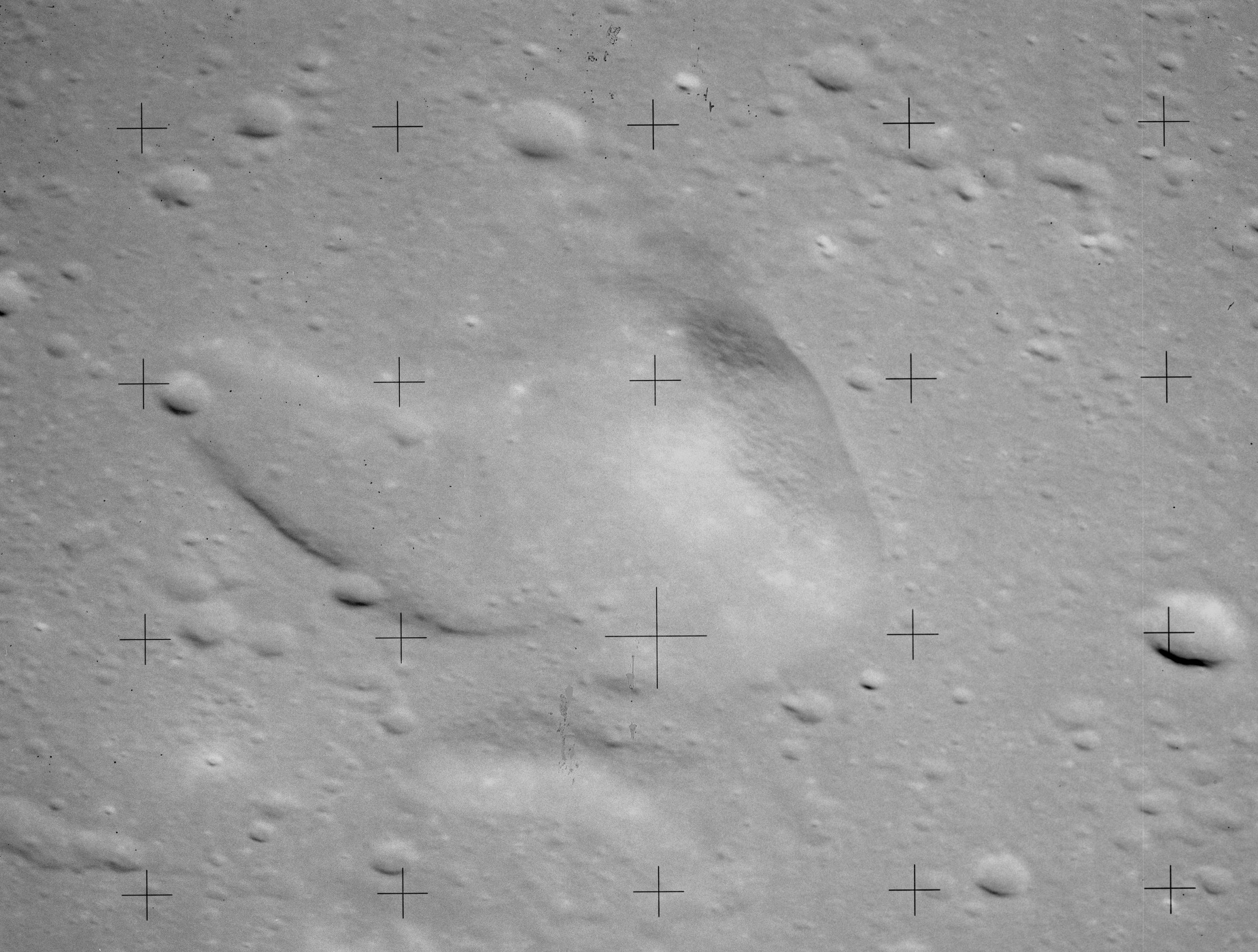
Oblique view from Apollo 15

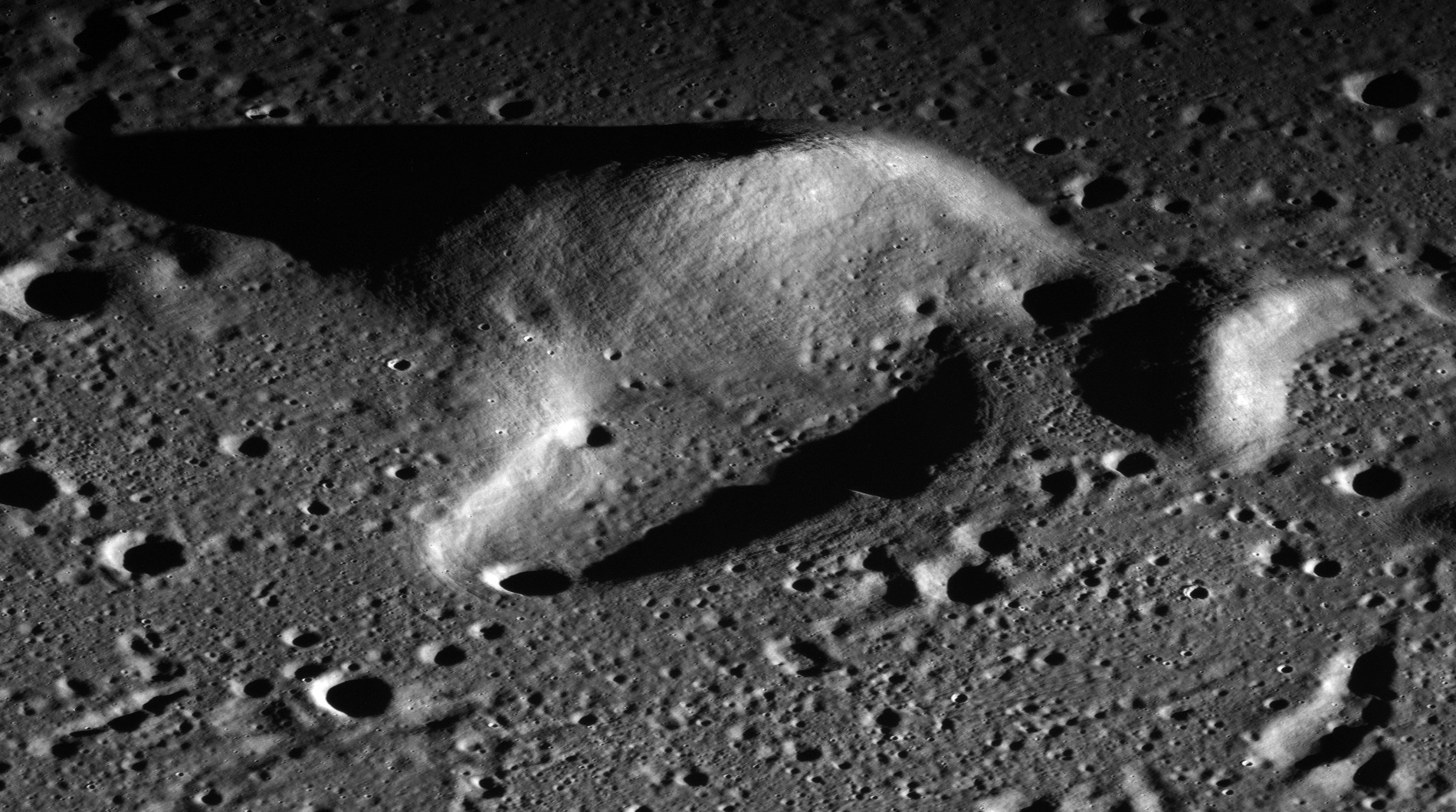
Oblique view from Apollo 17

Fedorov is a lunar geologic feature ("crater" in IAU nomenclature) located in the western Mare Imbrium. It lies east-northeast of the crater Diophantus, and southeast of Delisle. About 20 kilometers to the south-southeast is the slightly larger formation of Artsimovich.

This feature is slightly elongated and oddly shaped. It is most likely an endogenic mare crater. There is a ridge on the north side that is 6 km around and rises about 0.8 km above the surrounding lunar mare. This ridge displays a surprisingly high thorium abundance, one of the highest on the Moon.

This formation is named after Russian rocket scientist Aleksandr Petrovich Fedorov (1872-1920). Its designation was officially adopted by the International Astronomical Union in 1979.
