= Artsimovich (crater) =

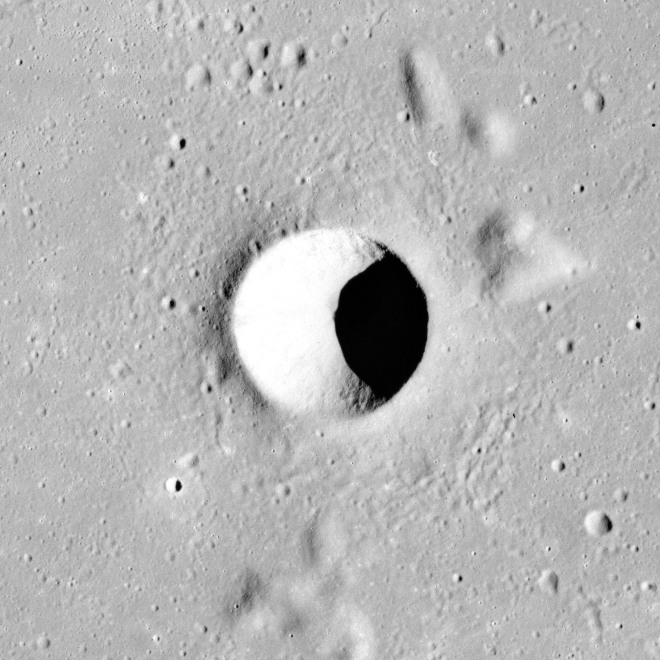
- Apollo 15 image
- Coordinates: 27.61°N 36.63°W
- Diameter: 7.96 km (4.95 mi)
- Depth: 2.0 km (1.2 mi)
- Colongitude: 37° at sunrise
- Eponym: Lev A. Artsimovich

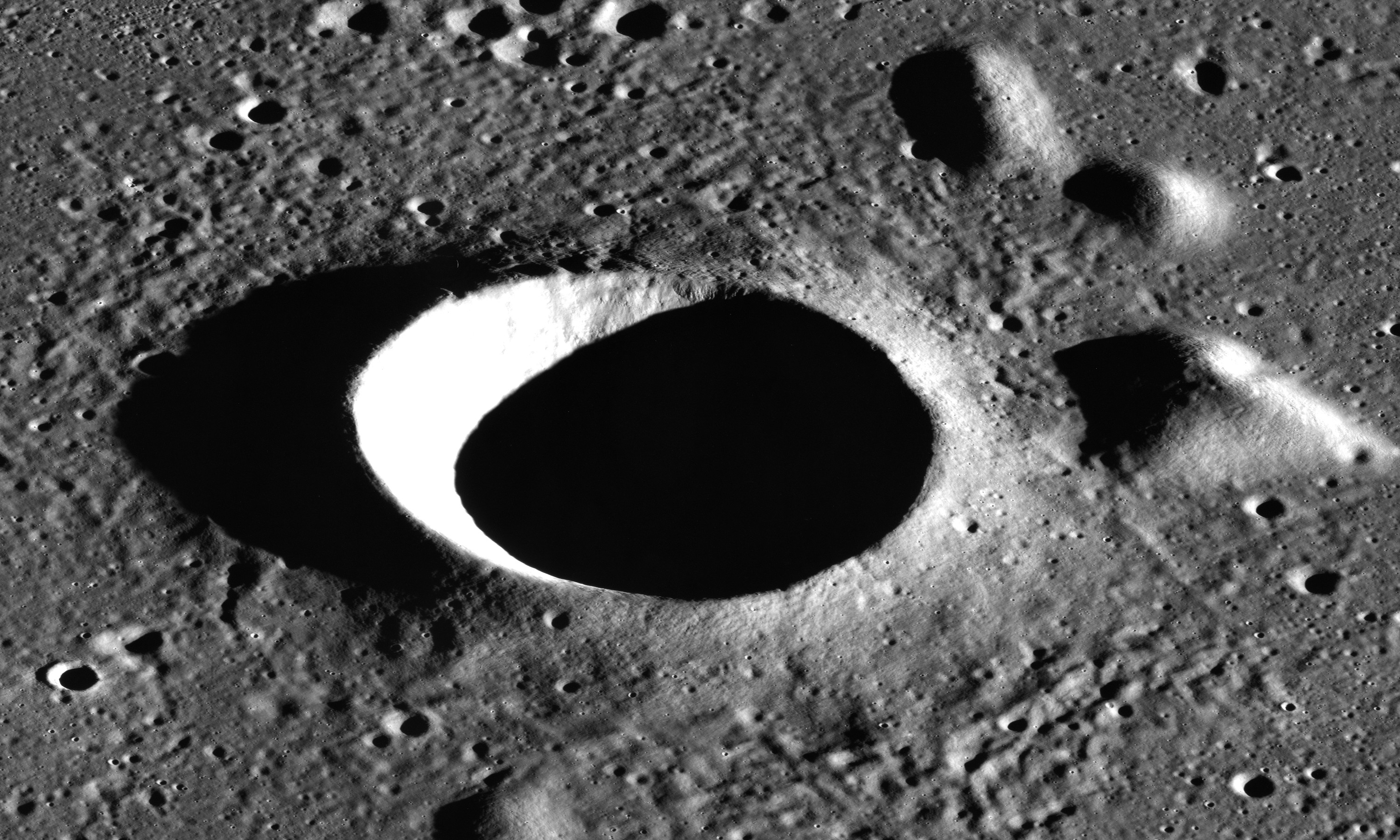
Oblique view from Apollo 17

Artsimovich is a small lunar impact crater located in the western Mare Imbrium of the Earth's Moon. This is a circular crater forming a cup-shaped excavation in the surface of the lunar mare. It was named after Soviet physicist Lev A. Artsimovich (1909–1973) in 1973. This crater was identified as Diophantus A before being named by the International Astronomical Union.

To the east is the crater Diophantus and to the northeast lies Delisle. Less than 20 kilometers to the north-northeast is the tiny Fedorov. Due south is the wrinkle ridge Dorsum Arduino. There are a pair of lunar domes to the southwest of Artsimovich, both with diameters over 20 km and heights of around 100 m.
