= C. Herschel (crater) =

Lunar crater

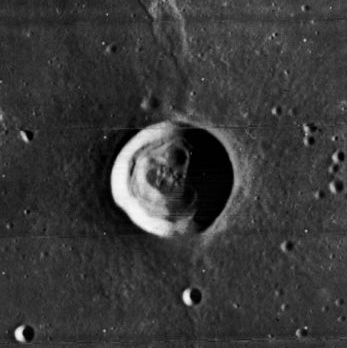
- Lunar Orbiter 4 image
- Coordinates: 34.5°N 31.2°W
- Diameter: 13.70 km (8.51 mi)
- Depth: 1.9 km (1.2 mi)
- Colongitude: 31° at sunrise
- Formation: Eratosthenian
- Eponym: Caroline Herschel

C. Herschel is a small lunar impact crater that lies on the western part of Mare Imbrium. It is a circular, bowl-shaped formation that has not undergone significant erosion. The interior floor has the same low albedo as the surrounding lunar mare. The bright walls and isolated location of this crater make it a conspicuous feature. To the south-southwest is the similar crater Heis. C. Herschel lies on a wrinkle ridge of the lunar mare named the Dorsum Heim.

This formation is named after German astronomer Caroline Herschel (1750-1848), the younger sister and scientific collaborator of William Herschel. Her name was introduced into lunar nomenclature by amateur selenographers William R. Birt and John Lee in the nineteenth century. Its designation was formally adopted by the International Astronomical Union in 1935.

== Satellite craters ==
By convention these features are identified on lunar maps by placing the letter on the side of the crater midpoint that is closest to C. Herschel.

C. Herschel	Latitude	Longitude	Diameter
C	37.2° N	32.5° W	7 km
E	34.2° N	34.7° W	5 km
U	36.2° N	31.5° W	3 km
V	36.4° N	33.5° W	4 km

== Gallery ==
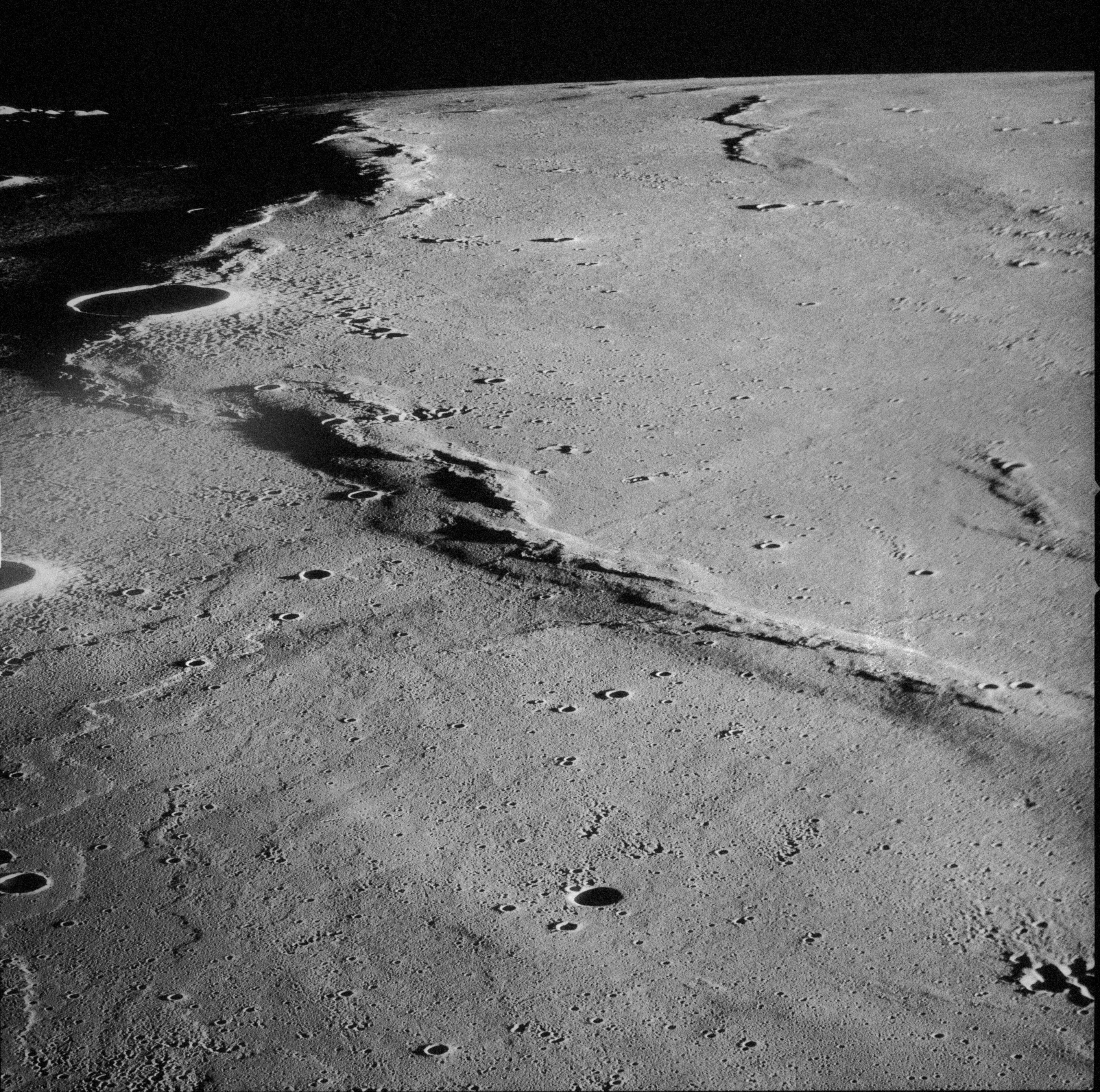
C. Herschel (upper left) cuts across the wrinkle ridge Dorsum Heim in this oblique view from Apollo 17

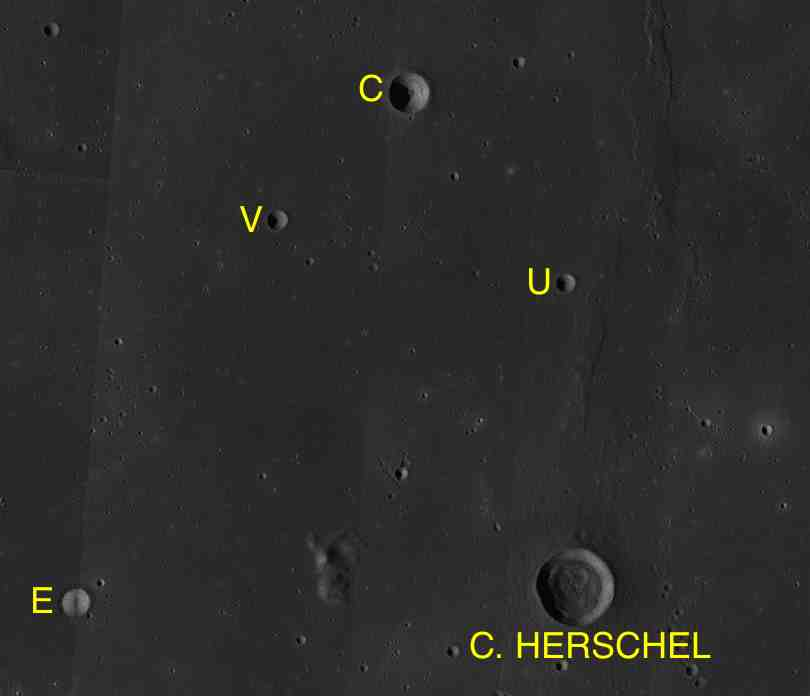
Satellite craters of C. Herschel
