= Ninel Artsimovich =

Russian Immunologist (1927–2023)

- Born: Ninel Georgievna; 29 January 1927; Bandar-e Anzali, Qajar Iran
- Died: 2 May 2023 (aged 96); Moscow, Russia
- Resting place: Novodevichy Cemetery
- Education: Moscow State Pedagogical University
- Spouse: Lev Artsimovich
- Awards: Honored Scientist of the RSFSR; Excellence in Health Care (USSR).
- Scientific career
- Fields: immunology

Ninel Grigoryevna Artsimovich also transliterated Arzimowitsch (29 January 1927, Bandar-e Anzali, Gilian – 2 May 2023, Moscow) was a Soviet, Russian professor, doctor of medicine and immunology. She received the award of Honored Scientist of the RSFSR (1990). Her husband was Lev Artsimovich.

== Academic background and works ==
Nelli Georgievna Artsimovich was a graduate of the First Moscow State Medical University. After that, she worked as a surgeon and head of the surgery department from 1949–1959. From 1959 she was at the Institute of Experimental Biology of the Academy of Medical Sciences of the USSR, and in 1973–1985. She was also the head of the laboratory of the BIHS research institute in 1985–2003, the head of the laboratory of immunomodulation at the Institute of Immunology of the Ministry of Health of the Russian Federation.

From 1976 to 2003 she was a Professor of Biology of Moscow State University and gave a series of lectures on comparative immunology.

Artsimovich died on 2 May 2023. She was buried next to her husband at the Novodevichy Cemetery in Moscow.

== Selected works ==
- Арцимович Н. Г. (1971). Иммунобиологические свойства свежих и консервированных тканей при ауто- и гомопластике (Эксперим. исследование) : Автореф. дис. … д-ра мед. наук. М.
- Арцимович Н. Г. (1987). Иммунология эмбриогенеза : Курс лекций для студентов биол. фак. гос. ун-тов (1500 экз ed.). М.: Изд-во МГУ.
- Арцимович Н. Г. (1991). Программа дисциплины "Основы иммунологии" для государственных Университетов. Изд-во Моск. ун-та.
- Арцимович Н. Г., Белокрылов Г. А., Василенко А. М. и др. (1993). Иммунофизиология. Основы современной физиологии (800 экз ed.). СПб.: Наука. Санкт-Петербург. изд. фирма. ISBN 5-02-025815-6 – via Под ред. Е. А. Корневой.
- Арцимович Н. Г., Галушкина Т. С. (2002). Синдром хронической усталости (500 экз ed.). М.: Науч. мир. ISBN 5-89176-119-X.
