= Caroline Herschel =

German-British astronomer (1750–1848)

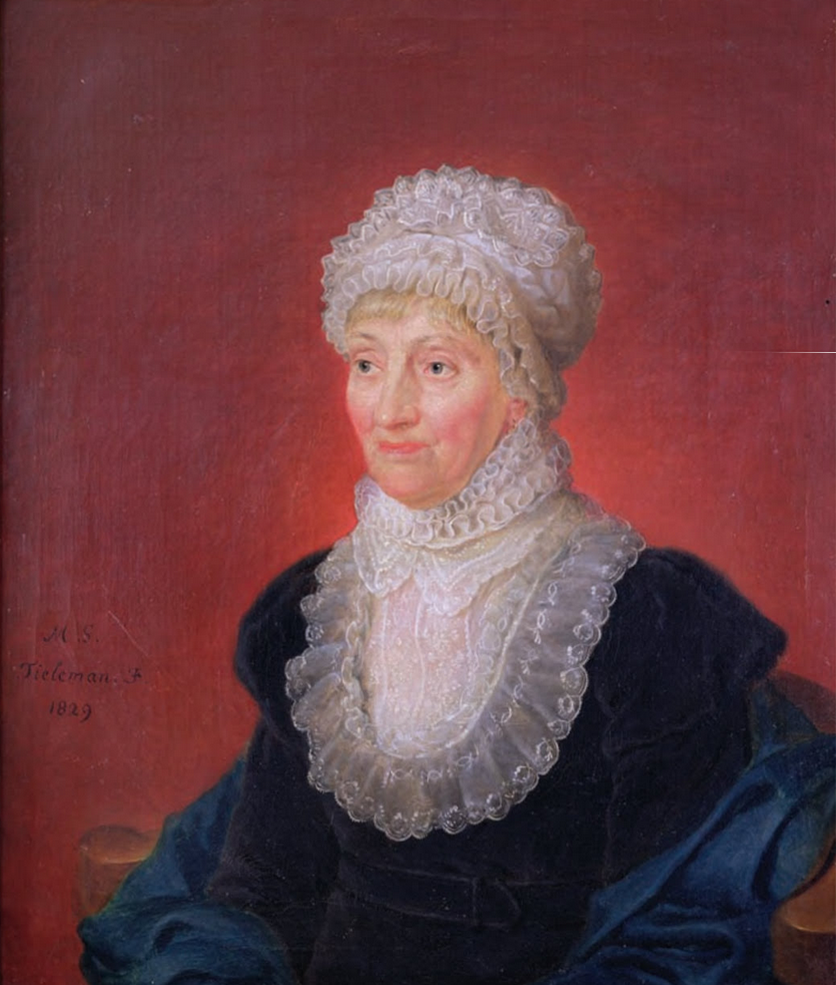
- Portrait c. 1829
- Born: Caroline Lucretia Herschel; 16 March 1750; Hanover, Electorate of Hanover, Holy Roman Empire
- Died: 9 January 1848 (aged 97); Hanover, Kingdom of Hanover, German Confederation
- Known for: Discovery of many celestial objects
- Relatives: William Herschel (brother), John Herschel (nephew)
- Awards: Gold Medal of the Royal Astronomical Society (1828); Gold Medal for Science (Prussia) (1846)
- Scientific career
- Fields: Astronomy

Caroline Lucretia Herschel (/ˈhɜːrʃəl, ˈhɛərʃəl/ HUR-shəl, HAIR-shəl, German: [kaʁoˈliːnə ˈhɛʁʃl̩]; 16 March 1750 – 9 January 1848) was a German-British astronomer, (Note: Born in Germany with German ancestry, she spent most of her life and career in England.) whose most significant contributions to astronomy were the discoveries of several comets, including the periodic comet 35P/Herschel–Rigollet, which bears her name. She was the younger sister of astronomer William Herschel, with whom she worked for most of her career. She was born in Germany, and spent 50 years in England, before returning to Germany in 1822.

She was the first professional female astronomer, and the first woman to receive a salary as a scientist, and the first woman in England to hold a government position. She was also the first woman to publish scientific findings in the Philosophical Transactions of the Royal Society, to be awarded a Gold Medal of the Royal Astronomical Society (1828), and to be named an honorary Member of the Royal Astronomical Society (1835, with Mary Somerville). She was named an honorary member of the Royal Irish Academy (1838). The King of Prussia presented her with a gold medal for Science on the occasion of her 96th birthday (1846).

== Early life ==
Caroline Lucretia Herschel was born in the town of Hanover, Germany on 16 March 1750. She was the eighth child and fourth daughter of Isaac Herschel (1707–1767), a self-taught oboist, and his wife, Anna Ilse Moritzen (1710–1789). The Herschel family originated from Pirna in Saxony, near Dresden. Isaak became a bandmaster in the Hanoverian Foot Guards, whom he first joined in 1731, and was away with his regiment for substantial periods. He became ill after the Battle of Dettingen (in the War of the Austrian Succession) in 1743 and never recovered fully; he suffered a weak constitution, chronic pain, and asthma for the remainder of his life. The oldest of their daughters, Sophia Elizabeth Herschel (1733–1803), was sixteen years older, and the only surviving girl besides Caroline. She married violinist Joachim Heinrich Griesbach (1730–1773) when Caroline was five, which resulted in the younger girl being tasked with much of the household drudgery. Caroline and the other children received a cursory education, learning to read and write and little more. Her father attempted to educate her at home but his efforts were more successful with the boys.

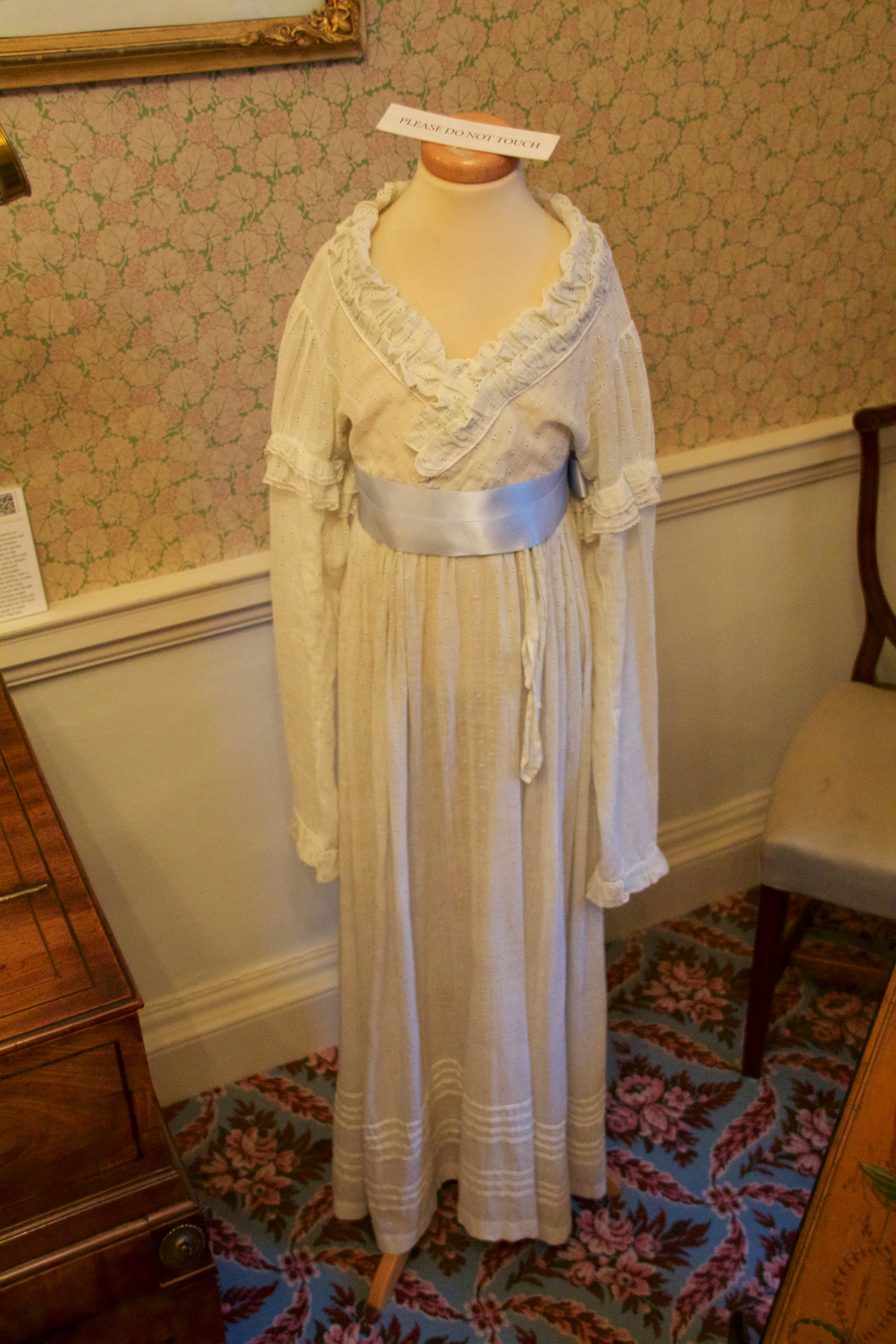
A dress of Caroline's preserved at the Herschel Museum of Astronomy, evidencing her small frame and stature into adulthood due to her stunted growth as a result of severe Typhus during childhood

At the age of ten Caroline was struck with a severe case of typhus, which so stunted her growth that she never grew more than 4 feet 3 inches (1.30 m) tall; she also lost vision in her right eye as a result of the illness. Her family assumed that she would never marry and her mother thought it better that she train to be a house servant than be educated in accordance with her father's wishes. However, her father sometimes took advantage of her mother's absence by tutoring her individually, or including her in her brother's lessons, such as violin. Caroline had difficulty blending into the local society and made few friends.

Following her father's death, her brothers William and Alexander proposed that she join them in Bath, England, to have a trial period as a singer for musician brother William's church performances. Caroline eventually left Hanover on 15 August 1772 after her brothers intervened with their recalcitrant mother. On the journey to England, she was first introduced to astronomy by way of the constellations and opticians' shops.

In Bath, she took on the responsibilities of running William's household, and William repaid this by offering her tutoring which included lessons in English, music, math, astronomy, and singing. She learned to play the harpsichord, and eventually became an integral part in William's musical performances at small gatherings. William had established himself as an organist and music teacher at 19 New King Street, Bath (now the Herschel Museum of Astronomy). He was also the choirmaster of the Octagon Chapel. William was busy with his musical career and became fairly busy organising public concerts.

She became the principal singer at his oratorio concerts, and acquired such a reputation as a vocalist that she was offered an engagement for the Birmingham festival after a performance of Handel's Messiah in April 1778, where she was the first soloist. She declined to sing for any conductor but William, and after that performance, her career as a singer began to decline. Caroline was subsequently replaced as a performer by distinguished soloists from outside the area because William wished to spend less time in rehearsals to focus on astronomy.

== Transition to astronomy ==
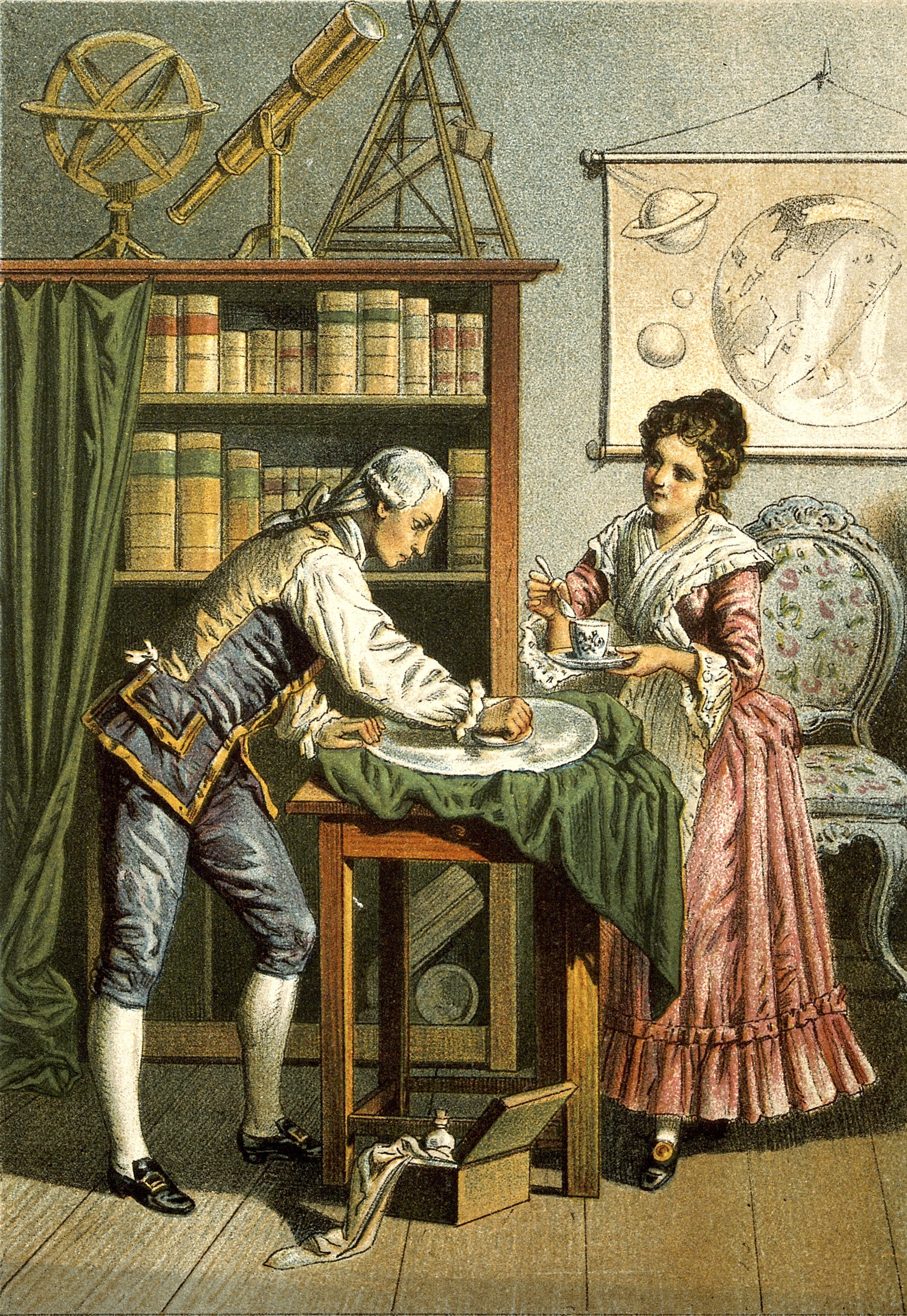
Caroline Herschel giving tea to her brother William polishing a telescope mirror, 1896 Lithograph

When William became increasingly interested in astronomy, transforming himself from a musician to an astronomer, Caroline supported his efforts. She is later quoted as saying "I did nothing for my brother, but what a well-trained puppy-dog would have done: that is to say, I did what he commanded me. I was a mere tool which he had the trouble of sharpening.". Ultimately, though, she had become interested in astronomy and was progressively taking initiative as she learned from her brother.

In the 1770s, as William became more interested in astronomy, he started to build his own telescopes from lenses he had ground, unhappy with the quality of lenses he was able to purchase. Caroline would feed him and read to him as he worked, despite her desire to burnish her career as a professional singer.

She became a significant astronomer in her own right as a result of her collaboration with him. The Herschels moved to a new house in March 1781 after their millinery business failed, and Caroline was guarding the leftover stock on 13 March, the night that William discovered the planet Uranus. Though he mistook it for a comet, his discovery proved the superiority of his new telescope. Caroline and William gave their last musical performance in 1782, when her brother accepted the private office of court astronomer to King George III; the last few months of their musical career had been in shambles and were critically panned.

== Astronomical career ==
=== First discoveries and catalogue ===
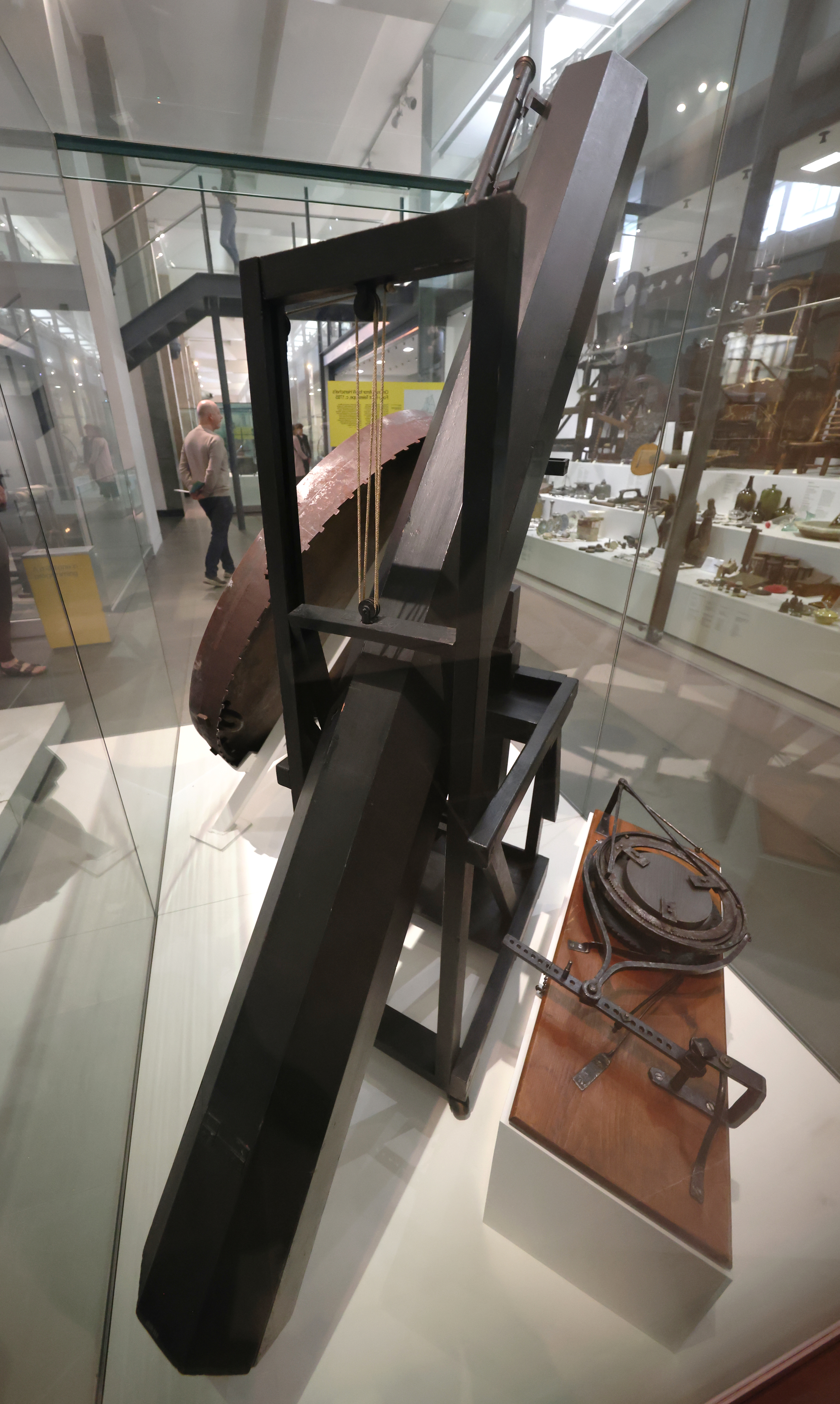
A telescope that William Herschel made for Caroline 1795

William's interest in astronomy started as a hobby to pass time at night. At breakfast the next day he would give an impromptu lecture on what he had learned the night before. Caroline became as interested as William, stating that she was "much hindered in my practice by my help being continually wanted in the execution of the various astronomical contrivances." William became known for his work on high performance telescopes, and Caroline found herself supporting his efforts. Caroline spent many hours polishing mirrors and mounting telescopes in order to maximize the amount of light captured. She learned to copy astronomical catalogues and other publications that William had borrowed. She also learned to record, reduce, and organize her brother's astronomical observations. She recognized that this work demanded speed, precision and accuracy.

Caroline was asked to move from the high culture of Bath to the relative backwater of Datchet in 1782, a small town near Windsor Castle where William would be on hand to entertain royal guests. He presumed that Caroline would become his assistant, a role she did not initially accept. She was unhappy with the accommodations they had taken; the house they rented for three years had a leaky ceiling and Caroline described it as "the ruins of a place". She was also aghast at the prices in the city and the fact that their domestic servant was imprisoned for theft at the time of her arrival. While William worked on a catalogue of 3,000 stars, studied double stars, and attempted to discover the cause of Mira's and Algol's variability, Caroline was asked to "sweep" the sky, meticulously moving through the sky in strips to search for interesting objects. She was unhappy with this task at the beginning of her work, longing for the culture of Bath and feeling isolated and lonely, but gradually developed a love for the work. When she discovered her first comet, she wrote of the important role played by amateurs.

On 28 August 1782, Caroline initiated her first record book. She inscribed the first three opening pages: "This is what I call the Bills & Rec.ds of my Comets", (Note: According to astronomer John Louis Emil Dreyer, "Rec.ds" probably means Records.) "Comets and Letters", and "Books of Observations". This, along with two subsequent books, currently belong to the Herschel trove at the Royal Astronomical Society in London.

On 26 February 1783, Caroline discovered a nebula that was not included in the Messier catalogue for the first time. That same night, she independently discovered Messier 110 (NGC 205), the second companion of the Andromeda Galaxy. William himself then began to search for nebulae, sensing that there were many discoveries to be made. Caroline was relegated to a ladder on William's 20-foot reflector, attempting impossible measurements of double stars. William quickly realized his method of searching for nebulae was inefficient and he required an assistant to keep records. Naturally, he turned to Caroline.

But it was not til the last two months of the same year before I felt the least encouragement for spending the starlight nights on a grass-plot covered with dew or hoar frost without a human being near enough to be within call.

In the summer of 1783, William finished building a comet-searching telescope for Caroline, which she began to use immediately. Beginning in October 1783, the Herschels used a 20-foot reflecting telescope to search for nebulae. Initially, William attempted to both observe and record objects, but this too was inefficient and he again turned to Caroline. She sat by a window inside, William shouted his observations, and Caroline recorded. This was not a simple clerical task, however, because she would have to use John Flamsteed's catalogue, Historia Coelestis Britannica, to identify the star William used as a reference point for the nebulae. In 1798 Caroline presented to the Royal Society an index to John Flamsteed's observations, together with a catalogue of 560 stars omitted from the British Catalogue and a list of the errata in that publication. Because Flamsteed's catalogue was organized by constellation, it was less useful to the Herschels, so Caroline created her own catalogue organized by north polar distance. The following morning, Caroline would go over her notes and write up formal observations, which she called "minding the heavens."

=== Comets ===
"An Account of a New Comet"
by Caroline Herschel 1787
Read by Availle for LibriVox
Audio 00:05:00 (full text)

During 1786–1797 she discovered eight comets, the first on 1 August 1786 while her brother was away and she was using his telescope. She had unquestioned priority as discoverer of five of the comets and rediscovered Comet Encke in 1795. Five of her comets were published in Philosophical Transactions. A packet of paper bearing the superscription, "This is what I call the Bills and Receipts of my Comets" contains some data connected with the discovery of each of these objects. William was summoned to Windsor Castle to demonstrate Caroline's comet to the royal family. William recorded this phenomenon, himself, terming it "My Sister's Comet." Caroline Herschel is often credited as the first woman to discover a comet; however, Maria Kirch discovered a comet in the early 1700s, but is often overlooked because at the time, the discovery was attributed to her husband, Gottfried Kirch.

Caroline Herschel wrote a letter to the Astronomer Royal Nevil Maskelyne to announce the discovery of her second comet. In December 1788, Maskelyne wrote back congratulating her. The third comet was discovered on 7 January 1790, and the fourth one on 17 April 1790. She announced both of these to Sir Joseph Banks, and all were discovered with her 1783 telescope. In 1791, Caroline began to use a 9-inch telescope for her comet-searching, and discovered three more comets with this instrument. Her fifth comet was discovered on 15 December 1791 and the sixth on 7 October 1795. Caroline wrote in her journal during this time "My brother wrote an account of it to Sir J. Banks, Dr. Maskelyne, and to several astronomical correspondents" for the discovery of her fifth comet. Two years later, her eighth and last comet was discovered on 6 August 1797, the only comet she discovered without optical aid. She announced this discovery by sending a letter to Banks. In 1787, she was granted an annual salary of £50 (equivalent to £6,800 in 2025) by George III for her work as William's assistant. Caroline's appointment made her the first woman in England honoured with an official government position, and the first woman to be paid for her work in astronomy.

In 1797 William's observations had shown that there were a great many discrepancies in the star catalogue published by John Flamsteed, which was difficult to use because it had been published as two volumes, the catalogue proper and a volume of original observations, and contained many errors. William realised that he needed a proper cross-index to properly explore these differences but was reluctant to devote time to it at the expense of his more interesting astronomical activities. He therefore recommended to Caroline that she undertake the task, which ultimately took 20 months. The resulting Catalogue of Stars, Taken from Mr. Flamsteed's Observations Contained in the Second Volume of the Historia Coelestis, and Not Inserted in the British Catalogue was published by the Royal Society in 1798 and contained an index of every observation of every star made by Flamsteed, a list of errata, and a list of more than 560 stars that had not been included. In 1825, Caroline donated the works of Flamsteed to the Royal Academy of Göttingen.

=== Relationship with William ===
Throughout her writings, she repeatedly made it clear that she desired to earn an independent wage and be able to support herself. When the crown began paying her for her assistance to her brother in 1787, she became the first woman—at a time when even men rarely received wages for scientific enterprises—to receive a salary for services to science. Her pension was £50 a year, and it was the first money that Caroline had ever earned in her own right.

When William married a rich widow, Mary Pitt (née Baldwin) in 1788, the union caused tension in the brother-sister relationship. Caroline has been referred to as a bitter, jealous woman who worshipped her brother and resented those who invaded their domestic lives.

In his book The Age of Wonder, Richard Holmes is more sympathetic to Caroline's position, noting that the change was in many respects negative for Caroline. With the arrival of William's wife, Caroline lost her managerial and social responsibilities in the household and accompanying status. She also moved from the house to external lodgings, returning daily to work with her brother. She no longer held the keys to the observatory and workroom, where she had done much of her own work. As she destroyed her journals from 1788 to 1798, her feelings about the period are not entirely known. In August 1799, Caroline was independently recognized for her work, when she spent a week in Greenwich as a guest of the royal family.

Barthélemy Faujas de Saint-Fond, writing in 1797 of recent travels when he had encountered the Herschels, indicated she and her brother continued working well during this period. When her brother and his family were away from home, she often returned there to take care of it for them. In later life, she and Lady Herschel exchanged letters, and with her nephew, astronomer John Herschel. Thousands of these letters were preserved and have been made digitally available.

William's marriage likely led to Caroline becoming more independent of her brother and more a figure in her own right. Caroline made many discoveries independently of William and continued to work solo on many of the astronomical projects which contributed to her rise to fame.

=== New General Catalogue ===
In 1802, the Royal Society published Caroline's catalogue in its Philosophical Transactions of the Royal Society A under William's name. This listed around 500 new nebulae and clusters in addition to the already known 2,000.

Toward the end of Caroline's life, she arranged 2,500 nebulae and star clusters into zones of similar polar distances so that her nephew, John Herschel, could re-examine them systematically. The list was eventually enlarged and renamed the New General Catalogue. Many non-stellar objects are still identified by their NGC number.

== Later life and legacy ==
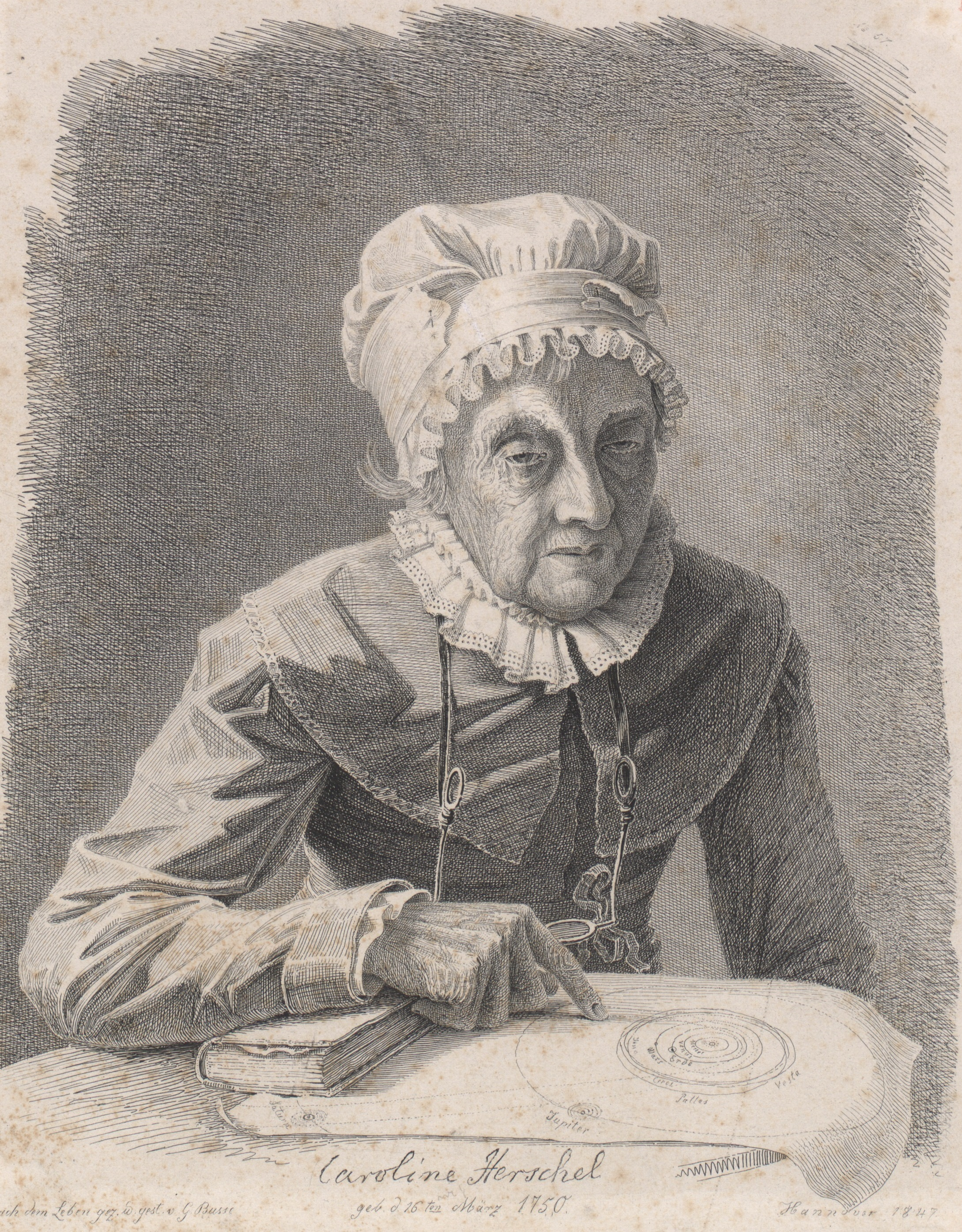
1847 lithograph of Caroline Herschel around 97 years of age

Caroline continued to assist William with his observations but her status had greatly advanced from the housekeeper role she had served in her young days. She was the guest of Maskelyne at the Royal Observatory in 1799 and a guest of members of the Royal Family at various times in 1816, 1817 and 1818.

After her brother died in 1822, Caroline was grief-stricken and moved back to Hanover, Germany, continuing her astronomical studies to verify and confirm William's findings and producing a catalogue of nebulae to assist her nephew John Herschel in his work. However, her observations were hampered by the architecture in Hanover, and she spent most of her time working on the catalogue. Her nephew thought highly of her, in fact he was quoted in 1832 as saying “She runs about the town with me and skips up her two flights of stairs as wonderfully fresh at least as some folks I could name who are not a fourth of her age… In the morning till eleven or twelve she is dull and weary, but as the day advances she gains life, and is quite ‘fresh and funny’ at ten or eleven p.m. and sings old rhymes, nay, even dances to the great delight of all who see her." John Herschel spent long periods with his aunt during the vacations and was greatly influenced by Caroline. She saw him educated at Cambridge, make a name for himself as a mathematician, become elected to the Royal Society, join his father in research in astronomy and be awarded the Copley Medal of the Royal Society for his achievements. Upon William's death, her nephew John took over observing at Slough. Caroline had given him his first introduction into astronomy, when she showed him the constellations in Flamsteed's Atlas. Caroline added her final entry to her observing book on 31 January 1824 about the Great Comet of 1823, which had already been discovered on 29 December 1823.

In 1828 the Royal Astronomical Society presented her with their Gold Medal for this work—no woman would be awarded it again until Vera Rubin in 1996. Throughout the twilight of her life, Caroline remained physically active and healthy, and regularly socialized with other scientific luminaries. She spent her last years writing her memoirs and lamenting her body's limitations, which kept her from making any more original discoveries.

Caroline Herschel died peacefully in Hanover on 9 January 1848. She is buried at 35 Marienstrasse in Hanover at the cemetery of the Gartengemeinde, next to her parents and with a lock of William's hair. Her tombstone inscription reads, "The eyes of her who is glorified here below turned to the starry heavens." With her brother, she discovered over 2,400 astronomical objects over twenty years.

== Honours ==
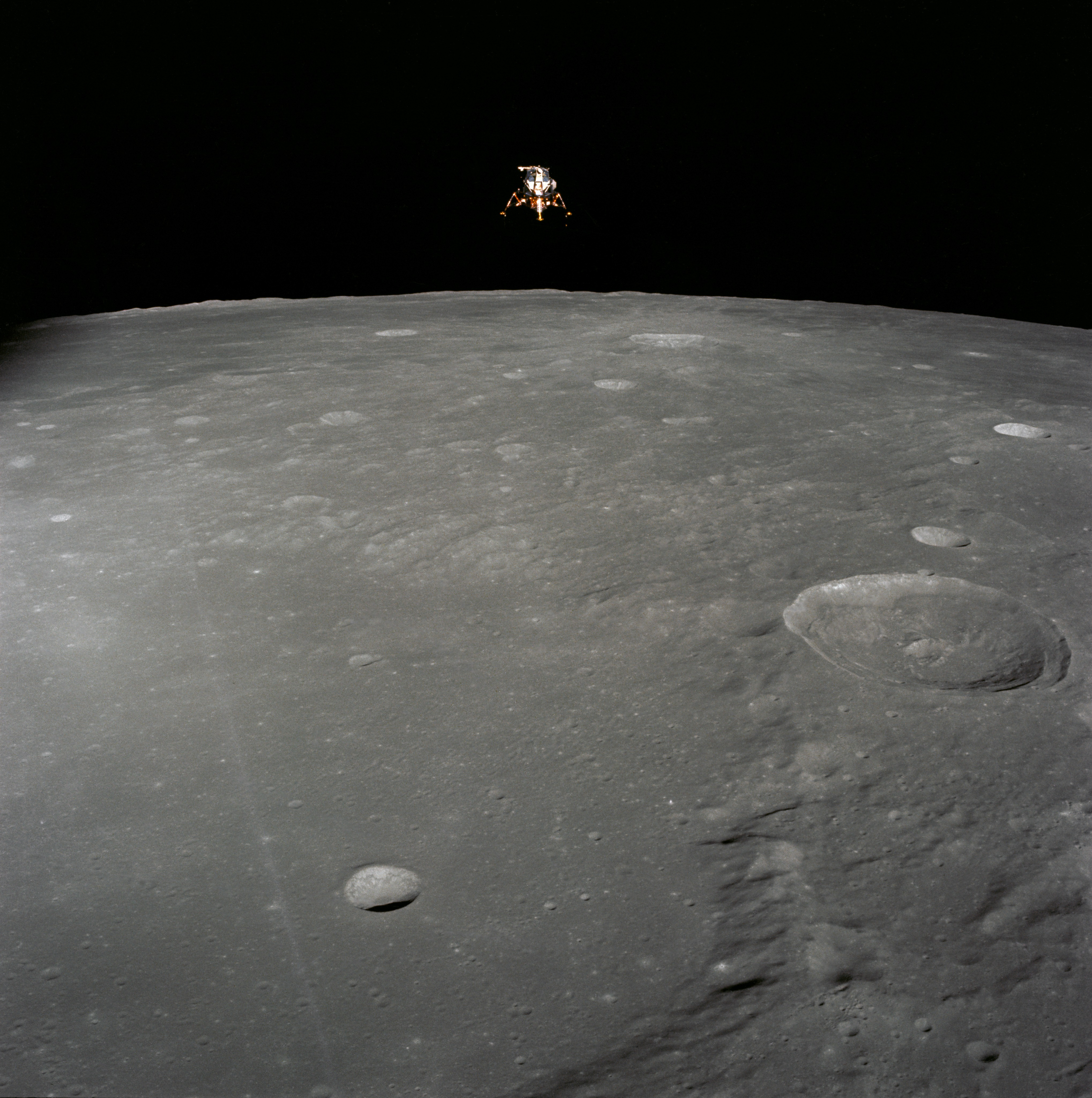
View from the Apollo 12 orbiter, Herschel named after William is the large crater seen centre right, C. Herschel named after Caroline is the small one directly above it

Herschel was honoured by the King of Prussia and the Royal Astronomical Society. The gold medal from the Astronomical Society was awarded to her in 1828 "for her recent reduction, to January, 1800, of the [2,500] Nebulæ discovered by her illustrious brother, which may be considered as the completion of a series of exertions probably unparalleled either in magnitude or importance in the annals of astronomical labour." She completed this work after her brother's death and her move to Hanover.

The Royal Astronomical Society elected her an honorary member in 1835, along with Mary Somerville; they were the first female members. She was also elected as an honorary member of the Royal Irish Academy in Dublin in 1838.

In 1846, at the age of 96, she was awarded a gold medal for Science by the King of Prussia, conveyed to her by Alexander von Humboldt, "in recognition of the valuable services rendered to Astronomy by you, as the fellow-worker of your immortal brother, Sir William Herschel, by discoveries, observations, and laborious calculations".

The asteroid 281 Lucretia (discovered 1888) was named after Caroline's second given name, and the crater C. Herschel on the Moon is named after her. The open clusters NGC 2360 (Caroline's Cluster) and NGC 7789 (Caroline's Rose) are unofficially nicknamed in her honour. On 6 November 2020, a satellite named after her (ÑuSat 10 or "Caroline", COSPAR 2020-079B) was launched into space.

Adrienne Rich's 1968 poem "Planetarium" celebrates Caroline Herschel's life and scientific achievements. Judy Chicago's 1969 artwork The Dinner Party, which celebrates historical women who have made extraordinary contributions, features a place setting for Caroline Herschel. Google honoured her with a Google Doodle on her 266th birthday (16 March 2016).

Poet Jessy Randall's 2022 collection Mathematics for Ladies includes a poem honouring Herschel.

In 2023, the 57 densely handwritten pages of her diary were put on display in the music room of the Herschel Museum of Astronomy in Bath, the same place that Herschel resided. The documents cost the museum £108,000, making it by far the institution's most expensive acquisition. Her earned salary from King George III made her the first known professional female astronomer. The diary documents her life in the years 1755 to 1775, the years of Herschel's childhood in Hanover in a large family which produced an ample number of musicians, and leading up to her first years living in Bath.

In 2024, UK musician and singer-songwriter Jay Anderson released the single 'Moving' on Real Kind Records, a song dedicated to the life and times of Caroline Herschel. He filmed a live acoustic version of the song at The Herschel Museum in Bath, sat in the old music room where Caroline and her brother used to rehearse for local concerts.

== See also ==
- Timeline of women in science
