= 281 Lucretia =

Main-belt asteroid

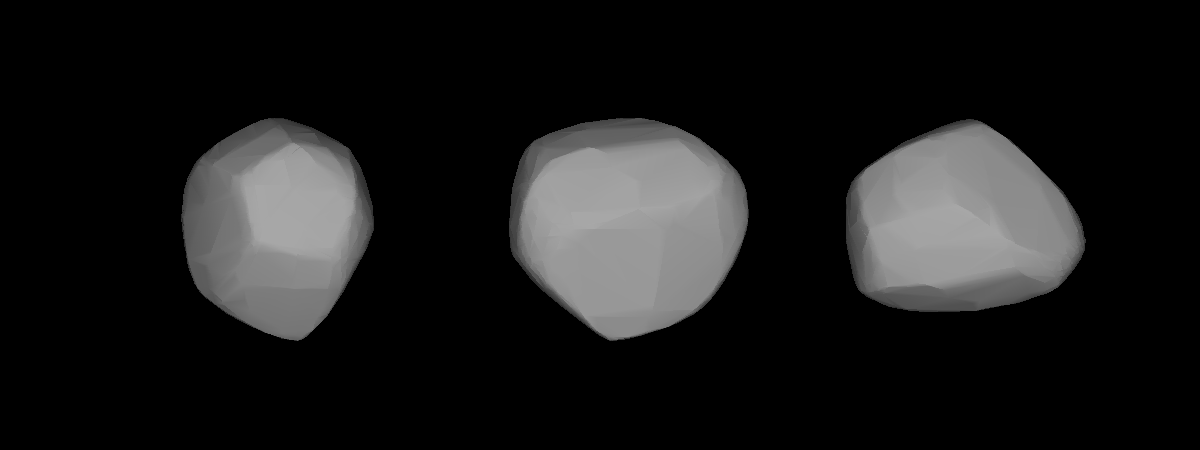
- A three-dimensional model of 281 Lucretia based on its lightcurve

Discovery
- Discovered by: Johann Palisa
- Discovery date: 31 October 1888

Designations
- Pronunciation: /luːˈkriːʃə/
- Named after: Caroline Lucretia Herschel
- Alternative designations: A888 UC, 1906 FD; 1948 EK, 1984 JX
- Minor planet category: Main belt (Flora family)

Orbital characteristics
- Epoch 31 July 2016 (JD 2457600.5)
- Uncertainty parameter 0
- Observation arc: 126.00 yr (46020 d)
- Aphelion: 2.47750 AU (370.629 Gm)
- Perihelion: 1.89821 AU (283.968 Gm)
- Semi-major axis: 2.18786 AU (327.299 Gm)
- Eccentricity: 0.13239
- Orbital period (sidereal): 3.24 yr (1182.0 d)
- Mean anomaly: 161.880°
- Mean motion: 0° 18^{m} 16.423^{s} / day
- Inclination: 5.30407°
- Longitude of ascending node: 31.4134°
- Argument of perihelion: 16.7540°

Physical characteristics
- Dimensions: 11.76±0.9 km 12 km
- Mean density: ~2.7 g/cm^{3}
- Synodic rotation period: 0.181 d (4.348 h)
- Geometric albedo: 0.1987±0.035; 0.199
- Spectral type: S
- Absolute magnitude (H): 12.02

281 Lucretia is an asteroid belonging to the Flora family in the Main Belt. It was discovered by Austrian astronomer Johann Palisa on 31 October 1888 in Vienna, and is named after the middle name of Caroline Herschel, one of the first female astronomers. Light curves of this asteroid show a synodic rotation period of 4.349±0.001 h with an amplitude of 0.3–0.4 magnitude. The spin axis appears nearly perpendicular to the ecliptic.
