= Heis (crater) =

Crater on the Moon

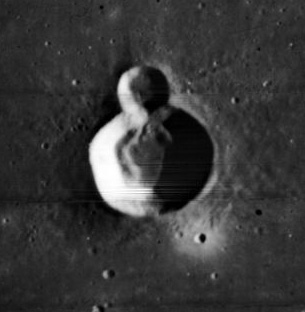
- Lunar Orbiter 4 image
- Coordinates: 32.4°N 31.9°W
- Diameter: 14 km
- Depth: 0.7 km
- Colongitude: 32° at sunrise
- Formation: Eratosthenian
- Eponym: Eduard Heis

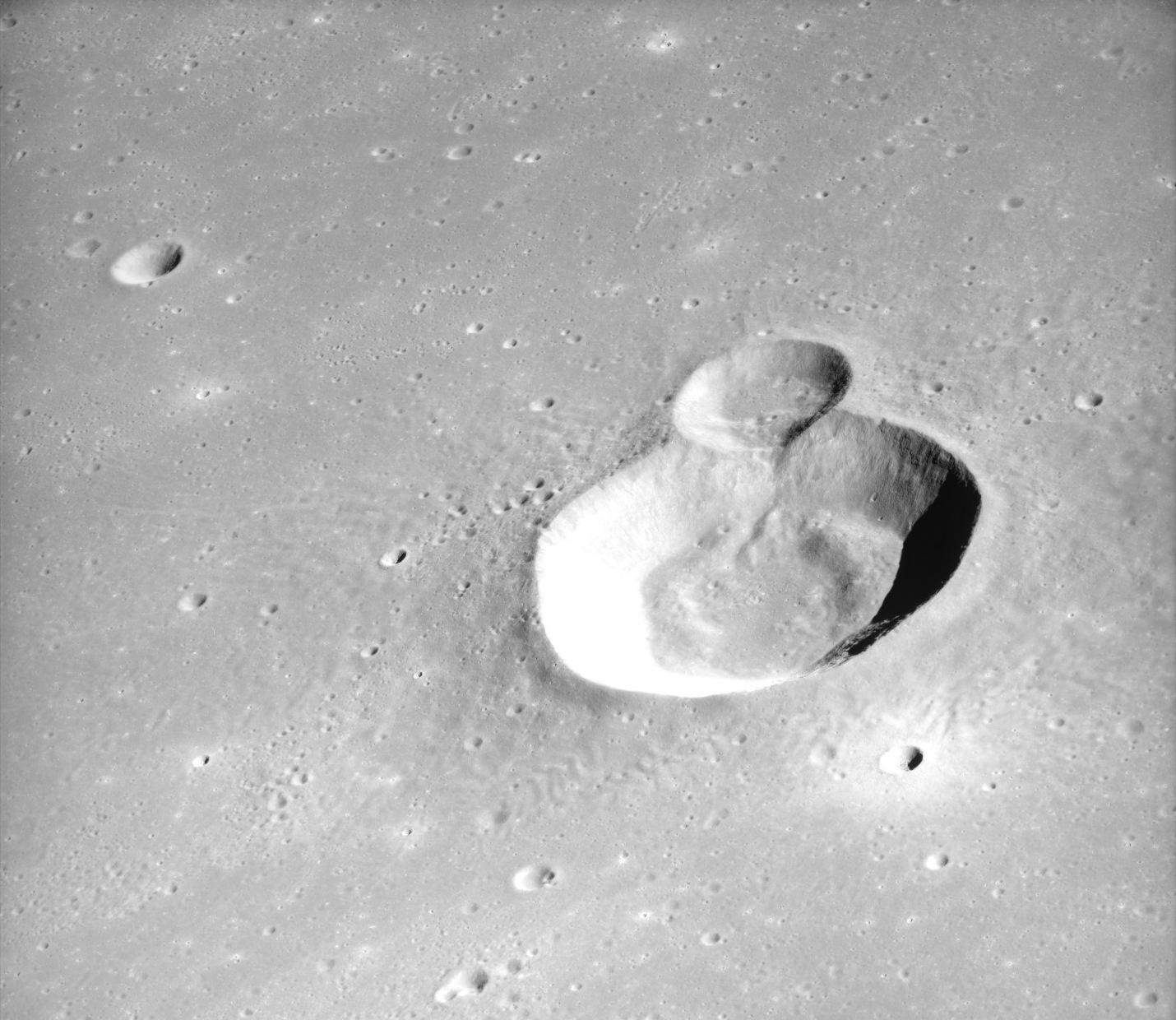
Obilique Apollo 15 panoramic camera image

Heis is a small lunar impact crater that is located in the western part of the Mare Imbrium. It was named after German astronomer Eduard Heis. It is located to the northeast of the crater Delisle, and south of C. Herschel. Due east is the wrinkle ridge Dorsum Heim. Heis is a circular, symmetrical formation with an interior floor that is about half the diameter of the outer rim. The tiny satellite crater Heis A intrudes slightly into the northern rim.

== Satellite craters ==
By convention these features are identified on lunar maps by placing the letter on the side of the crater midpoint that is closest to Heis.

Heis	Latitude	Longitude	Diameter
A	32.7° N	31.9° W	6 km
D	31.7° N	31.1° W	8 km
