= Lev Artsimovich =

Soviet physicist (1909–1973)

- Лев Арцимович
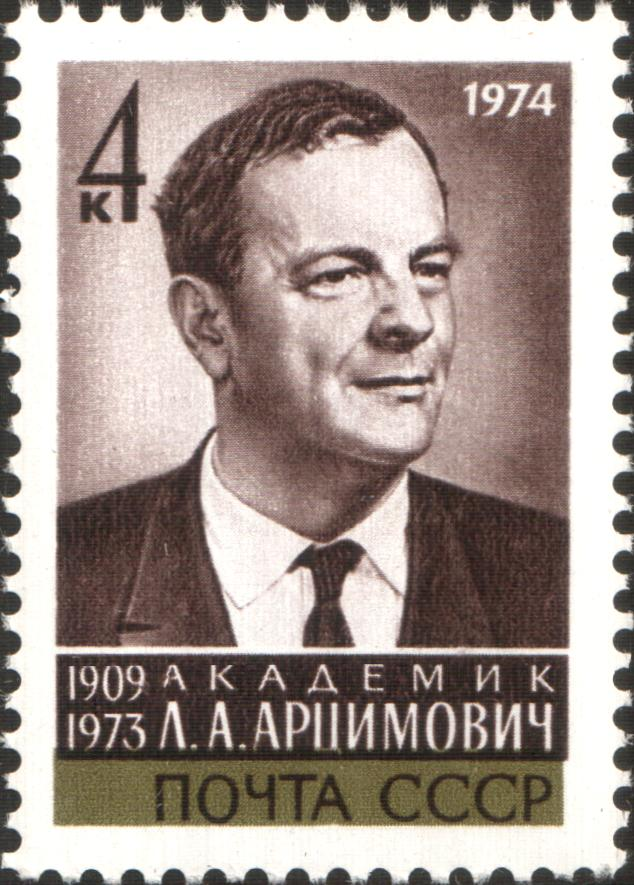
- Artsimovich on a 1974 Soviet commemorative stamp
- Born: Lev Andreyevich Artsimovich; 25 February 1909; Moscow, Russian Empire
- Died: March 1, 1973 (aged 64); Moscow, Soviet Union (Present-day Moscow, Russia)
- Resting place: Novodevichy Cemetery
- Citizenship: Soviet Union
- Education: Belarusian State University
- Known for: Soviet atomic bomb project Inventor of Tokamak; Uranium enrichment
- Spouse: Ninel Artsimovich
- Awards: Lenin Prize (1966); Hero of Socialist Labor (1969); USSR State Prize (1971)
- Scientific career
- Fields: Physics
- Workplaces: LFTI; Laboratory No. 2 Soviet Academy of Sciences

Lev Andreyevich Artsimovich (Russian: Лев Андреевич Арцимович, February 25, 1909 – March 1, 1973), also transliterated Arzimowitsch, was a Soviet physicist known for his contributions to the Tokamak— a device that produces controlled thermonuclear fusion power.

Prior to conceiving the idea on nuclear fusion, Artsimovich participated in the former Soviet program of nuclear weapons, and was a recipient of many former Soviet honors and awards.

== Biography ==
Artsimovich was born on 25 February 1909 in Moscow in the Russian Empire. His family had Polish nobility roots; nonetheless, he was described as Russian by his biographer in 1985. His grandfather, a professor, was exiled to Siberia after the Polish uprising against Tsarist Russia in 1863 and married a Russian woman, later settling in Smolensk. His father was educated at Lviv University; his mother was a pianist trained in Switzerland. During the civil war, the family was very poor. The parents were forced to send their son to an orphanage, from where he ran away and was homeless for a while. After the end of the civil war, the family's situation gradually improved. In 1923, Soviet authorities moved the Artsimovich family (due to suspicion of Anti-bolshevist activity) to Minsk, where he found employment in the railroad industry and started training towards becoming a railroad engineer. After his father found employment at Belarus State University, Artsimovich was able to attend the physics program at Belarus State University, and graduated with a specialist degree in physics in 1928–29. After moving to Moscow, he found employment in Artem Alikhanian's laboratory, and joined the staff at the Ioffe Institute in 1930.

Initially, he worked on problems relating to nuclear physics and unsuccessfully defended his thesis for a Candidate of Sciences degree in 1937 and in 1939 at the Leningrad Polytechnical Institute, receiving only a written endorsement from the Ioffe Institute. During his lifetime, Artsimovich was recommended by many leading Soviet physicists to be conferred a Doktor Nauk (a Russian PhD), but the recommendations were later dismissed.

In 1945, Artsimovich joined the Soviet program of nuclear weapons, working on an electromagnetic method of isotope separation of uranium at Laboratory No. 2 along with Isaak Pomeranchuk. He was given Russian espionage files from Soviet agencies on the Manhattan Project's electromagnetic method. But the uranium enrichment under Artsimovich failed when it proved too costly since the electricity required for this work could not be produced by the Soviet power grid at that time. Despite being removed by Beria, Artsimovich continued work on gas discharges with support from Kurchatov at his Laboratory No. 2. After 1949, his work focused on the field of nuclear fusion by producing lithium-6 for the RDS-6s device.

From 1951 to his death in 1973, Artsimovich was the head of the fusion power program in the former Soviet Union and became known as "the father of the Tokamak", a special concept for a fusion reactor. He presented record-breaking results from the T-3 tokamak at the 3rd international fusion energy conference of the IAEA in 1968, setting off the worldwide "tokamak stampede". Once Artsimovich was asked when the first thermonuclear reactor would start its work. He replied: "When mankind needs it, maybe a short time before that."

In 1953, he became an academician of the Soviet Academy of Sciences and then a member of its Presidium in 1957. From 1963 to 1973, he was vice-chairman of the Russian chapter of the Pugwash Committee and chairman of the National Committee of Soviet Physicists. In 1966, he visited the United States to deliver a lecture on fusion and Tokamak technology at MIT, and was elected a Foreign Honorary Member of the American Academy of Arts and Sciences. He has been a foreign member of German Academy of Sciences at Berlin since 1969, and a member of the Czechoslovak, Yugoslav and Swedish Academies of Sciences. On 1 March 1973, Artsimovich died due to cardiac arrest in Moscow. The crater Artsimovich on the Moon is named after him.

== Honours and awards ==
- 1946 – Member of the Academy of Sciences of the Soviet Union
- 1953 – Academician of the USSR
- 1953 – Stalin Prize, first class
- 1957 – Academician-secretary of the Department of General Physics and Astronomy, USSR Academy of Sciences, member of the Presidium of the USSR
- 1958 – Lenin Prize
- 1965 – Honorary Member of the Czechoslovak Academy of Sciences
- 1966 – Foreign Honorary Member of the American Academy of Arts and Sciences
- 1968 – Foreign Member of the Swedish Academy of Sciences
- 1969 – Honorary Member of the Yugoslav Academy of Sciences
- 1969 – Hero of Socialist Labour
- 1970 – Honorary Citizen of Texas (USA)
- 1971 – USSR State Prize
- 1972 – Honorary Doctor of the University of Warsaw
- Four Orders of Lenin
- Two Orders of the Red Banner of Labour

== See also ==
- Russian Alsos
