= Diophantus (crater) =

Crater on the Moon

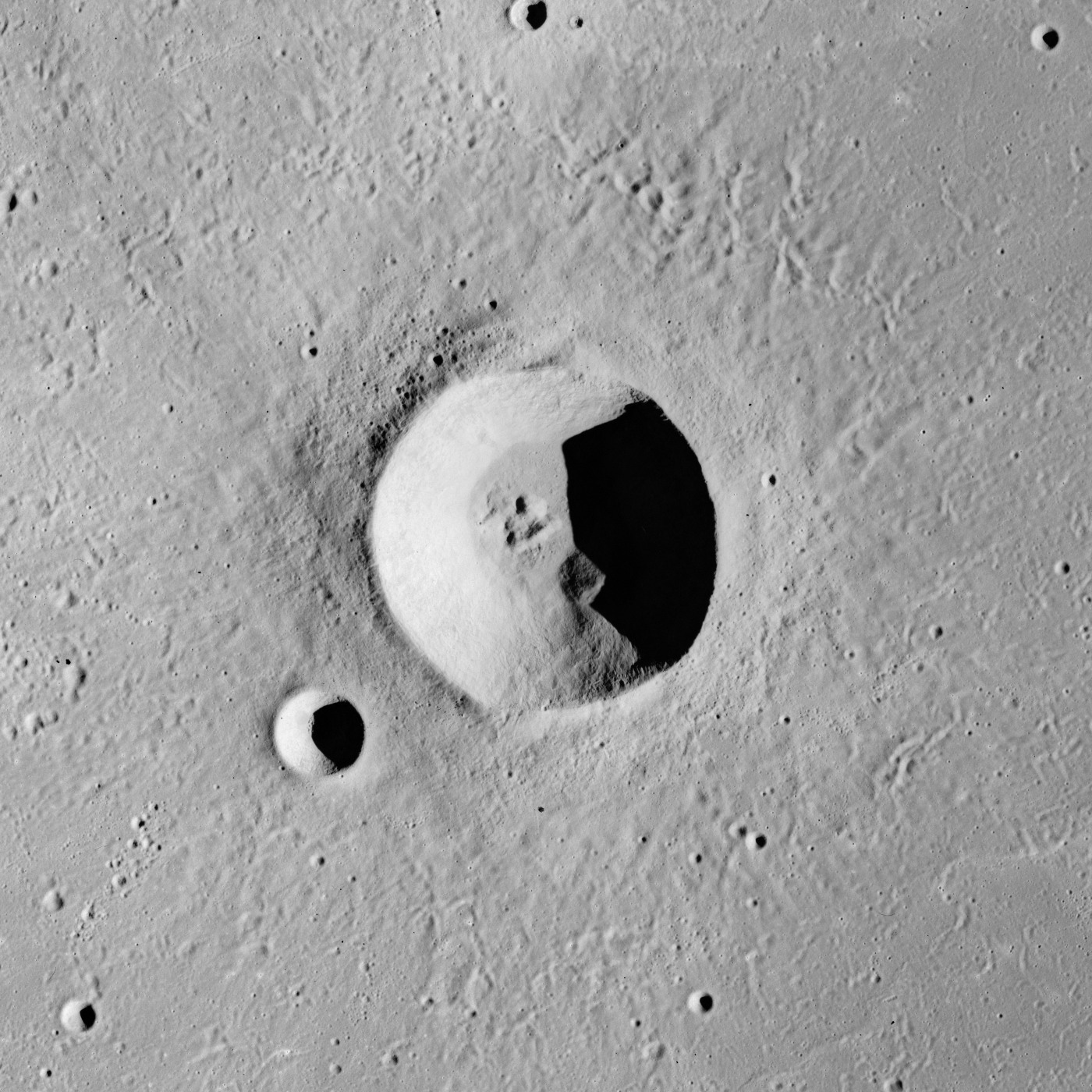
- Apollo 15 image
- Coordinates: 27.6°N 34.3°W
- Diameter: 17.57 km (10.92 mi)
- Depth: 3.02 km (1.88 mi)
- Colongitude: 34° at sunrise
- Formation: Eratosthenian
- Eponym: Diophantus

Diophantus is a small lunar impact crater that lies in the southwestern part of the Mare Imbrium. It forms a pair with the larger crater Delisle to the north. At a similar distance to the west is the smaller Artsimovich crater and the Fedorov feature.

On the lunar geologic timescale, Diophantus is a crater of Eratosthenian age. It is a sharp-edged crater with a wide inner wall and a low central rise. It shows no degradation from subsequent impacts. High resolution imagery of the inner wall show dark streaks, which originate from material exposed by the impact. A skirt of ejecta spreads across the surrounding mare surface. The cup-shaped impact crater Diophantus C lies prominently near the exterior of the southwest wall.

To the north of Diophantus is the sinuous rille designated Rima Diophantus, named after the crater. It is centered at selenographic coordinates 31.0°N 32.0°W, and has a maximum diameter of 201.50 km (125.21 mi). This cleft follows a generally east–west path across the Mare Imbrium. The section nearest Diophantus crater is partially filled with ejecta from that impact.

This formation named after the ancient Greek mathematician Diophantus (unkn-c. A.D. 300). His name was included in the lunar nomenclature of German selenographer Johann H. von Mädler during the 19th century. Its designation was formally adopted by the International Astronomical Union in 1935.

== Small craters ==
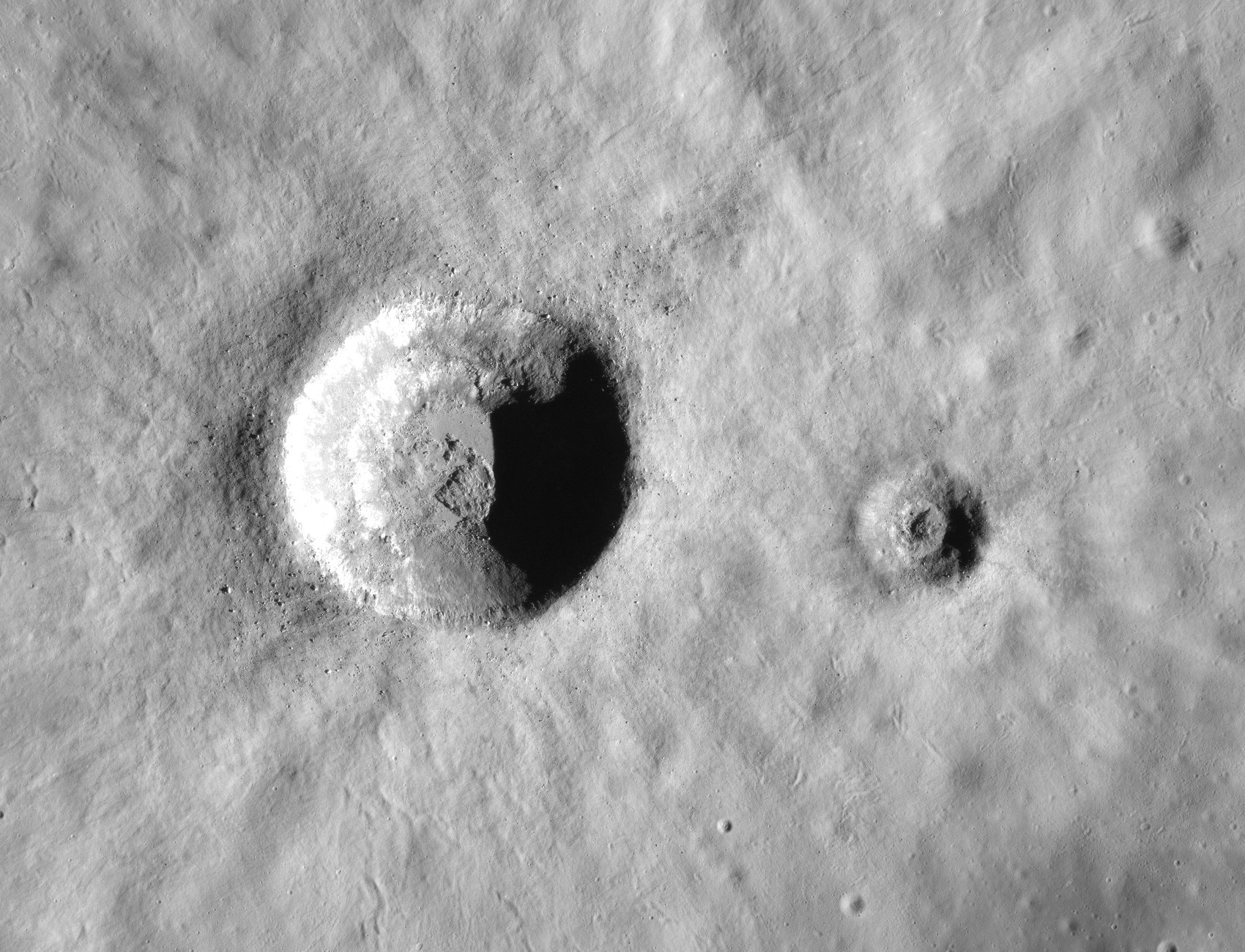
High-resolution image of Samir (left) and Louise from Apollo 15 panoramic camera.

Several tiny craters north of Diophantus have been assigned names by the IAU. These are listed in the table below.

Crater	Coordinates	Diameter	Name source
Isabel	28.2°N 34.1°W	1 km	Spanish feminine name
Louise	28.5°N 34.2°W	0.8 km	French feminine name
Samir	28.5°N 34.3°W	2 km	Arabic masculine name
Walter^{1}	28.0°N 33.8°W	1 km	German masculine name

^{1}	Not to be confused with the large crater Walther in the southern hemisphere, which is misidentified as 'Walter' in some publications

The crater Samir has bright rays that extend for over 70 km.

== Satellite craters ==
By convention these features are identified on lunar maps by placing the letter on the side of the crater midpoint that is closest to Diophantus.

Diophantus	Latitude	Longitude	Diameter
B	29.1° N	32.5° W	6 km
C	27.3° N	34.7° W	5 km
D	26.9° N	36.3° W	4 km

The following crater has been renamed by the IAU.

- Diophantus A — See Artsimovich.

== Gallery ==
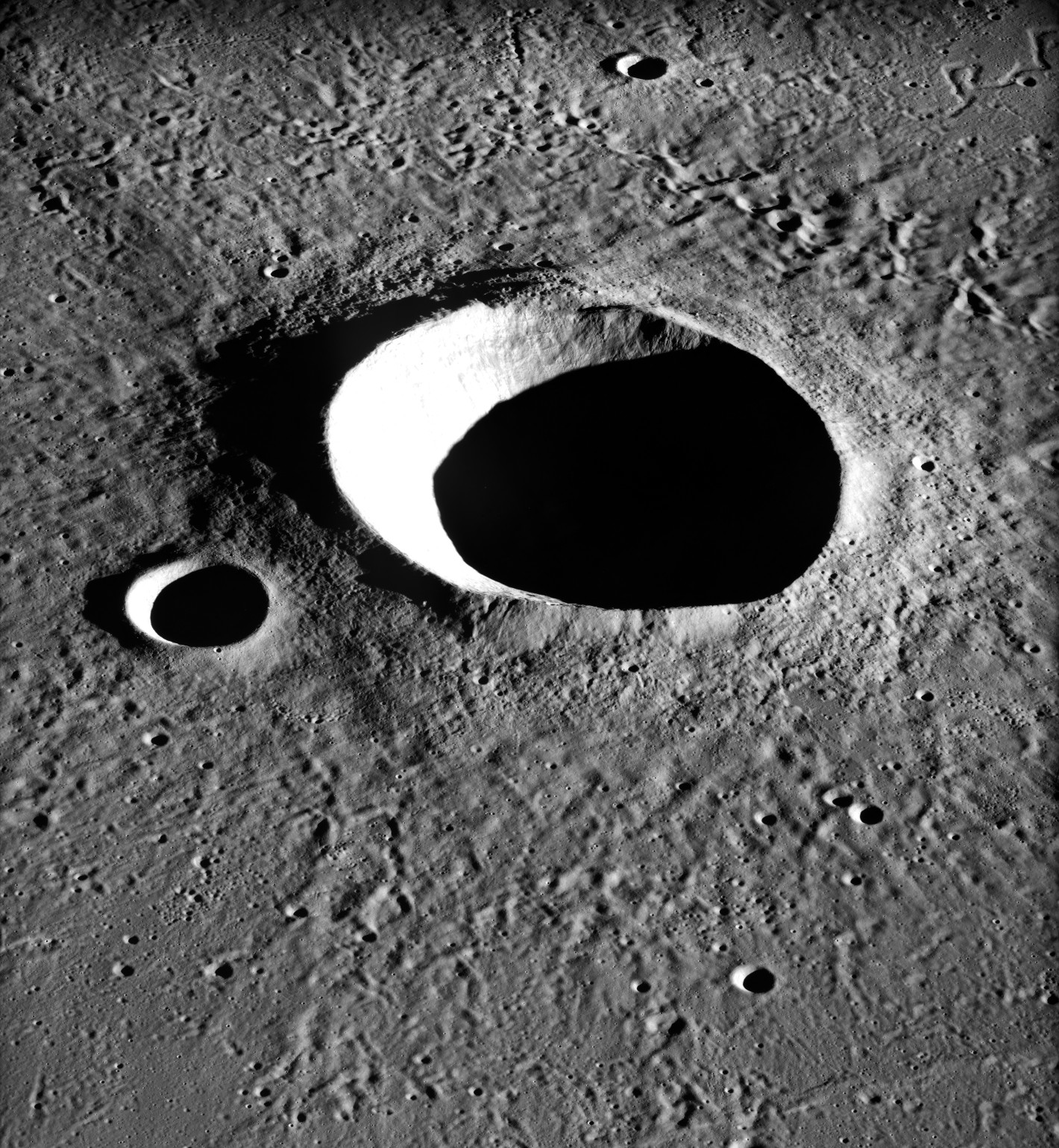
Oblique view of Diophantus from Apollo 17, at low sun angle, with the smaller Diophantus C at left.

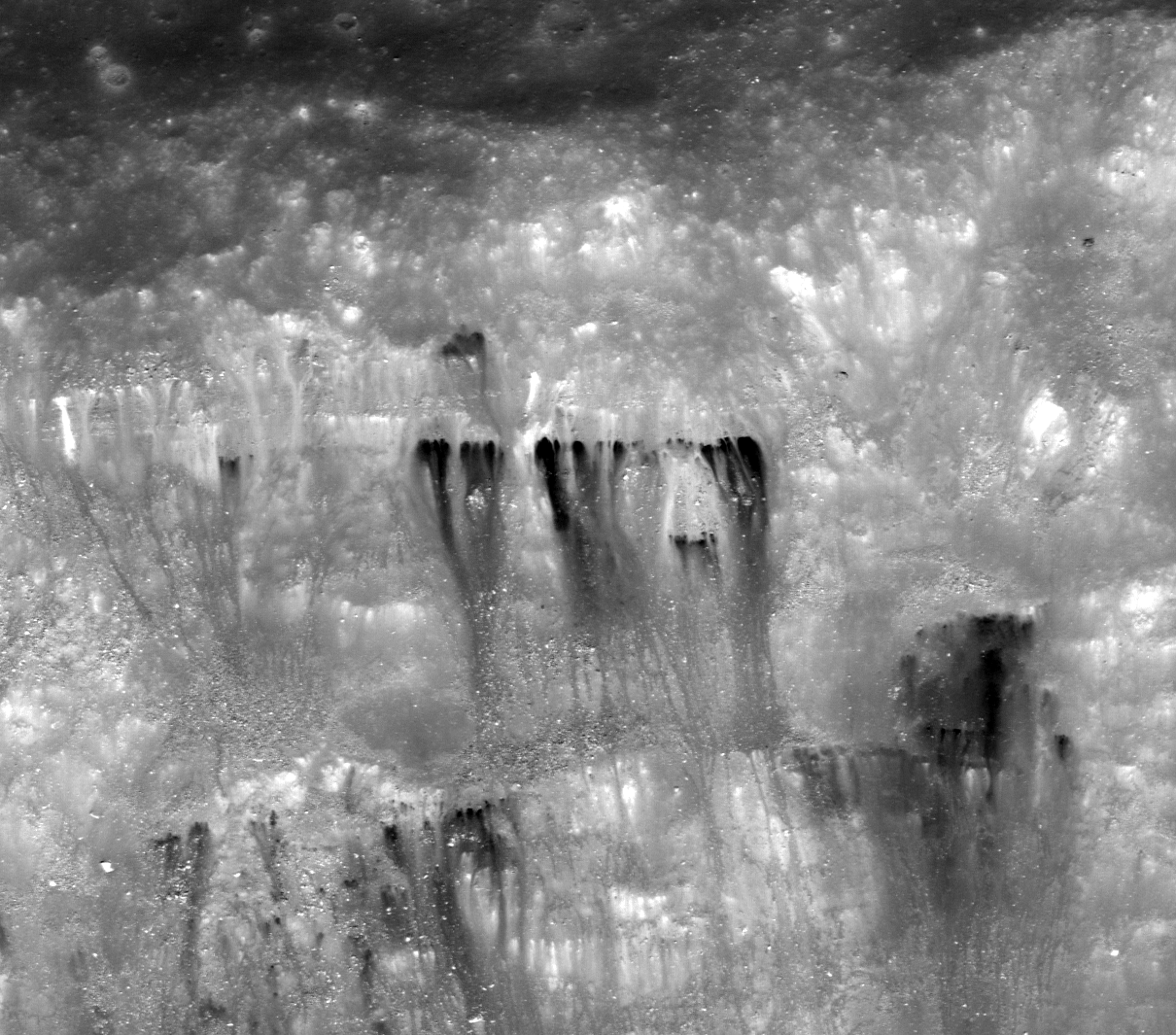
View of dark streaks in the wall of Diophantus, showing downslope movement of buried subsurface deposits.

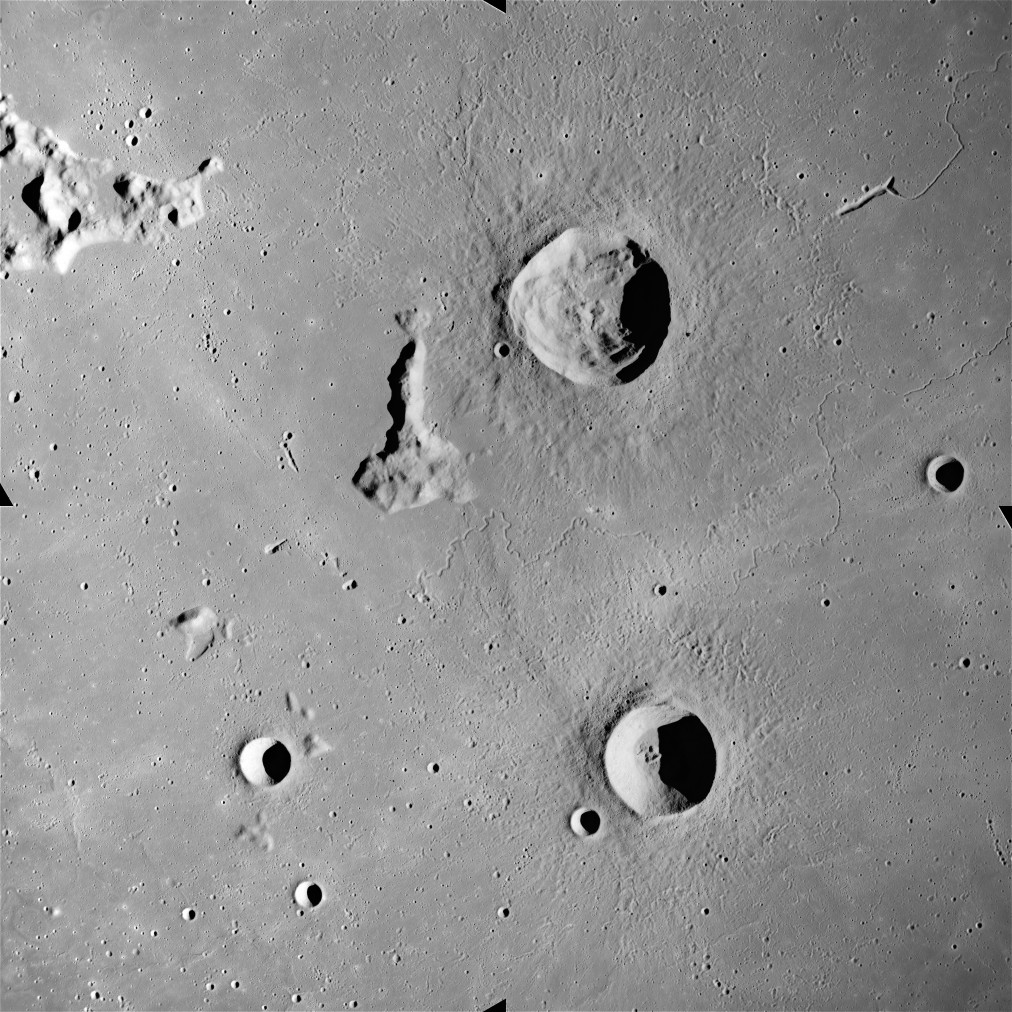
Surroundings of the craters Delisle (above) and Diophantus (below) from Apollo 15.
