= Eduard Heis =

German mathematician and astronomer

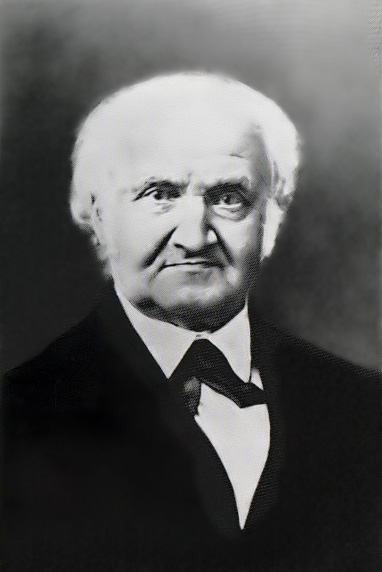
Eduard Heis

Eduard Heis (18 February 1806, Cologne – 30 June 1877 in Münster) was a German mathematician and astronomer.

He completed his education at the University of Bonn in 1827, then taught mathematics at a school in Cologne. In 1832 he taught at Aachen, and remained there until 1852. He was then appointed by King Frederick William IV to a chair position at the Academy of Münster in 1852. In 1869 he became rector of the academy.

While at the academy he made a series of observations of the night sky, including the Milky Way, zodiacal light, stars, and shooting stars. These were published in the following works, among others:

- Atlas Coelestis Novus, Cologne, 1872.
- Zodiakal-Beobachtungen.
- Sternschnuppen-Beobachtungen.
- De Magnitudine, 1852.

His star atlas, which was based on Argelander's Uranometria Nova (1843), helped define the selection of constellations in the northern sky that was officially adopted by the International Astronomical Union in 1922. His other publications included a treatise on the eclipses during the Peloponnesian War, Halley's Comet, and some mathematical text books.

He was also the first person to record a count of the Perseid meteor shower in 1839, giving an hourly rate of 160. Observers have recorded the hourly count every year since that time.

== Awards and honors ==
- Order of the Red Eagle, 1870.
- Awarded doctor honoris causa by Bonn University, 1852.
- Foreign associate, Royal Astronomical Society of London, 1874.
- Honorary member, Leopoldine Academy, 1877.
- Honorary member, Scientific Society of Brussels, 1877.
- The crater Heis on the Moon is named after him.
