= Dorsum Heim =

Wrinkle ridge on the Moon

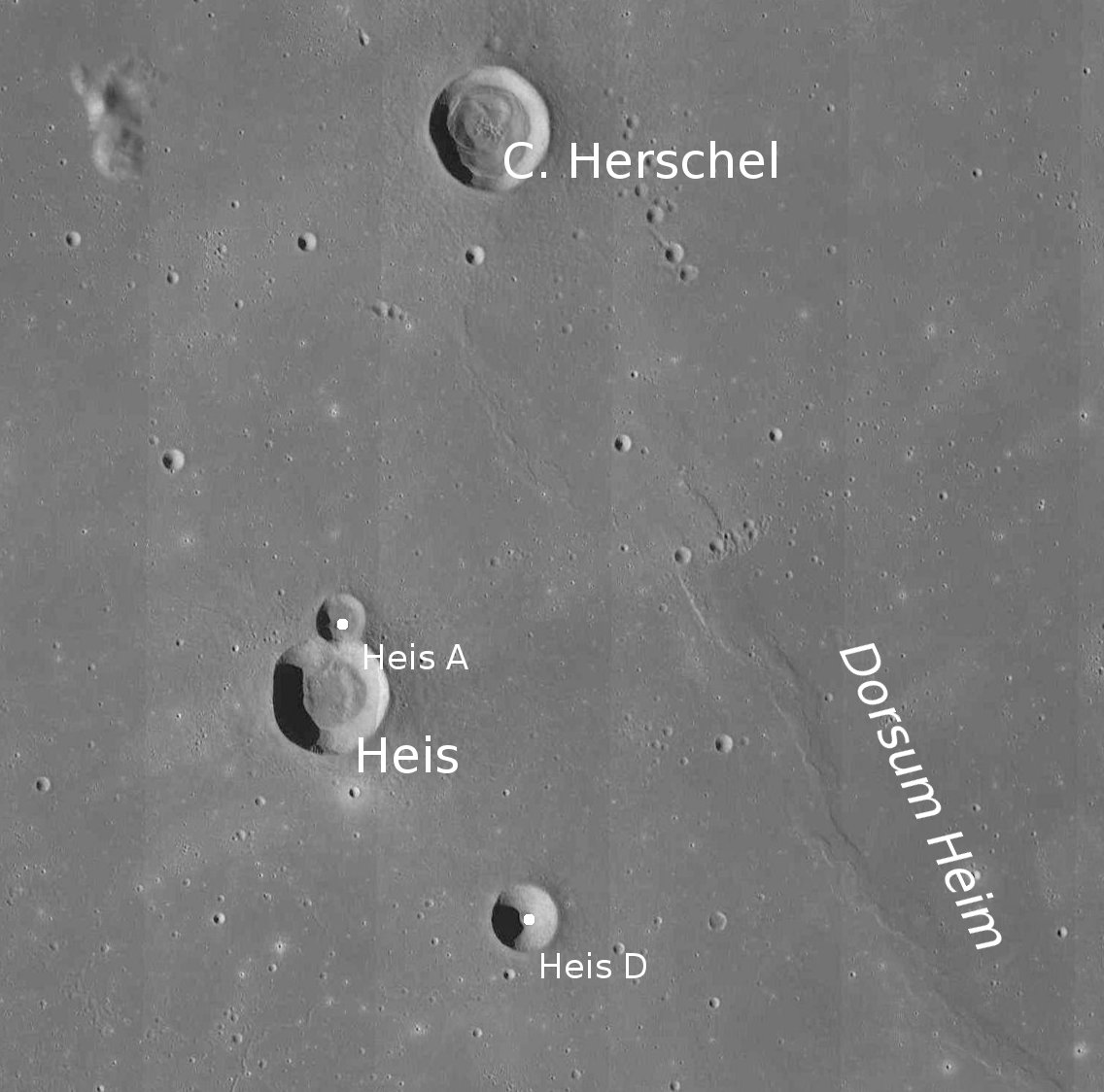
Dorsum Heim is on the right the photo that includes the craters of C. Herschel and Heis

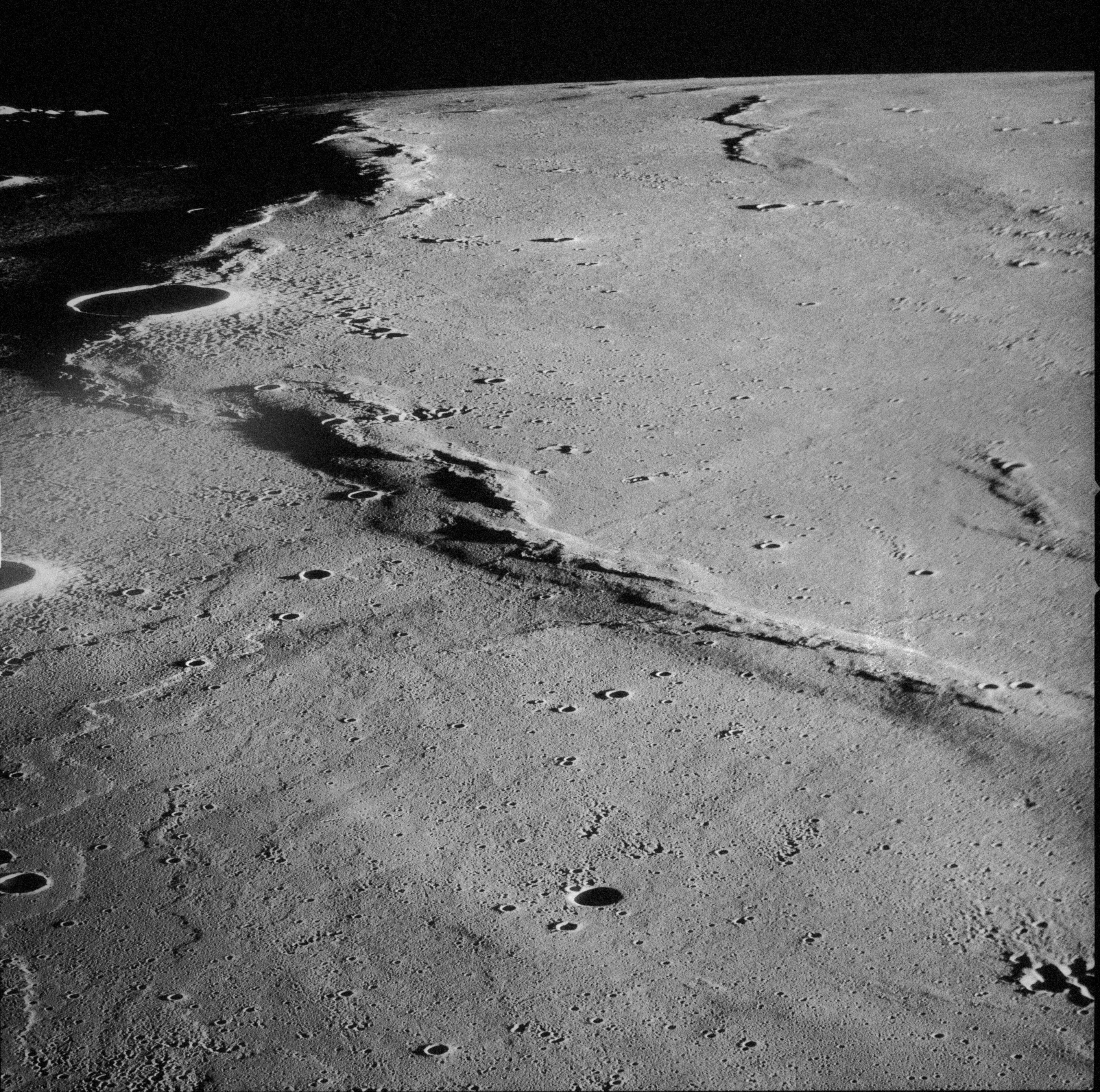
Oblique view from Apollo 17

Dorsum Heim is a wrinkle ridge in Mare Imbrium on the Moon. It is 148 km long and was named after Swiss geologist Albert Heim in 1976.
