= Delisle (crater) =

Crater on the Moon

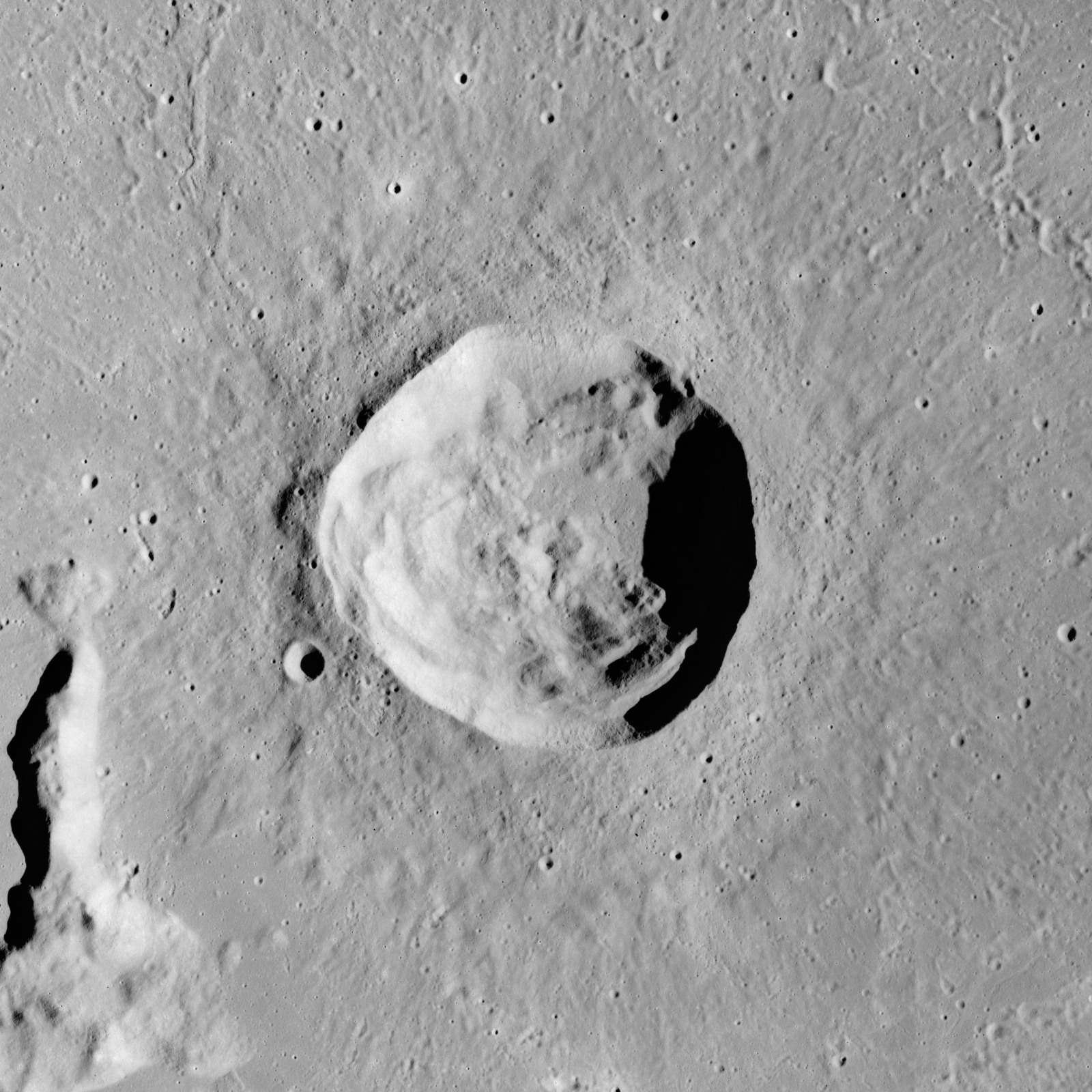
- Apollo 15 image
- Coordinates: 29.9°N 34.6°W
- Diameter: 24.83 km (15.43 mi)
- Depth: 2.42 km (1.50 mi)
- Colongitude: 35° at sunrise
- Formation: Eratosthenian
- Eponym: Joseph-Nicolas Delisle

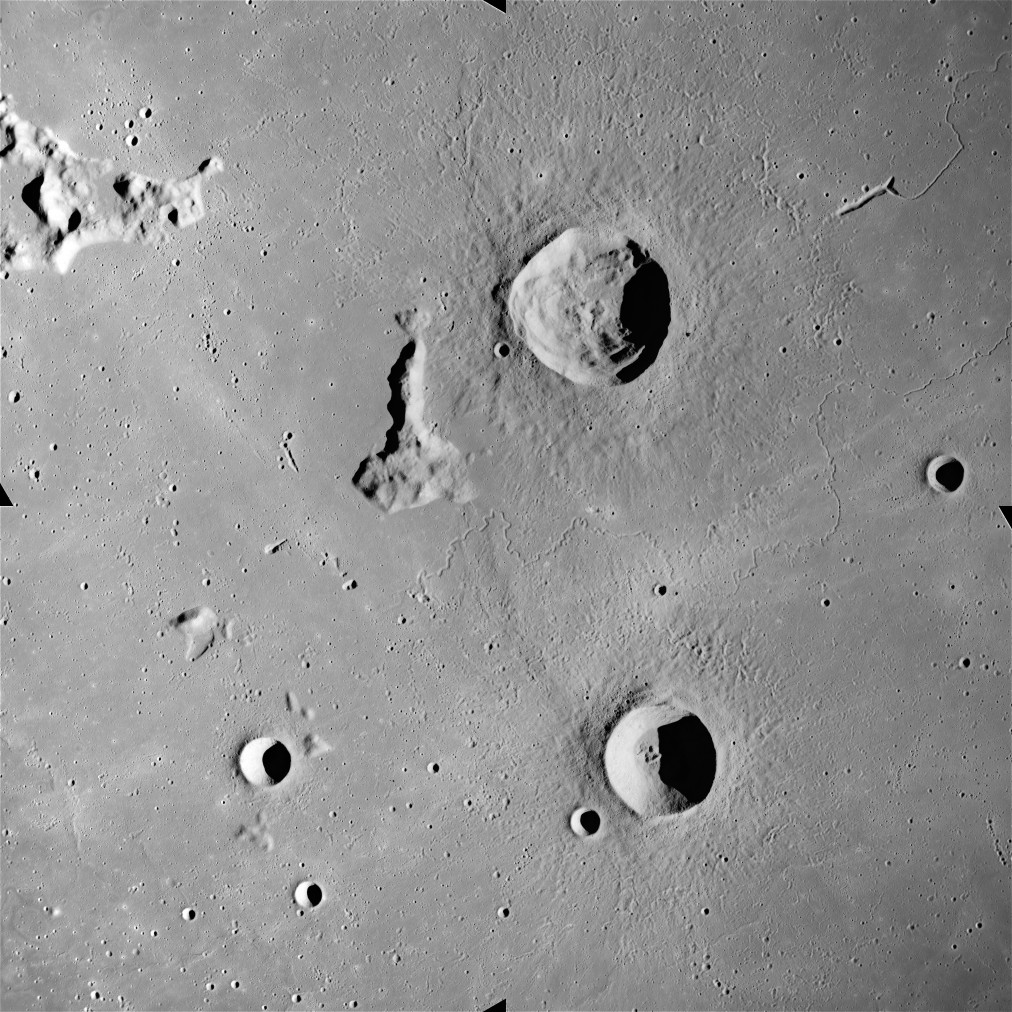
The lunar craters Delisle (above) and Diophantus (below) from Apollo 15. NASA photo.

Delisle is a small lunar impact crater in the western part of the Mare Imbrium. It lies to the north of the crater Diophantus, and just to the northwest of the ridge designated Mons Delisle. Between Delisle and Diophantus is a sinuous rille named Rima Diophantus, with a diameter of 150 km. To the northeast is another rille designated Rima Delisle, named after this crater.

On the lunar geologic timescale, Delisle dates to the Eratosthenian period. It formed in the basaltic lava flows of Mare Imbrium and has not been significantly modified by subsequent processes. The rim of Delisle is somewhat polygonal in form and it has a low central rise on the floor. There is some slight slumping along the inner wall, but overall the rim is still relatively fresh with little appearance of significant wear. The outer rim is surrounded by a rampart and skirt of hummocky terrain, formed from the impact ejecta.

This formation is named after French astronomer Joseph-Nicolas Delisle (1688-1768). His name was included in the lunar nomenclature of German amateur astronomer Johann H. Schröter as "de l'Isle" in 1791. Its modern designation was officially adopted by the International Astronomical Union in 1935. However, some sources continue to use the older name style.

== Rima Delisle ==
This is a sinuous rille centered on selenographic coordinates 30.87° N, 32.35° W. It occupies a maximum diameter of 57.60 km. Three tiny craters in the vicinity of this feature have been assigned names by the IAU. These are listed in the table below.

Crater	Longitude	Latitude	Diameter	Name source
Boris	30.6° N	33.5° W	4 km	Russian masculine name
Gaston	30.9° N	34.0° W	2 km	French masculine name
Linda	30.7° N	33.4° W	1 km	Spanish feminine name

== Satellite craters ==
By convention these features are identified on lunar maps by placing the letter on the side of the crater midpoint that is closest to Delisle.

Delisle	Latitude	Longitude	Diameter
K	29.0° N	38.4° W	3 km
