= Soviet Union and weapons of mass destruction =

Soviet Union
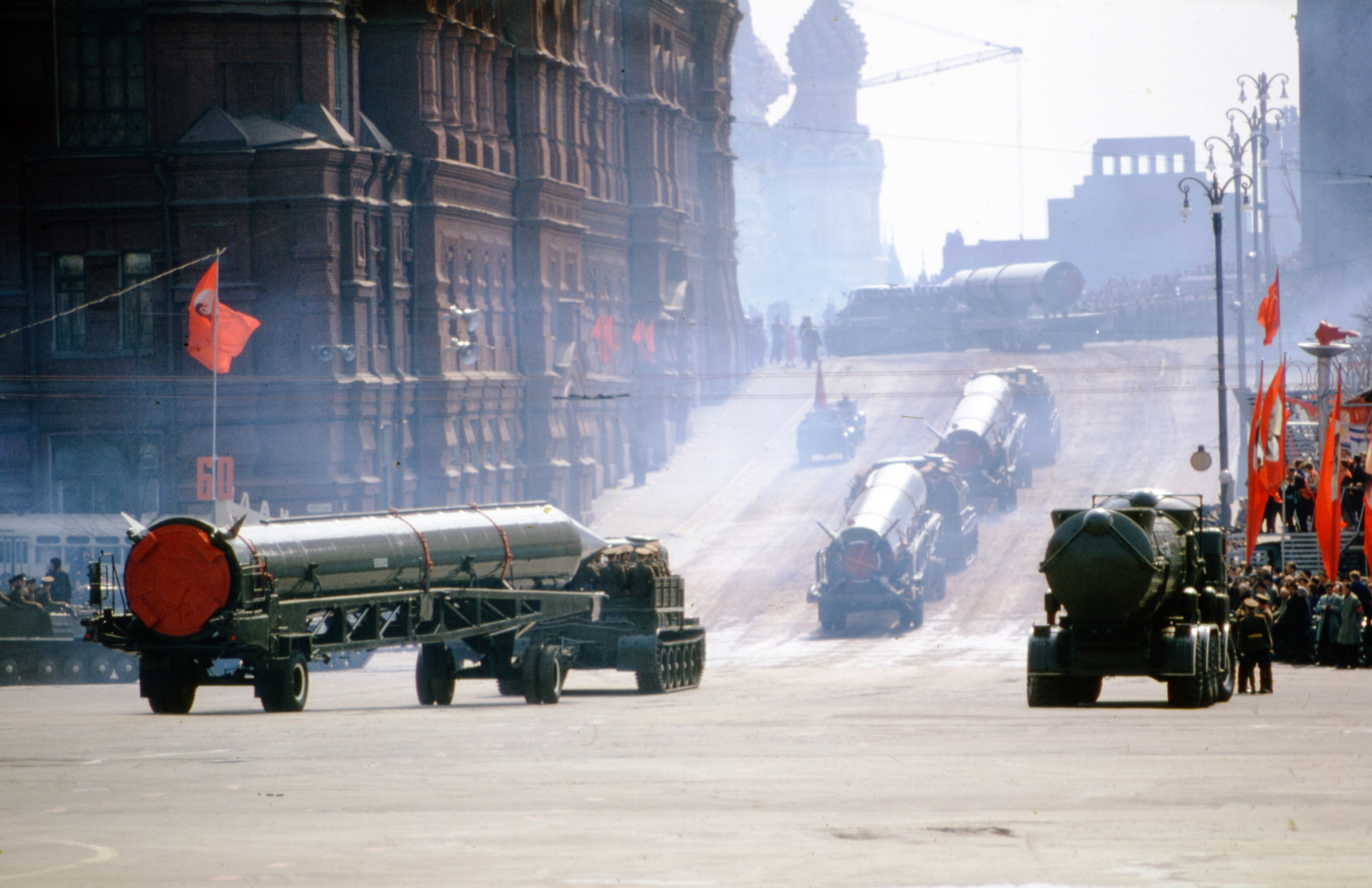
- R-12 medium-range ballistic missiles in Red Square, Moscow, 1964

- Nuclear program start date: 1942
- First nuclear weapon test: August 29, 1949
- First thermonuclear weapon test: November 22, 1955
- Last nuclear test: October 24, 1990
- Largest yield test: 50 Mt (210 PJ): Atmospheric – 50 Mt (30 October 1961); Underground – 140 Kt (January 15, 1965)
- Total tests: 715 detonations
- Peak stockpile: 45,000 warheads (1986)
- Nuclear triad: Yes: Intercontinental ballistic missiles (RT-2PM Topol); Submarine-launched ballistic missiles (Typhoon-class submarine); Strategic bombers (Tupolev Tu-22M and Tupolev Tu-95)
- NPT party: Yes (1968, one of five recognized powers)

The Soviet Union had, by 1991, the world's largest stockpiles of nuclear, biological, and chemical weapons. It carried out its first nuclear test in 1949 and its first multi-stage thermonuclear test in 1955. It was one of the five nuclear-weapon states of the Non-Proliferation Treaty, and its biological weapons program proceeded despite its ratification of the Biological Weapons Convention. These programs were inherited primarily by Russia.

In 1991, the Soviet Union possessed approximately 29,000 nuclear warheads. The Soviet Armed Forces operated a nuclear triad that deployed over 10,000 strategic nuclear weapons: 6,280 warheads assigned to the Strategic Rocket Forces' 1,334 intercontinental ballistic missiles, 3,626 warheads to the Soviet Navy's 914 submarine-launched ballistic missiles, and 974 cruise missiles and bombs to Long Range Aviation's 106 Tu-95MS and Tu-160 bombers.

The Soviet Union conducted 715 nuclear tests, second only to the United States. These were primarily at Semipalatinsk Test Site, and Novaya Zemlya, where the most powerful nuclear test ever, the Tsar Bomba at 50 megatons, was conducted in 1961. The Soviet Union, with the US and UK, joined the 1963 Partial Nuclear Test Ban Treaty banning non-underground tests. Its nuclear weapons infrastructure saw many radioactive contamination events; the 1957 Kyshtym disaster remains the worst military accident on the International Nuclear and Radiological Event Scale.

The global Cold War saw many nuclear crises. During the 1962 Cuban Missile Crisis, Soviet nuclear warheads and missiles were briefly stationed in Cuba, often considered the closest call with World War III. Nuclear tensions again crescendoed during the 1969 Sino-Soviet border conflict, as Soviet leadership threatened a massive nuclear attack on China. Soviet nuclear weapons were also stationed in the Warsaw Pact countries of Czechoslovakia, East Germany, Hungary, and Poland, as well as Mongolia and potentially Egypt.

Following the December 1991 dissolution of the Union, tactical warheads stationed across post-Soviet states were withdrawn to Russia by May 1992. Strategic warheads between Belarus, Ukraine, and Kazakhstan were also withdrawn by 1996, under the Lisbon Protocol and Budapest Memorandum.

The Soviet chemical weapons program became the largest in world history. Russia in 1993 declared almost 40,000 tons of chemical weapons. The program produced Novichok, VR, sarin, and soman nerve agents, as well as lewisite, mustard, and phosgene, and others. In 1978, Bulgarian dissident Georgi Markov was killed in London, allegedly with the toxin ricin, by Bulgaria's State Security with the aid of the Soviet KGB.

The Soviet biological weapons program was the world's largest, longest, and most sophisticated biological warfare project. It weaponized and stockpiled the biological agents that cause anthrax, plague, tularemia, smallpox, botulism and others. Genetic engineering improved agent stability and antibiotic resistance. The program employed a peak of 65,000 people and annually produced, for example, 100 tons of smallpox. The Sverdlovsk anthrax leak, which led to at least 68 deaths, began to reveal the extent of the program, continued by defectors including Ken Alibek and Vladimir Pasechnik.

== Nuclear weapons ==
=== Delivery systems ===
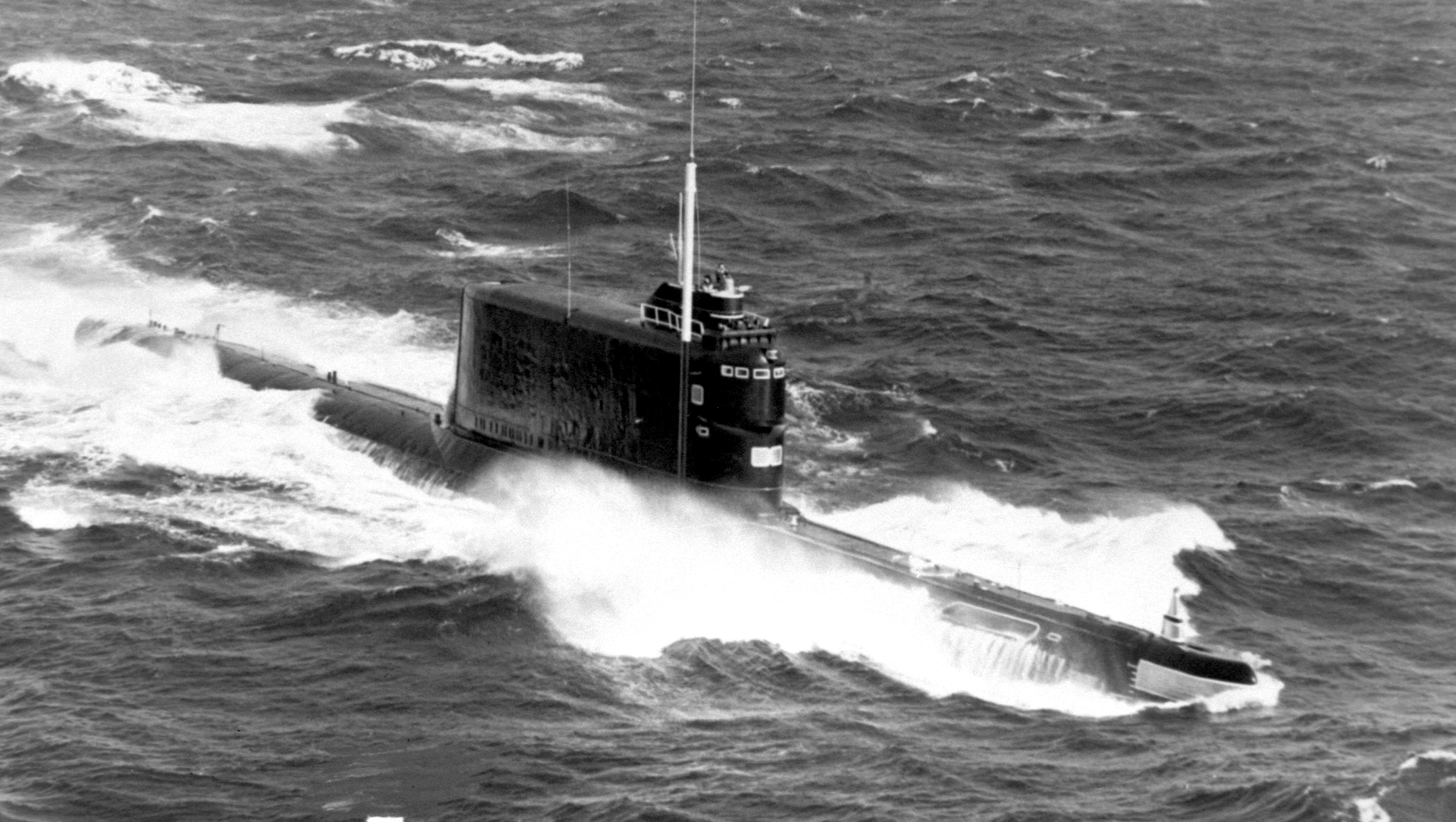
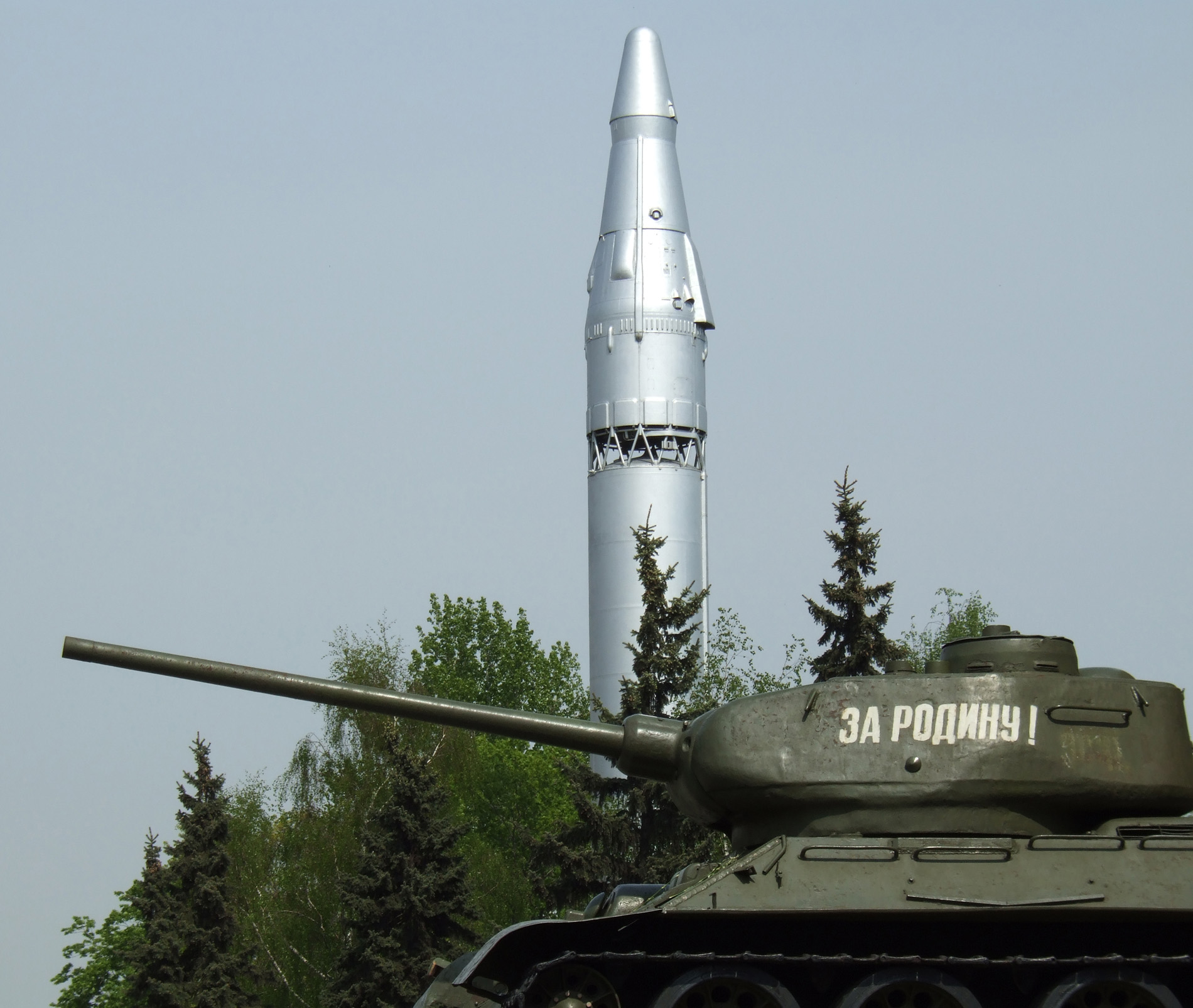
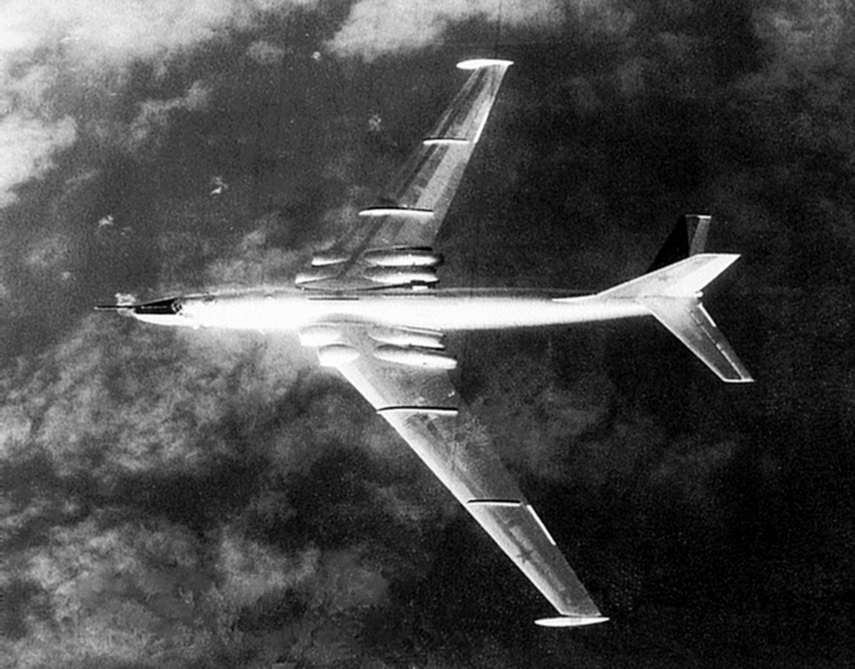
The early Soviet nuclear triad – a Project 629 SSB, an R-9 ICBM and a Myasishchev M-4 strategic bomber
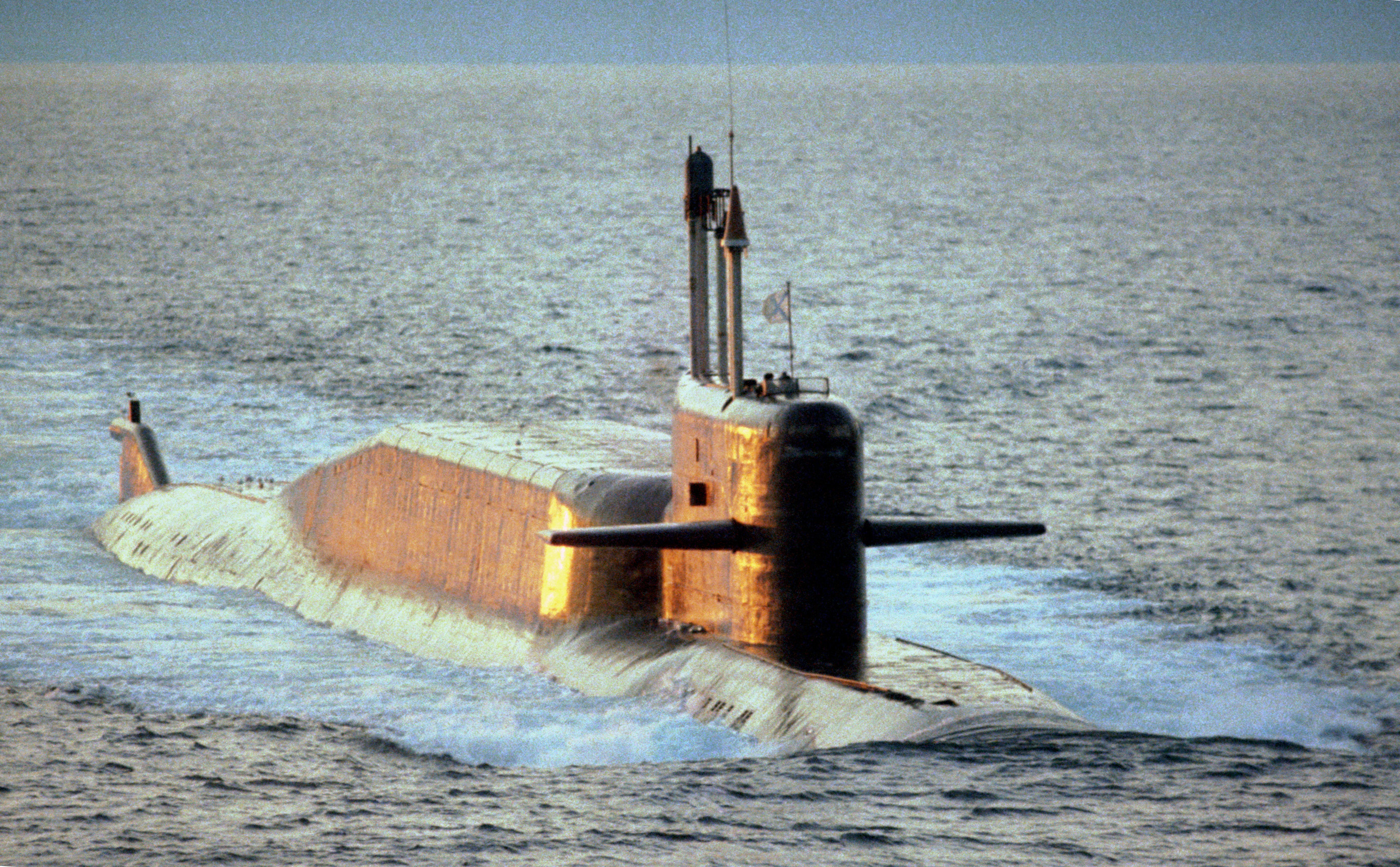
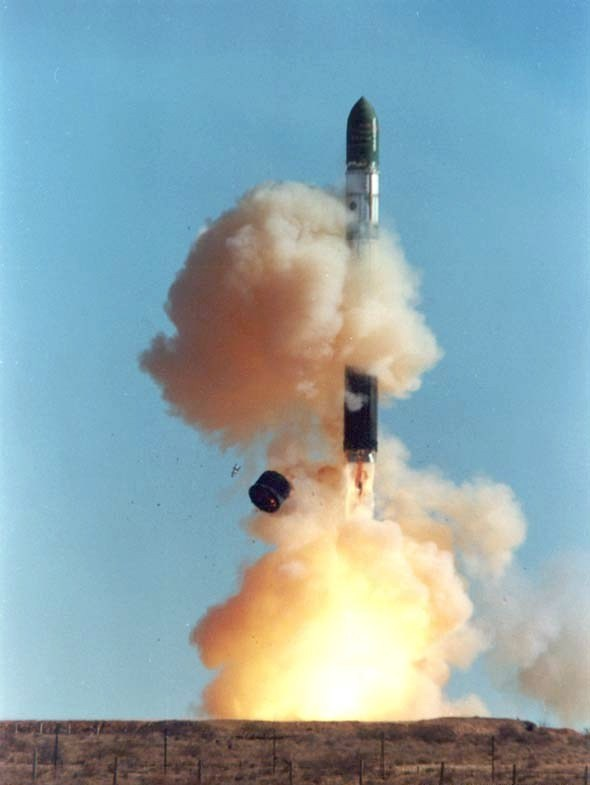
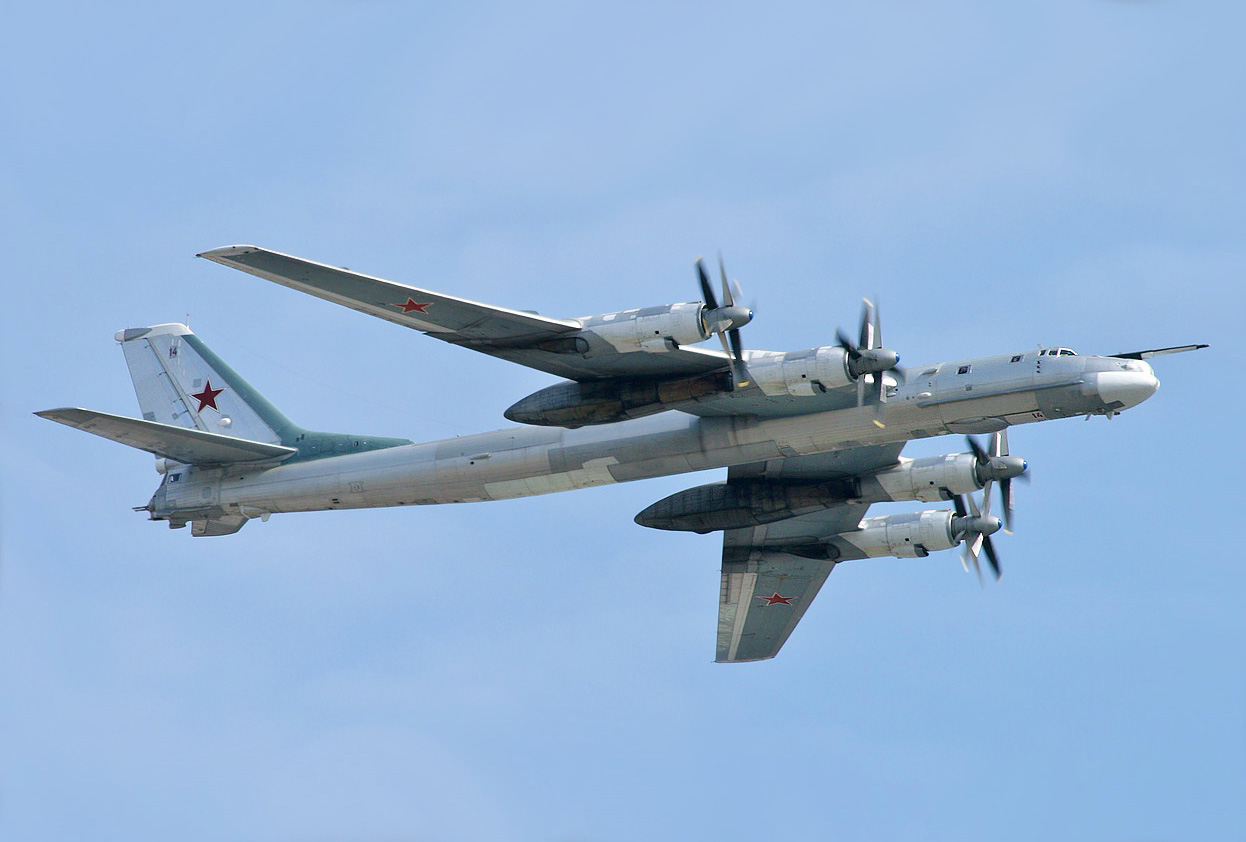
The late Soviet nuclear triad – a Project 667BDRM Delfin SSBN, an R-36M2 ICBM and a Tupolev Tu-95 strategic bomber

==== Strategic ====
In 1991, the USSR possessed approximately 29,000 nuclear warheads. The Soviet Armed Forces operated a nuclear triad that deployed over 10,000 strategic nuclear weapons: 6,280 warheads assigned to the Strategic Rocket Forces' 1,334 intercontinental ballistic missiles, 3,626 warheads to the Soviet Navy's 914 submarine-launched ballistic missiles, and 974 cruise missiles and bombs to Long Range Aviation's 106 Tu-95MS and Tu-160 bombers. Its most modern strategic missiles were the land-based RT-2PM Topol, RT-23 Molodets, and UR-100N, and submarine-based R-29RM, R-39, and R-29.

An estimated 3,000 nuclear weapons tipped surface-to-air missiles, and 100 tipped the ABM-1 and ABM-3 anti-ballistic missile systems around the capital city Moscow.

==== Tactical ====
Another 11,000 tactical nuclear weapons were assigned to land and naval tactical aircraft, missiles, nuclear artillery, and anti-submarine weapons including torpedoes and depth charges.

Tactical nuclear missiles included the R-17 Elbrus, 9K52 Luna-M, and OTR-21 Tochka. The largest nuclear artillery, 240 mm diameter, were delivered by the M240 towed mortar and 2S4 Tyulpan self-propelled mortar.

Tactical nuclear aircraft included the Mikoyan MiG-27, Sukhoi Su-24 and Su-17 fighters, maritime patrol Beriev Be-12, Ilyushin Il-38, and Tu-142, carrier-based Kamov Ka-27 and Ka-25 helicopters, and Kiev-class carrier-based Yakovlev Yak-38 vertical take-off and landing fighter. The think tank SIPRI considered the long-range bombers the Tu-22M, Tu-95K22, Tu-22 and Tu-16 to be assigned only "non-strategic" warheads, although these aircraft are sometimes considered strategic.

=== Early development ===
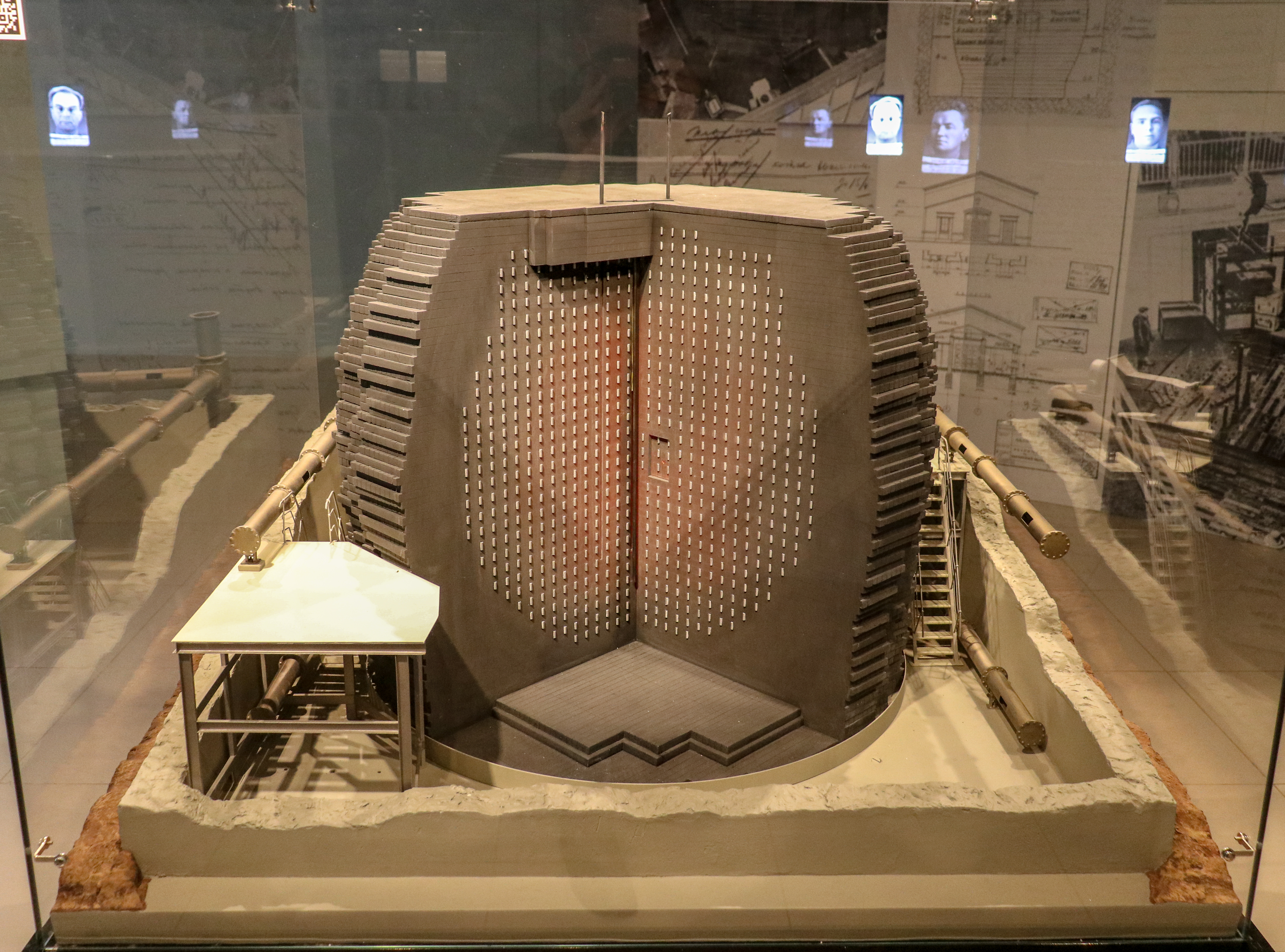
Model of F-1, which was the first nuclear reactor in the USSR and outside North America, operated at Laboratory No. 2 from late 1946.

The Soviet atomic bomb project was authorized by Joseph Stalin in the Soviet Union to develop nuclear weapons during and after World War II.

Physicist Georgy Flyorov, suspecting a Western Allied nuclear program, urged Stalin to start research in 1942. Early efforts were made at Laboratory No. 2 in Moscow, led by Igor Kurchatov, and by Soviet-sympathizing atomic spies in the US Manhattan Project. Subsequent efforts involved plutonium production at Mayak in Chelyabinsk and weapon research and assembly at KB-11 in Sarov.

After Stalin learned of the atomic bombings of Hiroshima and Nagasaki, the nuclear program was accelerated through intelligence gathering on the US and German nuclear weapon programs. Espionage coups, especially via Klaus Fuchs and David Greenglass, included detailed descriptions of the implosion-type Fat Man bomb and plutonium production. In the final months of the war, the Soviet "Russian Alsos" task force competed against the Western Allies' Alsos Mission to capture German and Austrian nuclear scientists and material, including refined uranium and cyclotrons. The Soviet project utilized East German industry for further uranium mining, refinement, and instrument manufacture. Lavrentiy Beria was placed in charge of the atomic project, and the replication of the Fat Man bomb was prioritized.

The Manhattan Project had established a monopoly on the global uranium market. The Soviet project relied on SAG Wismut in East Germany and the development of the Taboshar mine in Tajikistan. Domestic large-scale production of high purity graphite and high purity uranium metal, to construct plutonium production reactors, was a significant challenge.

In late 1946, F-1, the first nuclear reactor outside North America, achieved criticality at Laboratory No. 2. In mid-1948, the A-1 plutonium production reactor became operational at the Mayak site, and in mid-1949, the first plutonium metal was separated. The first nuclear weapon was assembled at the KB-11 design bureau, led by Yulii Khariton, in the closed city of Arzamas-16 (Sarov).

On 29 August 1949, the Soviet Union secretly conducted its first weapon test, RDS-1, at the Semipalatinsk Test Site of the Kazakh SSR. Simultaneously, project scientists had been developing conceptual thermonuclear weapons. The US detection of the test, via anticipatory atmospheric fallout monitoring, led to a US crash program to develop thermonuclear weapons, opening of the nuclear arms race of the Cold War.

Boosted fission and multi-stage thermonuclear weapons were developed during the 1950s, testing expanded to Novaya Zemlya and Kapustin Yar, and fissile material production sites grew, including the invention of the gas centrifuge. In 1961 and 1962 the program conducted the five most powerful nuclear tests ever; the 1963 Partial Test Ban Treaty moved Soviet nuclear testing underground. The program created demand for nuclear weapons delivery, command and control, and early warning, influencing the Soviet space program. Soviet nuclear weapons played a major role in the Cold War, including the Cuban Missile Crisis, and the Sino-Soviet border conflict.

=== Production sites ===
Three sites in the Russian SFSR produced 125.2 tons of weapons-grade plutonium from 1948 to 1991, with a consistent production peak between 1967 and 1989. Following the Moscow test reactor F-1 in 1946, the Mayak site in Chelyabinsk-40 began construction. The first plutonium production reactor A-1 began operation in 1948, fuelling the RDS-1 test. The Mayak site received nine further reactors were constructed. Of these, four were used for plutonium production, the other six reactors primarily produced tritium for thermonuclear weapons. Plutonium was also produced by five reactors at the Siberian Chemical Combine in Tomsk-7, and three reactors at the Mining and Chemical Combine in Krasnoyarsk-26. In this period, Mayak produced 30.9 tons, the Siberian Chemical Combine produced 54.9 tons, and the Mining and Chemical Combine produced 39.4 tons.

Russian sites ultimately produced 1,250 tons of highly enriched uranium (uncertainty ±120 tons) from 1949 to 2010, excluding HEU produced for naval nuclear reactors. Of this, 500 tons was downblended by the Megatons to Megawatts Program, and a further hundred tons were used in production research reactors, nuclear tests, and other downblending programs. Russia is now believed to possess 656 tons between HEU stockpiles and HEU inside weapons themselves. This began with the SU-20 electromagnetic separation plant, but the Soviet project quickly followed the Manhattan Project's gaseous diffusion scheme, constructing the D-1 plant in Sverdlovsk-44, eventually becoming the Ural Electrochemical Combine. The D-1 plant could produce 0.01 million SWU/year. The development of the gas centrifuge and waves of modernizations brought the Ural Electrochemical Combine to 11.9 million SWU/year by 1993. Further enrichment plants were built at the Siberian Chemical Combine, the Zelenogorsk Electrochemical Plant and the Angarsk Electrochemical Combine.

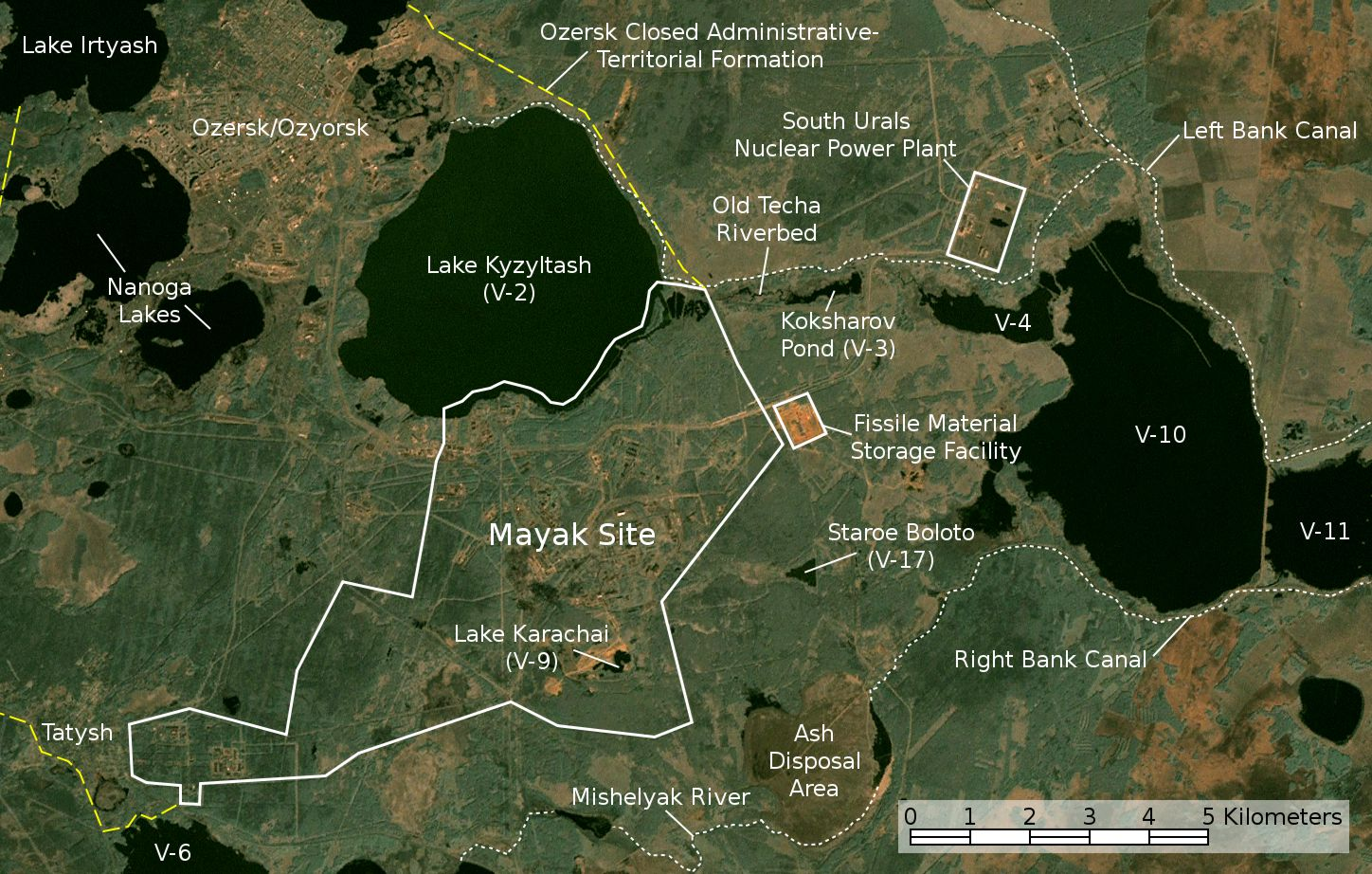
Satellite imagery of Mayak, a major production site of plutonium and tritium for nuclear weapons during the Soviet era.

=== Nuclear testing ===
The Soviet Union used three major test sites: Semipalatinsk in Kazakhstan, Novaya Zemlya in the extreme north, and Kapustin Yar.

Notable tests at Semipalatinsk following RDS-1 include RDS-4, the first Soviet tactical nuclear weapon, RDS-6s, the first Soviet weapon to use thermonuclear reactions in a layer cake design, sometimes called a boosted fission weapon, and RDS-37, the first Soviet true two-stage thermonuclear weapon.

Novaya Zemlya was the site of further megaton-range explosions, including the Tsar Bomba, the largest weapon ever detonated, and the Raduga live test of an R-13 submarine-launched ballistic missile. Kapustin Yar was used for high-altitude nuclear tests launched by missiles, including the 1961 tests and Project K tests.

The Soviet Army also conducted the Totskoye nuclear exercise in Orenburg Oblast, 1954, in which 45,000 soldiers and hundreds of tanks, self-propelled guns, and armored personnel carriers were maneuvered through the blast zone of an RDS-4 nuclear bomb. After the 1963 Partial Nuclear Test Ban Treaty, underground testing continued at Semipalatinsk and Novaya Zemlya until 1990. The Soviet Union also developed "clean" thermonuclear weapons, including weapons with only deuterium as thermonuclear fuel, used in a brief program of peaceful nuclear explosions.

=== Espionage and intelligence gathering ===
During the Eisenhower administration, the US believed that successful aerial reconnaissance of the Soviet Union's nuclear facilities would be more likely than successful human intelligence. Thus it deployed a range of aircraft on overflights, including the Boeing RB-47 Stratojet and later the Lockheed U-2. A U-2 was famously shot down in 1960, causing international embarrassment to the US, after which it began transitioning to reconnaissance satellites. Under Project Genetrix in 1956, the US also launched high-altitude balloons for reconnaissance, which US Secretary of State John Foster Dulles justified saying "international law is obscure on the question of who owns the upper air".

The US also attempted a range of methods for a nuclear detonation detection system, including Project Grab Bag's air sampling balloons, and Project Mogul's infrasound monitoring balloons.

On 8 August 1974, the Central Intelligence Agency's Project Azorian obtained Soviet nuclear weapons in the form of nuclear torpedoes, from the sunken wreck of the Soviet submarine K-129 (1960). However, the raising ship Glomar Explorer lost the submarine's section containing the R-13 ballistic missiles and nuclear warheads, and codebooks and decoding machines.

In the late Cold War, the US developed a decapitation strike plan codenamed Canopy Wing, which would infiltrate and interfere with Soviet nuclear command and control in the event of conflict, including potentially supplying false commands to Soviet pilots via computer-generated voices.

=== Foreign stationing ===
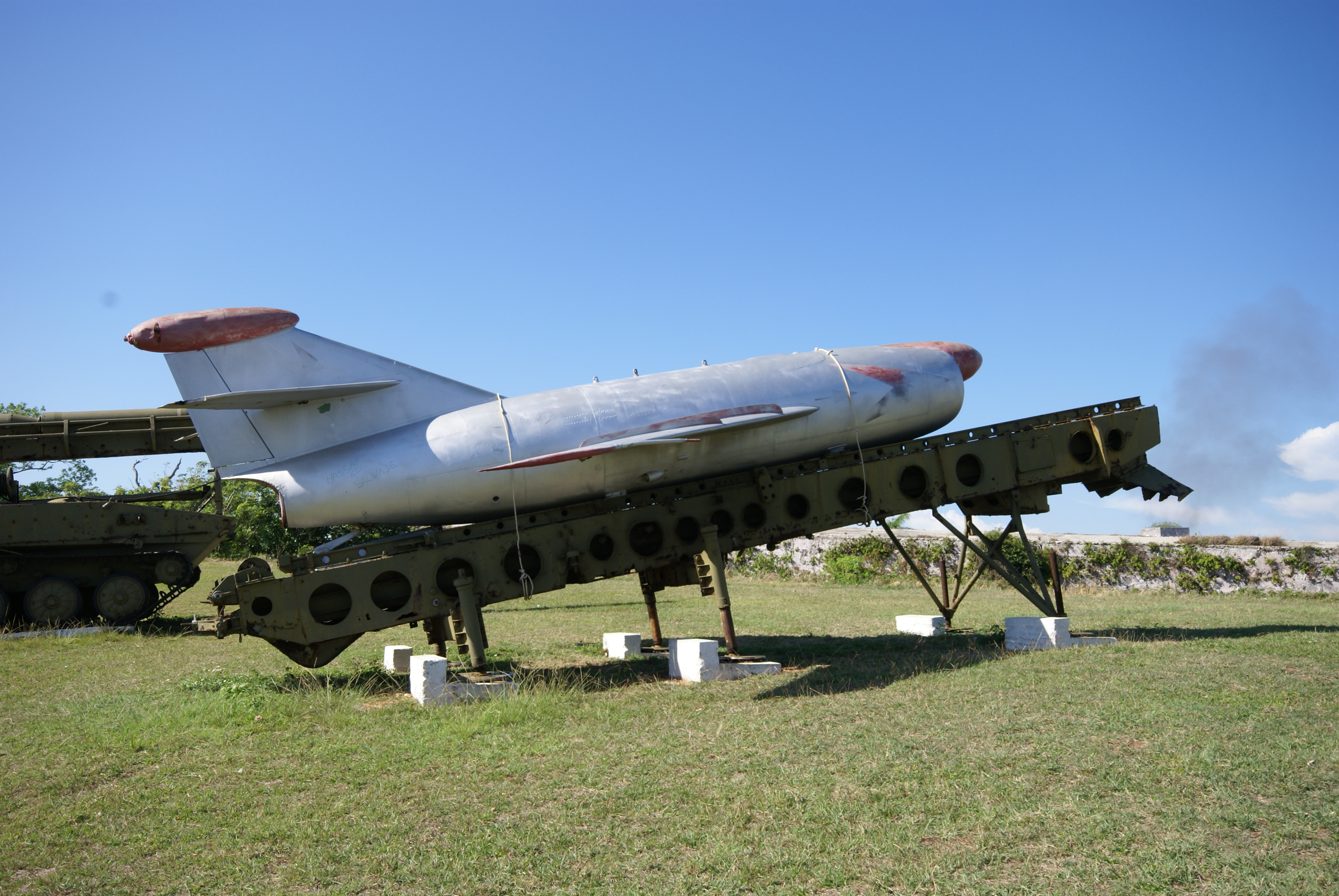
An FKR-1 nuclear cruise missile, one of the Soviet nuclear weapons deployed to Cuba during the 1962 Cuban Missile Crisis.

The Soviet Union practiced nuclear stationing during the Cold War, primarily with Warsaw Pact countries. It stationed nuclear weapons in East Germany, Czechoslovakia, Hungary, Poland, and Mongolia, as well as briefly in Cuba during the 1962 Cuban Missile Crisis.

==== Cuba ====
Under Operation Anadyr during the Cuban Missile Crisis, the Soviet Union brough an estimated 100 nuclear warheads to Cuba. Of these, 80 were assigned to FKR-1 cruise missiles, 12 to 9K52 Luna-M rocket, and 6 to 8 to R-12 Dvina missiles, although 42 Dvina missiles had been imported. Ilyushin Il-28 medium bombers had also been imported in crates, but were not unpacked, with 6 gravity bombs available to them.

==== Suspected stationing in Bulgaria ====
Approximately in 1985, the Soviet Union transferred a number of SS-23 intermediate-range missiles to Warsaw Pact allies East Germany, Czechoslovakia and Bulgaria. This was discovered in 1990, when a report from The Military Balance revealed the undisclosed transfers. Although this wasn't in violation of any treaty, it was implied by the INF Treaty that they would be destroyed. According to a Pentagon official, during negotiations, the Soviet Union denied transferring any intermediate-range missiles to Bulgaria. Following the discovery, the 1990 annual U.S. "Report on Soviet Noncompliance with Arms Control Agreements" described the non-disclosure as "negotiating fraud" but it wasn't deemed an outright violation of the treaty. The missiles were equipped with conventional war-heads, but equipping them with nuclear warheads wouldn't have been difficult. The missiles were destroyed in 2002 as a consequence of Bulgaria's bid to enter NATO.

This in conjunction with claims of USSR-Bulgarian nuclear weapon storage facilities, and alleged nuclear weapon release training from the Soviet Union to Bulgarian Air Force personnel have fueled the suspicion that Bulgaria could have been in possession of nuclear weapons at some point.

==== Other ====
In 1963, in the wake of the Cuban Missile Crisis, the Socialist Republic of Romania made a secret declaration to the United States that it did not host Soviet nuclear weapons, and that it would wish to remain neutral rather than uphold its Warsaw Pact obligations in the event of a superpower conflict.

Some historical evidence indicates during the 1973 Yom Kippur War, the Soviet Union deployed nuclear weapons to Egypt, including possibly providing two warheads to Soviet Scud missile brigades, as well as the typical nuclear weapons stored on ships and submarines of the 5th Operational Squadron based in Syria.

=== Crises ===
==== Cuban Missile Crisis ====
Universal Newsreel about the Cuban Missile Crisis

The Cuban Missile Crisis, also known as the October Crisis in Cuba (Spanish: Crisis de Octubre), or the Caribbean Crisis (Russian: Карибский кризис, romanized: Karibskiy krizis), was a 13-day confrontation between the governments of the United States and the Soviet Union, when American deployments of nuclear missiles in the United Kingdom, Italy and Turkey were matched by Soviet deployments of nuclear missiles in Cuba. The crisis lasted from 16 to 28 October 1962. The confrontation is widely considered the closest the Cold War came to escalating into full-scale nuclear war.

==== Sino-Soviet border conflict ====
In 1969, following the border conflict Battle of Zhenbao Island in March, the USSR considered a massive nuclear attack on China, targeting cities and nuclear facilities. It made military activity in the Russian Far East, and informed its allies and the United States of this potential attack. The Chinese government and archives were evacuated from Beijing while the People's Liberation Army scattered from its bases. The crisis abated when U.S. Secretary of State Henry Kissinger informed the Soviet Union that an attack on China would be met by a U.S. nuclear attack on 130 Soviet cities. According to the U.S. Department of State, one of the two main "after-the-fact explanations" for the Joint Chiefs of Staff Readiness Test conducted by the U.S. military in October 1969 was to deter a possible Soviet nuclear strike against the People's Republic of China.

=== Post-dissolution ===
Following the December 1991 dissolution of the Soviet Union, the hundreds of tactical warheads stationed in each of the fourteen other former Soviet republics were withdrawn to Russia by May 1992. The over two thousand strategic warheads, stationed between Belarus, Ukraine, and Kazakhstan, were withdrawn to Russia by November 1996, under the Lisbon Protocol and Budapest Memorandum.

== Chemical weapons ==
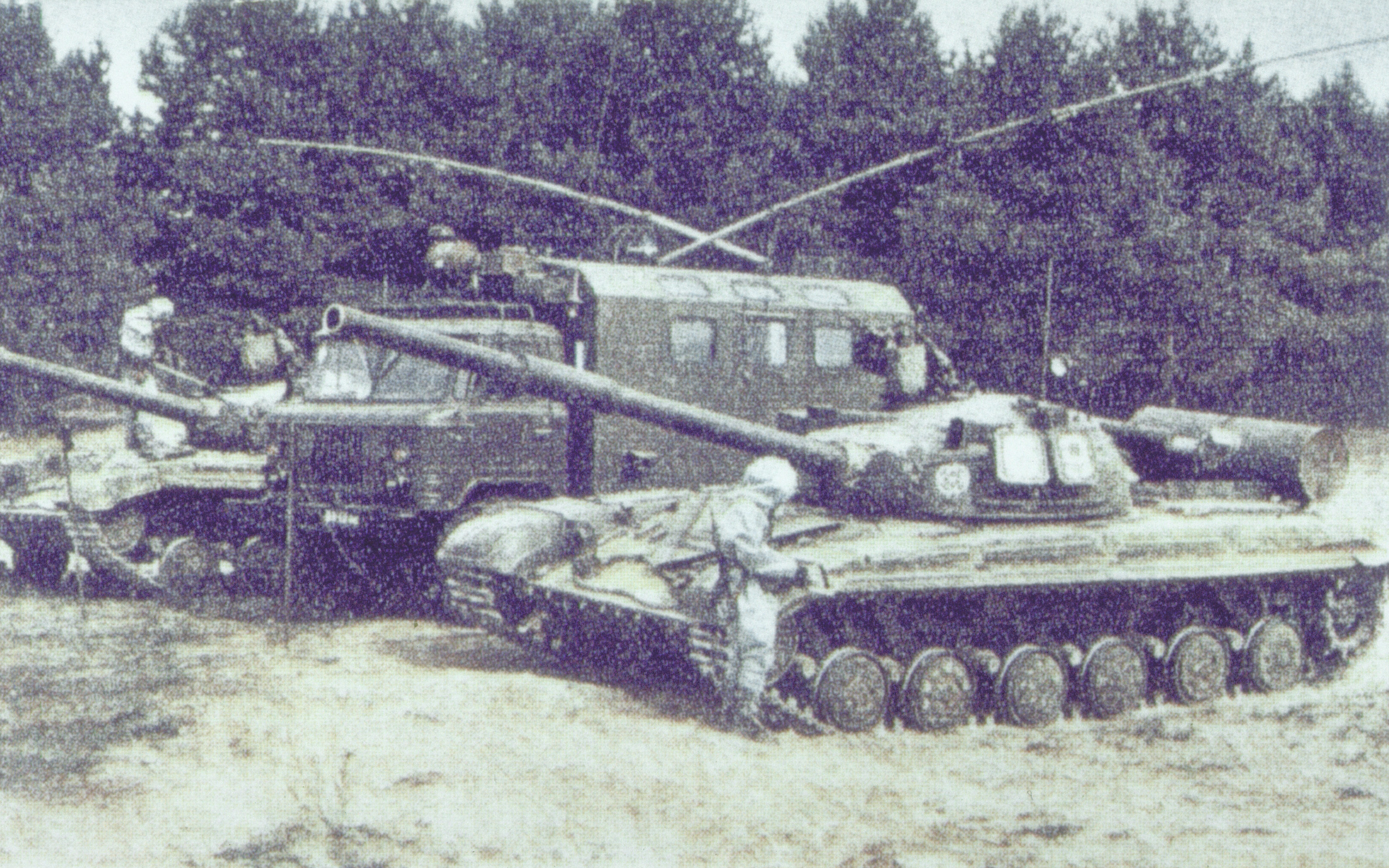
Soviet Army troops conduct a decontamination exercise, with CBRN defense measures including hazmat suits, 1987.

The Soviet chemical and biological weapons program began in earnest in August 1925, with the official establishment of a centralized agency in the form of the Red Army's Military-Chemical Directorate (Military Chemical Agency, Voenno-khimicheskoe upravlenie, abbreviated to VOKhIMU) under Yakov Moiseevich Fishman, which also oversaw the Tomka gas test site in joint cooperation with Weimar era Germany.

Russia declared an arsenal of 39,967 metric tons of chemical agents, including the nerve agents sarin, soman, and VR, as well as lewisite, mustard, and phosgene, when it signed the CWC in 1993. The USSR also investigated and produced Novichok agents, hydrogen cyanide, ricin. By comparison, 27,770 metric tons were declared for the United States chemical weapons program in 1997.

By the time of the Soviet Union's dissolution in 1991, its chemical weapons research institute, GosNIIOKhT, employed approximately 6,000 people. The employees worked in Novocheboksarsk and Volgograd on nerve agent production, in Dzerzinsk on blister agent production, in Shikhany on testing, and in Nukus, Uzbekistan on testing.

Novichok agents were designed to be undetectable and unprotectable by NATO equipment, safer to handle, and circumvent the Chemical Weapons Convention list of controlled precursors, classes of chemical and physical form.

David Wise, in his book Cassidy's Run, implies that the FBI program Operation Shocker may have led the Soviet Union to develop Novichok agents. The program aimed to feed false information about US chemical and biological programs to the Soviet Union, and the Novichok agents may have resulted from false US research on a "GJ" codenamed agent.

== Biological weapons ==
The Soviet Union covertly operated the world's largest and most sophisticated known biological weapons program. The Soviet program began in the 1920s and lasted until at least September 1992 but has possibly been continued by the Russian Federation after that. Under a civilian cover organization named Biopreparat, 40 to 50 military-purposed biological research facilities existed throughout the Soviet Union. An anti-agriculture program, Ekologiya, also targeted crops and livestock.

Soviet military doctrine use-cases for biological weapons included strategic, operational, and anti-agriculture. Strategic agents targeted cities with lethal and contagious human pathogens. The causative agents of plague, smallpox, and Q fever were weaponized and stockpiled. Strategic attacks were estimated to kill half the population of a city of millions such as New York City, and complemented Soviet strategic nuclear weapons. It remains unclear if the program operationalized delivery vehicles such as ballistic or cruise missiles.

Operational agents were more incapacitating, for targeting military reinforcements and services in the rear of the battlefield. The pathogens for glanders, tularemia, Venezuelan equine encephalitis, and brucellosis may have been considered for air-delivery by cluster munitions or spray tank. Toxins including botulinum, and enterotoxin type B, which cause botulism and food poisoning respectively, were also investigated as operational weapons until the mid-1970s.

== See also ==
- United States and weapons of mass destruction
- China and weapons of mass destruction
