= Russia and weapons of mass destruction =

Russian Federation; (originally the Soviet Union)
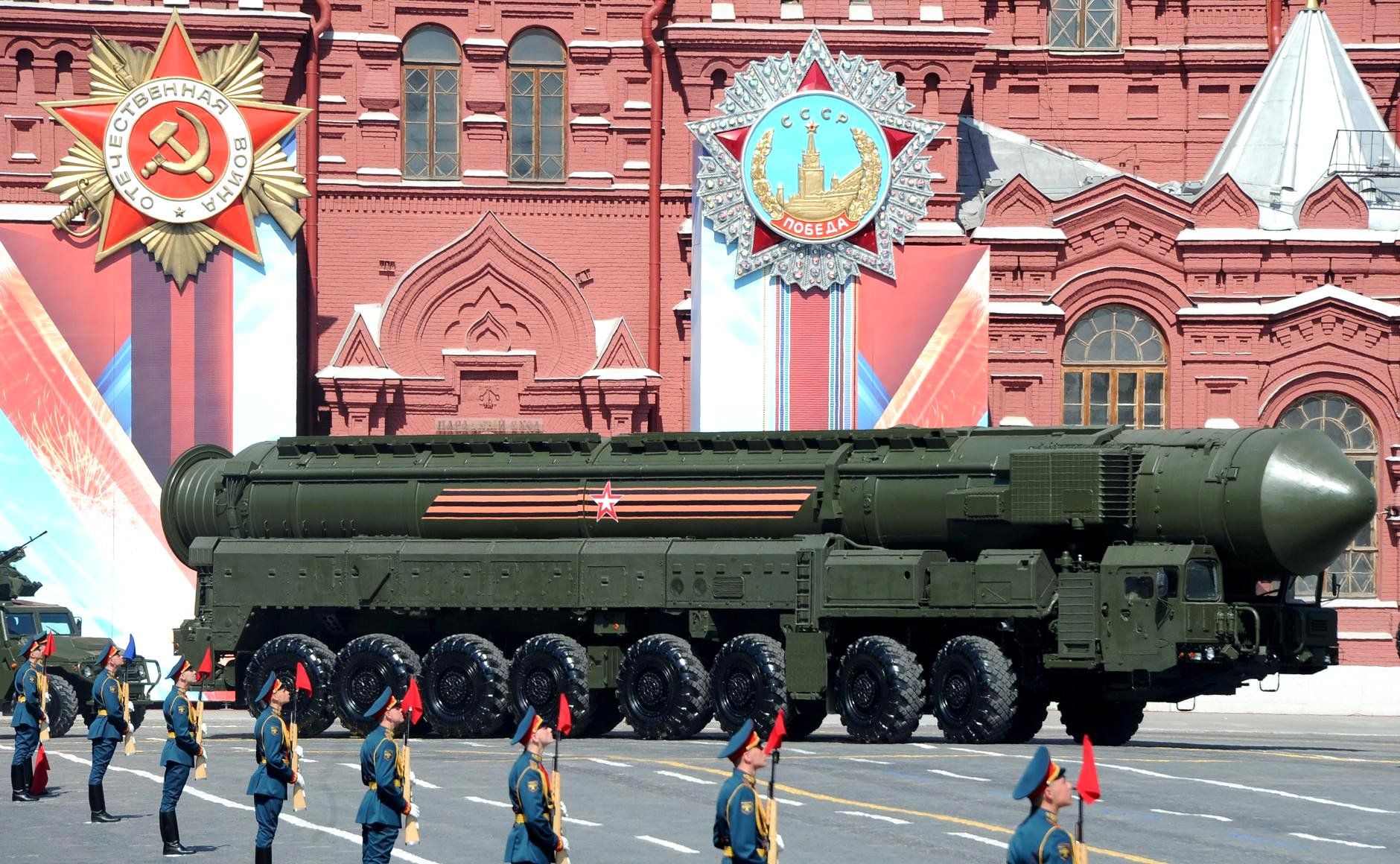
- A Topol-M intercontinental ballistic missile on display in Red Square, Moscow.

- Nuclear program start date: 1942 (as the Soviet Union)
- First nuclear weapon test: August 29, 1949 (RDS-1)
- First thermonuclear weapon test: November 22, 1955 (RDS-37)
- Last nuclear test: October 24, 1990
- Largest yield test: 50 Mt (210 PJ): Atmospheric – 50 Mt (30 October 1961); Underground – 4 Mt (October 27, 1973)
- Total tests: 715 detonations (as the Soviet Union)
- Peak stockpile: 45,000 warheads (1986)
- Current stockpile: ~4,400 (2026)
- Deployed warheads: 1,794 (2026 estimate)
- Maximum missile range: ICBM: 18,000 km (11,185 mi); SLBM: 10,000 km (6,214 mi)
- Nuclear triad: Yes
- Strategic forces: Strategic Rocket Forces; Intercontinental ballistic missiles; Navy; Delfin and Borei-class submarines; Ballistic missiles; Aerospace Forces; Tupolev Tu-95 and Tu-160; Kh-55 and Kh-38 cruise missiles
- Tactical forces: Ground Forces; 9K720 Iskander; Novator 9M729; Navy; Aerospace Forces; nuclear-capable aircraft
- NPT party: Yes (1968, one of five recognized nuclear-weapon states)
- Related institutions: Rosatom

The Russian Federation possesses the world's largest arsenal of nuclear weapons, consisting of 5,420 nuclear warheads, of which 1,794 have been deployed. It also inherited the expansive Soviet biological and chemical weapons programs, and is suspected to have continued them. It is one of the five nuclear-weapon states recognized under the Treaty on the Non-Proliferation of Nuclear Weapons and one of the five countries wielding a nuclear triad. It inherited its weapons and treaty obligations from the Soviet Union. Russia has been alleged to violate the Biological Weapons Convention and Chemical Weapons Convention.

As of 2025, Russia's triad of strategic nuclear weapons, at approximately 2,832 weapons, comprises 1,254 (Note: Only 878 are estimated to be deployed on intercontinental ballistic missiles at any one time.) warheads on its Strategic Rocket Forces' 333 intercontinental ballistic missiles, 992 (Note: Only 256 are estimated to be deployed on operational submarines (not undergoing overhaul) at any one time.) warheads on its Navy's 192 RSM-56 Bulava and R-29RMU Sineva/Lajner submarine-launched ballistic missiles, on twelve Delfin and Borei-class submarines, and 586 (Note: Only 200 are estimated to be forward-deployed at the bomber bases at any one time.) cruise missiles or bombs, for delivery by Long Range Aviation's 67 Tupolev Tu-160 and Tu-95 strategic bombers. Russia also possesses the world's largest arsenal of tactical nuclear weapons, approximately 1,500, which can be delivered by land, (Note: The Iskander-M tactical ballistic missile, and Iskander-K and Novator ground-launched cruise missiles.) sea, (Note: Various Russian submarines, surface ships, and naval aviation are estimated to be capable of launching cruise missiles, surface-to-air missiles, and nuclear depth charges, and nuclear torpedoes.) and air-launched (Note: The Tu-22M bomber, and fighters such as the Su-24, Su-34, and MiG-31K.) weapons. The Russian Space Forces oversee early warning and ballistic missile defense, operating radars such as Voronezh and Don-2N, the Oko and EKS satellites, and the anti-ballistic missile A-135, S-400, and S-300 systems, all of which can themselves be tipped with nuclear warheads.

Russia's predecessor state, the Soviet Union, held the largest nuclear arsenal in history, at 45,000 nuclear warheads in 1986. Russia and the United States together hold 88% of the world's nuclear weapons. The New START treaty limited the number each state could deploy, until its expiration in February 2026. Officially, Russian nuclear weapons use requires an order from the president, co-signed by the Minister of Defence or Chief of the General Staff. Russia extends a nuclear umbrella to member states of the Collective Security Treaty Organization.

Since its 2022 invasion of Ukraine, Russia has frequently made threats characterized as nuclear blackmail. Since 2023, Russia has provided tactical nuclear weapons systems to Belarus. Ukraine destroyed several Russian nuclear-capable strategic bombers in a large drone attack in 2025. Since 2024, Russian policy has broadly allowed nuclear first use, with strategic ambiguity on thresholds, in response to attacks on Russia with weapons of mass destruction, or to conventional attacks that critically threaten its sovereignty, territorial integrity, nuclear forces, or to large air and missile attacks.

The Soviet Union carried out 715 nuclear tests, from its first test in 1949, until 1990. This included its first thermonuclear test in 1955, and the 1961 Tsar Bomba, by far the largest nuclear test ever at 50 megatons. Testing occurred at Semipalatinsk, Novaya Zemlya, and Kapustin Yar. Russia signed and ratified the Comprehensive Nuclear-Test-Ban Treaty in 1996 but withdrew ratification in 2023. Russia's nuclear complex, managed by Rosatom, inherited the world's largest stockpiles of weapons-grade plutonium and highly enriched uranium, theoretically equivalent to over 40,000 weapons; Ural Electrochemical Combine remains the world's largest uranium enrichment site, and Mayak the world's second largest reprocessing site.

Russia inherited the Soviet biological weapons and chemical weapons programs, each the world's largest, and US intelligence assesses Russia maintains offensive biological and chemical warfare programs. Biological agents were researched from the 1920s, and in contravention of the Biological Weapons Convention from 1975. At its peak, the program employed ~65,000 people. The 1979 Sverdlovsk anthrax leak revealed the existence of the program to the Western Bloc. In 1997, Russia declared an arsenal of 39,967 tons of chemical weapons, officially declared destroyed in 2017. Russia was accused of using Novichok nerve agent in the 2018 poisoning of Sergei and Yulia Skripal and 2020 poisoning of Alexei Navalny. Russian forces admitted their use of CS gas (a form of tear gas) during the Russo-Ukrainian war, in violation of the Chemical Weapons Convention. Russia was also accused of using a radiological weapon in the form of polonium-210 in the poisoning of Alexander Litvinenko in London.

== Nuclear weapons ==
=== History ===
==== Production sites ====
Three sites in the Russian SFSR and subsequently Russia produced 145 tons of weapons-grade plutonium (uncertainty ±8 tons) from 1948 to 2010, with a consistent production peak between 1967 and 1989. Following the Moscow test reactor F-1 in 1946, the Mayak site in Chelyabinsk-40 began construction. The first plutonium production reactor A-1 began operation in 1948, fuelling the RDS-1 test. The Mayak site received nine further reactors were constructed. Of these, four were used for plutonium production, the other six reactors primarily produced tritium for thermonuclear weapons. Plutonium was also produced by five reactors at the Siberian Chemical Combine in Tomsk-7, and three reactors at the Mining and Chemical Combine in Krasnoyarsk-26. The last plutonium production reactor in Russia is believed to have shut down in 2010. Mayak continues to operate two reactors for tritium and industrial radioisotope production.

Russian sites also produced 1,250 tons of highly enriched uranium (uncertainty ±120 tons) from 1949 to 2010, excluding HEU produced for naval nuclear reactors. Of this, 500 tons was downblended by the Megatons to Megawatts Program, and a further hundred tons were used in production research reactors, nuclear tests, and other downblending programs. Russia is now believed to possess 656 tons between HEU stockpiles and HEU inside weapons themselves. This began with the SU-20 electromagnetic separation plant, but the Soviet project quickly followed the Manhattan Project's gaseous diffusion scheme, constructing the D-1 plant in Sverdlovsk-44, eventually becoming the Ural Electrochemical Combine. The D-1 plant could produce 0.01 million SWU/year. The development of the gas centrifuge and waves of modernizations brought the Ural Electrochemical Combine to 11.9 million SWU/year by 1993. Further enrichment plants were built at the Siberian Chemical Combine, the Zelenogorsk Electrochemical Plant and the Angarsk Electrochemical Combine.

==== Post-Soviet era ====
Post-Soviet countries have signed a series of treaties and agreements to settle the legacy of the former Soviet Union multilaterally and bilaterally.

At the dissolution of the Soviet Union in 1991, Soviet nuclear weapons were deployed in four of the new republics: Russia, Ukraine, Belarus and Kazakhstan. In May 1992, these four states signed the Lisbon Protocol, agreeing to join the Treaty on the Non-Proliferation of Nuclear Weapons, with Russia the continuator state to the Soviet Union as a nuclear state, and the other three states joining as non-nuclear states.

Ukraine agreed to give up its weapons to Russia, in exchange for guarantees of Ukrainian territory from Russia, the United Kingdom, and the United States, known as the Budapest Memorandum on Security Assurances. China and France also made statements in support of the memorandum.

==== Russian invasion of Ukraine ====
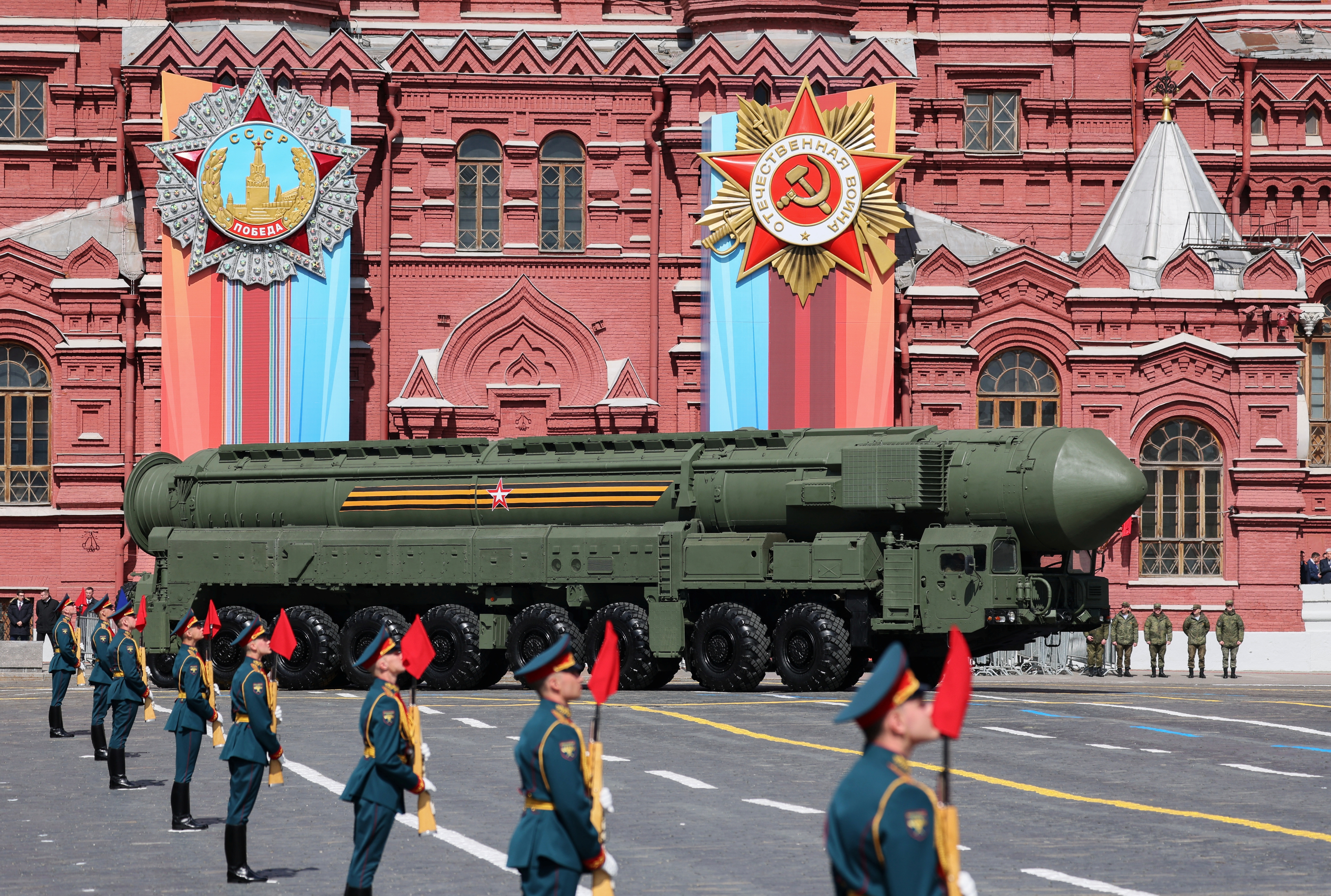
A Russian ICBM in Red Square during the Moscow Victory Day Parade, 2023.

During the Russian invasion of Ukraine that began in 2022, Russian President Vladimir Putin placed Strategic Rocket Forces's nuclear deterrence units on high alert, a move heavily condemned internationally. Putin warned that "whoever tries to hinder us in Ukraine would see consequences, you have never seen in your history". According to the former US Director of National Intelligence, Avril Haines, Putin could potentially turn to nuclear weapons if he perceived an "existential threat" to the Russian state or regime; there has been speculation that he could regard defeat in Ukraine as an existential threat to his regime.

According to a peer-reviewed study published in the journal Nature Food in August 2022, a full-scale nuclear war between the United States and Russia, which together hold more than 90% of the world's nuclear weapons, would kill 360 million people directly and more than 5 billion indirectly by starvation during a nuclear winter.

In September 2022, Putin announced the mobilization of Russian forces, and threatened nuclear retaliation against the west if Russia's territorial integrity was threatened.

On February 21, 2023, Putin suspended Russia's participation in the New START nuclear arms reduction treaty with the United States, saying that Russia would not allow the US and NATO to inspect its nuclear facilities. On March 25, 2023, Putin announced that Russia would be stationing tactical nuclear operations in Belarus. On June 14, 2023, Belarusian President Aleksander Lukashenko stated that Belarus had started to take delivery of nuclear weapons in a TV interview with Russian state channel, Russia-1.

On 25 September 2024, Putin warned the West that if attacked with conventional weapons Russia would consider a nuclear retaliation, in an apparent deviation from the no first use doctrine. Putin also warned nuclear powers that if they supported another country's attack on Russia, they would be considered participants in such aggression. Putin has made several implicit nuclear threats since the outbreak of war against Ukraine. Experts say Putin's announcement was aimed at dissuading the United States, the United Kingdom and France from allowing Ukraine to use Western-supplied long-range missiles such as the Storm Shadow and ATACMS in strikes against Russia.

=== Nuclear testing ===
==== Soviet nuclear testing ====
The Soviet Union used three major test sites: Semipalatinsk in Kazakhstan, Novaya Zemlya in the extreme north, and Kapustin Yar.

Notable tests at Semipalatinsk following RDS-1 include RDS-4, the first Soviet tactical nuclear weapon, RDS-6s, the first Soviet weapon to use thermonuclear reactions in a layer cake design, sometimes called a boosted fission weapon, and RDS-37, the first Soviet true two-stage thermonuclear weapon.

Novaya Zemlya was the site of further megaton-range explosions, including the Tsar Bomba, the largest weapon ever detonated, and the Raduga live test of an R-13 submarine-launched ballistic missile. Kapustin Yar was used for high-altitude nuclear tests launched by missiles, including the 1961 tests and Project K tests.

The Soviet Army also conducted the Totskoye nuclear exercise in Orenburg Oblast, 1954, in which 45,000 soldiers and hundreds of tanks, self-propelled guns, and armored personnel carriers were maneuvered through the blast zone of an RDS-4 nuclear bomb. After the 1963 Partial Nuclear Test Ban Treaty, underground testing continued at Semipalatinsk and Novaya Zemlya until 1990. The Soviet Union also developed "clean" thermonuclear weapons, including weapons with only deuterium as thermonuclear fuel, used in a brief program of peaceful nuclear explosions.

==== Alleged Russian nuclear testing ====
The US alleged in 2020 that Russia had carried out "nuclear weapons experiments that have created nuclear yield" between 1996 and 2019, but that it was not aware of such individual experiments in 2019. As Russia is a signatory of the Comprehensive Nuclear-Test-Ban Treaty, but the treaty is not in force, the legal status of such an experiment is unclear. The same report accused China's nuclear weapons program of constructing the infrastructure for undetectable low-yield tests, but did not allege any tests had occurred.

=== Arms reduction ===
The threat of nuclear warfare was a persistent and terrifying threat during the Cold War. At its height, the Soviet Union and United States each mustered tens of thousands of warheads, under the doctrine of mutual assured destruction. By the 1980s, both the United States and Soviet Union sought to reduce the number of weapons the other was fielding. This led to the opening of arms reduction talks in 1982.

This culminated in the signing of the START I treaty in 1991: the first nuclear arms reduction treaty between the two global powers. This first treaty limited the number of deployed warheads in each nation to 6,000, nearly halving the prior 10,000 to 12,000 being fielded in 1991. The considerable success of START I, combined with the dissolution of the Soviet Union in 1991, led to the START II treaty. Russia never ratified the treaty, and it did not go into effect. An attempted START III was attempted but could not get past negotiations.

Instead, the Strategic Offensive Reductions Treaty was passed in 2002, capping warheads at 2,200. The current limitations stem from the New START treaty, ratified in 2010. It limits each side to 1,550 weapons. Nuclear bombers only count as one weapon each, even though they may carry up to 20, so the actual limit on the countries is slightly higher. The treaty is in force through to 2026.

After U.S. President George W. Bush withdrew from the 1972 Anti-Ballistic Missile Treaty, Russia responded by building-up their nuclear capabilities, in such a way as to counterbalance U.S. capabilities. Russia decided not to sign the UN Treaty on the Prohibition of Nuclear Weapons, which was adopted on July 7, 2017, by 122 States. Most analysts agree that Russia's nuclear strategy under Putin eventually brought it into violation of the 1987 Intermediate-Range Nuclear Forces Treaty (although this is not confirmed).

According to Russian officials, the American decision to deploy the missile defense system in Europe was a violation of the treaty. U.S. President Donald Trump announced on October 20, 2018, that the U.S. would no longer consider itself bound by the treaty's provisions, raising nuclear tensions between the two powers.

On November 2, 2023, Putin signed a law that withdraws Russia's ratification of the Comprehensive Nuclear-Test-Ban Treaty.

=== Delivery systems ===
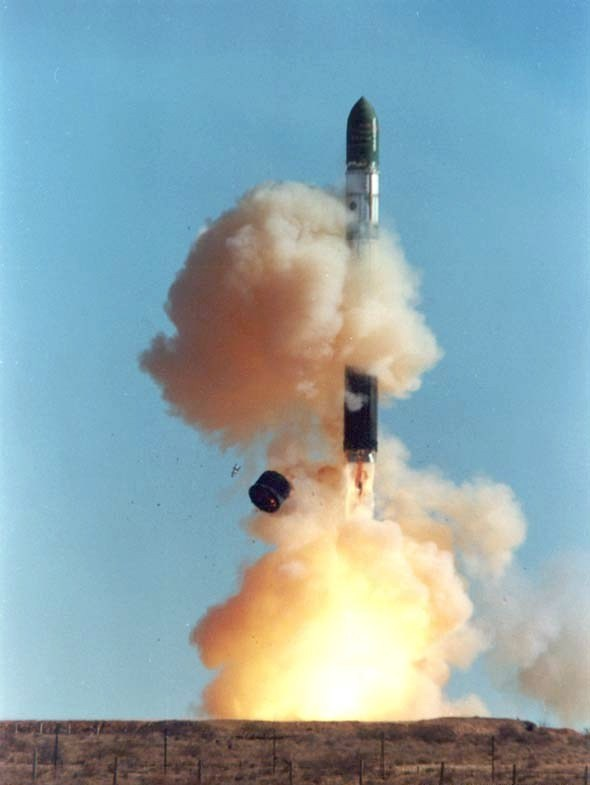
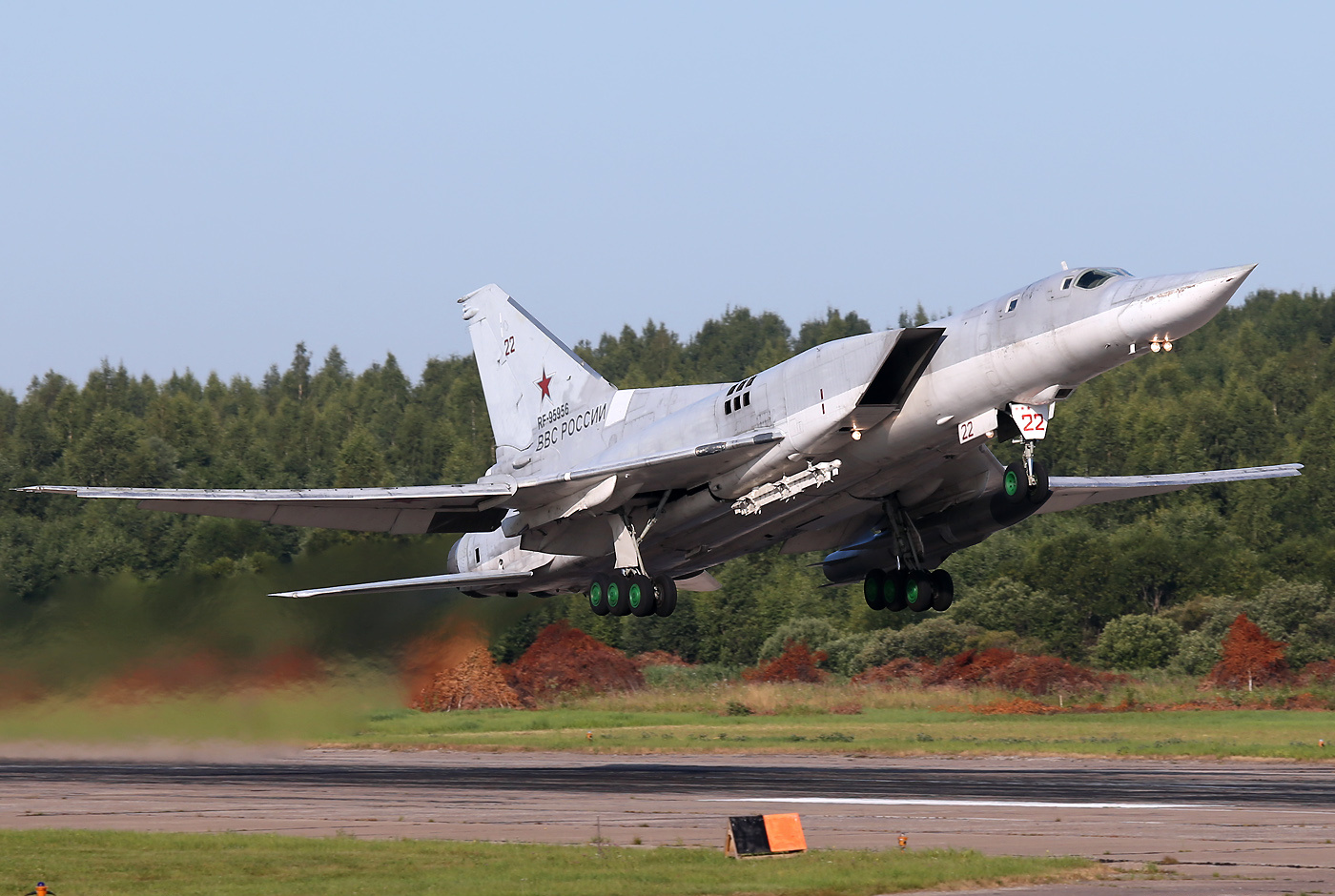
Examples of Russia's nuclear triad – a Borei-class SSBN, an R-36M2 ICBM and a Tupolev Tu-22M strategic bomber

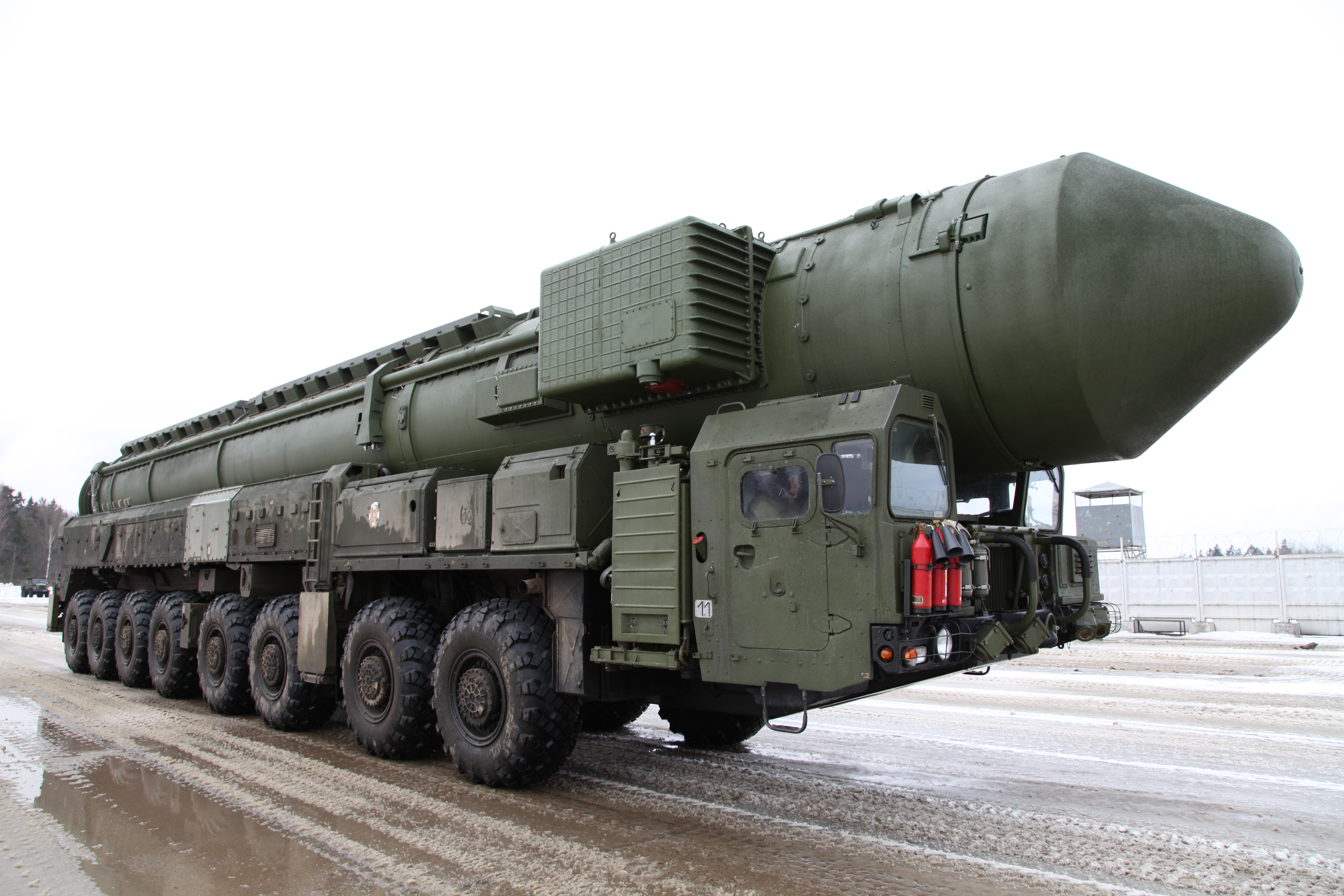
The RT-2PM2 Topol-M is one of the most recent intercontinental ballistic missiles to be deployed by Russia

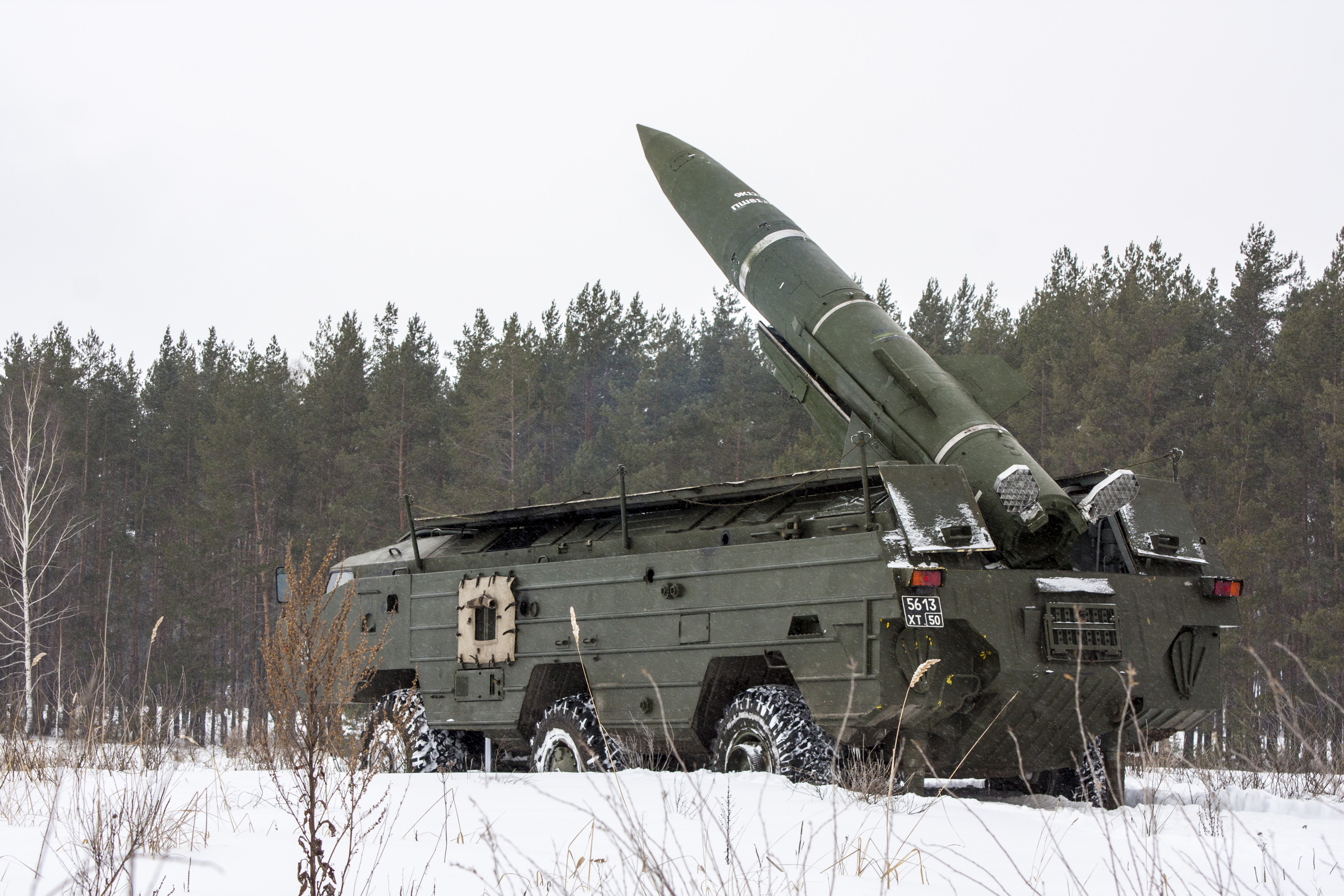
Soviet OTR-21 Tochka missile. Capable of firing a 100-kiloton nuclear warhead a distance of 185 km

The exact number of nuclear warheads is a state secret and is therefore a matter of guesswork. As of 2025, the Federation of American Scientists estimates that Russia possesses 5,459 nuclear weapons, while the United States has 5,177; Russia and the U.S. each have about 1,700 active deployed strategic nuclear warheads. Russia's stockpile is growing in size, while the United States' is shrinking. Russia has six nuclear missile fields in Kozelsk, Tatishchevo, Uzhur, Dombarovsky, Kartalay, and Aleysk; nuclear missile submarines patrolling from three naval bases at Nerpich'ya, Yagel'Naya, and Rybachiy; and nuclear bombers at Ukrainka and Engels air bases. As of 2026, Russia operates 13 nuclear-powered, nuclear-armed ballistic missile submarines, comprising five Delta-class and eight Borei-class vessels.

The RS-28 Sarmat (Russian: РС-28 Сармат; NATO reporting name: SATAN 2), is a Russian liquid-fueled, MIRV-equipped, super-heavy thermonuclear armed intercontinental ballistic missile in development by the Makeyev Rocket Design Bureau since 2009, intended to replace the previous R-36 missile. Its large payload would allow for up to 10 heavy warheads or 15 lighter ones, or a combination of warheads and massive amounts of countermeasures designed to defeat anti-missile systems. It was heralded by the Russian military as a response to the U.S. Prompt Global Strike.

In 2015, information emerged that Russia may be developing a new nuclear torpedo, the Status-6 Ocean Multipurpose System, codenamed "Kanyon" by Pentagon officials. This weapon is designed to create a tsunami wave up to 500m tall that will radioactively contaminate a wide area on an enemy coasts with cobalt-60, and to be immune to anti-missile defense systems such as laser weapons and railguns that might disable an ICBM. Two potential carrier submarines, the Project 09852 Belgorod, and the Project 09851 Khabarovsk, are new boats laid down in 2012 and 2014 respectively.

Status 6 appears to be a deterrent weapon of last resort. It appears to be a torpedo-shaped robotic mini-submarine, that can travel at speeds of 185 km/h (100 kn). More recent information suggests a top speed of 100 km/h (54 kn), with a range of 10,000 km (6,200 mi) and a depth maximum of 1,000 m (3,300 ft). This underwater drone is cloaked by stealth technology to elude acoustic tracking devices.

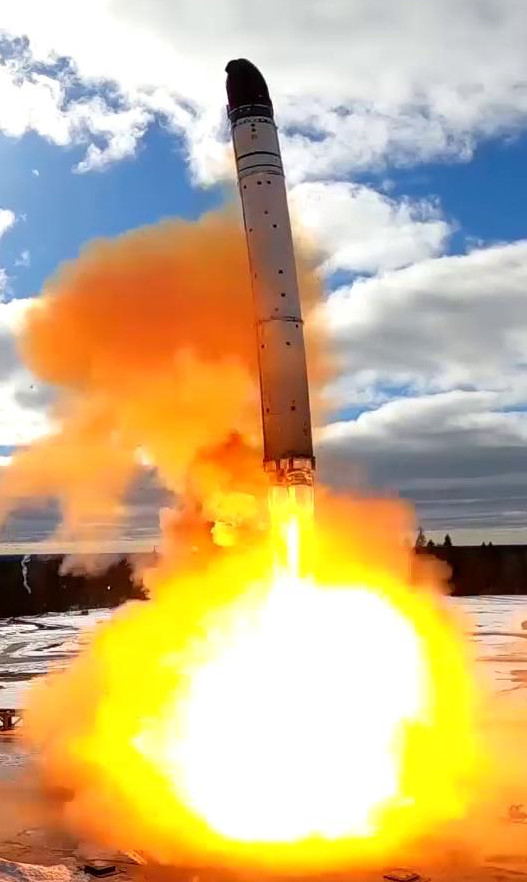
Super-heavy intercontinental ballistic missile RS-28 Sarmat

During an annual state-of-the-nation address given on March 1, 2018, President Vladimir Putin publicly claimed that Russia was now in possession of several new classes of nuclear weapons, including some with capabilities previously speculated to exist. Putin discussed several new or upgraded weapons, including a hypersonic glide vehicle known as the Avangard, capable of performing sharp maneuvers while traveling at 20 times the speed of sound making it "absolutely invulnerable for any missile defense system."

Putin discussed the existence of a nuclear powered underwater torpedo and a nuclear powered cruise missile (9M730 Burevestnik), both with effectively unlimited range. He discussed that Russia had tested a new class of traditional ICBM called the RS-28 Sarmat, which expanded upon the range and carrying capability of the Soviet-era Satan ICBM. Animations of these weapons were shown in front of the live and televised audience. Putin suggested that an online poll be conducted to give them official public names.

=== Russian nuclear weapons sharing ===
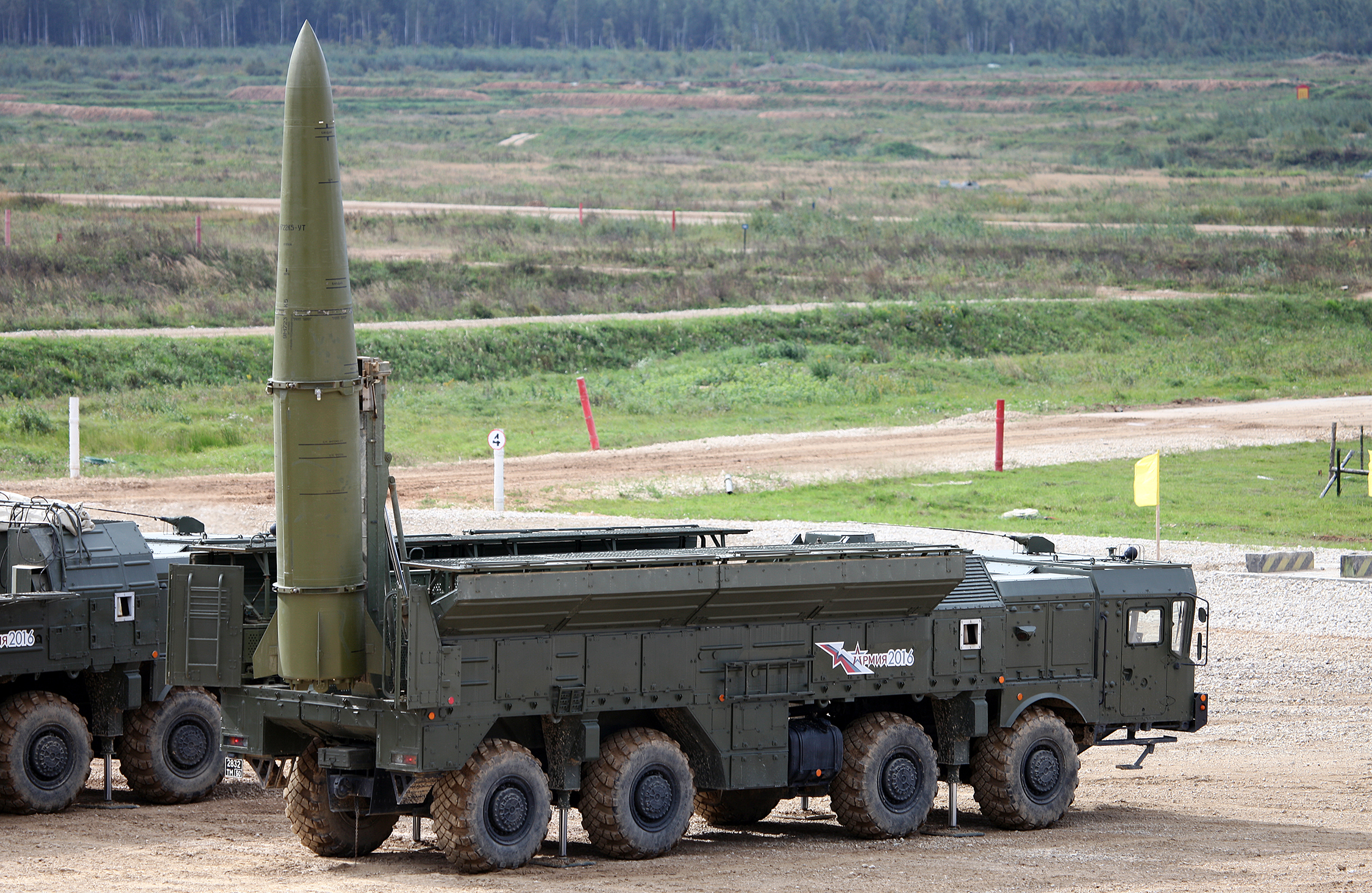
The Russian Iskander-M nuclear-capable short-range ballistic missile was deployed to Belarus in 2022.

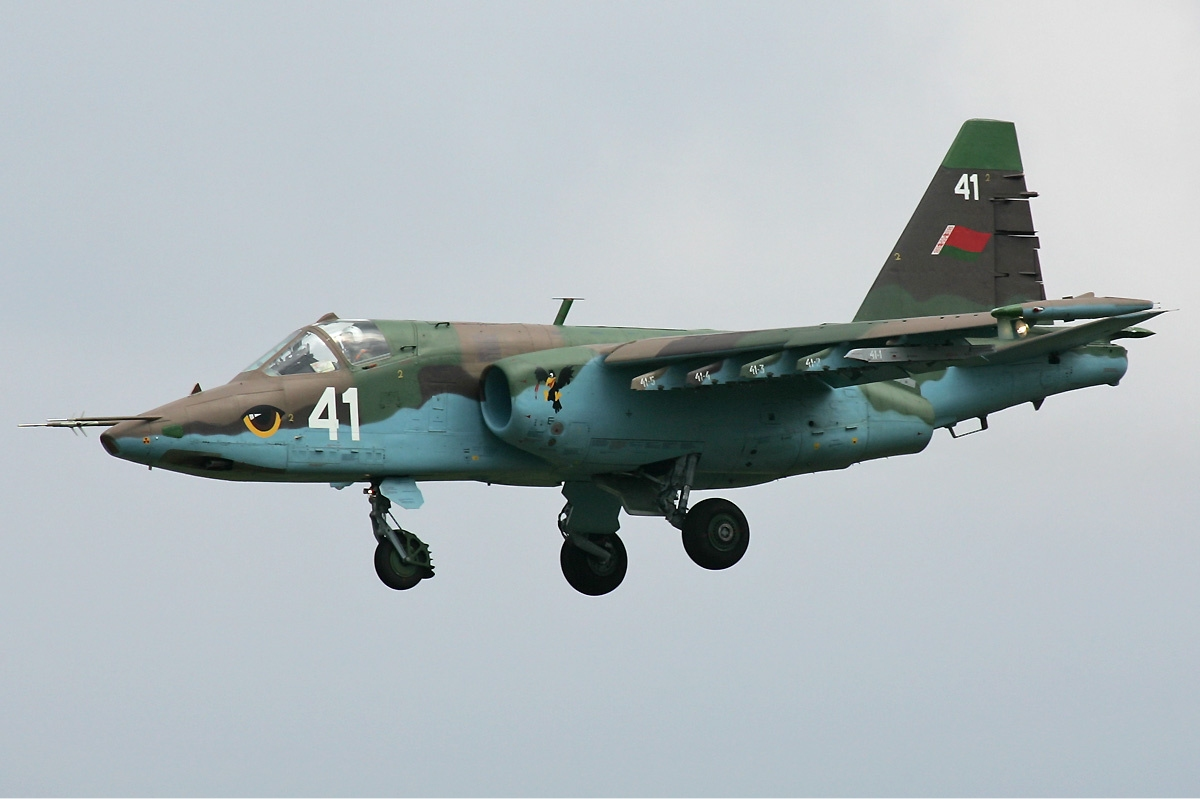
A Belarusian Air Force Sukhoi Su-25. It is believed that since 2023 some Su-25s are modified and crews trained for deploying Russian tactical nuclear weapons.

On 27 February 2022, shortly after the 2022 Russian invasion of Ukraine, Belarusians voted in a constitutional referendum with political and military reforms, including to repeal the post-Soviet constitutional prohibition on basing of nuclear weapons. The reforms also removed the country's neutral status and allowed permanent basing for the Russian Armed Forces. The referendum was criticized by the EU, UK, US, Canada, and other countries in the context of the censorship and human rights violations against the Belarusian opposition.

At a meeting on 25 June 2022, Russian President Vladimir Putin and President of Belarus Alexander Lukashenko agreed the deployment of Russian short-range nuclear-capable missiles. Lukashenko has described the weapons as "non-strategic". Russia supplied Belarus with nuclear-capable Iskander-M missile systems in 2023, with President Putin announcing the first delivery of warheads occurring as of 16 June 2023 in a speech at the St. Petersburg International Forum. These missile warheads are believed to have a variable yield between 5 and 50 kilotons. Additionally, Russia has completed modifications necessary for Belarusian Su-25 bombers to carry nuclear air-dropped bombs and the pilots have received training. The yield of these bombs is not believed to exceed 20 kilotons. Belarus has reported full operation of the nuclear-capable Iskanders and Su-25s, and exercised their use with training nuclear warheads in May 2024.

As of 2025, there is no conclusive open-source evidence that Russian nuclear warheads and gravity bombs themselves are being stored in Belarus, although the most likely location if so is a Cold War-era depot near Asipovichy. On 10 December 2024, Lukashenko stated Belarus was hosting "dozens" of Russian warheads. Putin has also stated that its Oreshnik intermediate-range ballistic missile could be deployed to Belarus in the second half of 2025, and that Belarus would play a role in nuclear targeting.

Despite Lukashenko's statement on weapon usage "without hesitation in case of aggression against Belarus", which could indicate the transfer of operational control to Belarus, Putin emphasized Russian control was maintained, and General Secretary of the CIS Sergey Lebedev described a "double nuclear button" for weapon usage.

=== Military doctrine ===
According to a Russian military doctrine stated in 2010, nuclear weapons could be used by Russia "in response to the use of nuclear and other types of weapons of mass destruction against it or its allies, and also in case of aggression against Russia with the use of conventional weapons when the very existence of the state is threatened". Most military analysts believe that, in this case, Russia would pursue an 'escalate to de-escalate' strategy, initiating limited nuclear exchange to bring adversaries to the negotiating table. Russia will also threaten nuclear conflict to discourage initial escalation of any major conventional conflict.

Leaked documents seen by the Financial Times in 2024 described a threshold for the country's use of tactical nuclear weapons that is lower than Russia had previously disclosed. The document included training scenarios for a possible invasion by China. Alexander Gabuev, director of the Carnegie Russia Eurasia Centre in Berlin told the FT: "This is the first time that we have seen documents like this reported in the public domain [...] They show that the operational threshold for using nuclear weapons is pretty low if the desired result can't be achieved through conventional means." In 2024, Russian officials said that Russia's formal doctrine would be modified to lower the threshold for nuclear use.

Russia has stated that it extends a nuclear umbrella over the Collective Security Treaty Organization member states, while its nuclear policy with Belarus includes additional provision for nuclear first use in response to conventional attacks which threatent Belarus' "very existence".

==== 2020 deterrence state policy ====
On June 2, 2020, President Putin signed an Executive Order formally titled "Fundamentals of Russia's Nuclear Deterrence State Policy", in an unprecedented public release of an official document on Russia's nuclear policy. The six-page document identified the range of threats that Russia seeks to deter with its nuclear forces, clarified Russia's general approach to nuclear deterrence, and articulated conditions under which Russia might use nuclear weapons. The policy endorses the use of nuclear weapons in response to a non-nuclear strike due to the improved capabilities of U.S. conventional weapons.

=== Nuclear proliferation ===
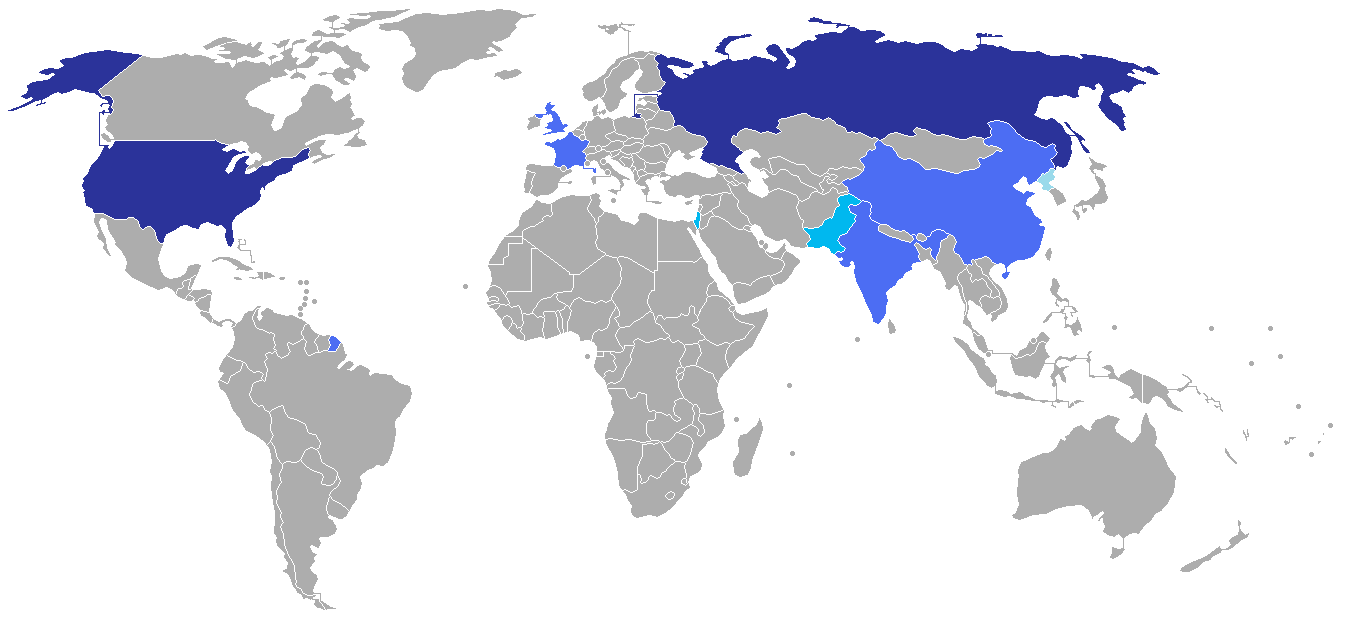
Nations with large nuclear stockpiles with global range (dark blue)

After the Korean War, the Soviet Union transferred nuclear technology and weapons to the People's Republic of China as an adversary of the United States and NATO. According to Ion Mihai Pacepa, "Khrushchev's nuclear-proliferation process started with Communist China in April 1955, when the new ruler in the Kremlin consented to supply Beijing a sample atomic bomb and to help with its mass production. Subsequently, the Soviet Union built all the essentials of China's new military nuclear industry."

Russia is one of the five "Nuclear Weapons States" (NWS) under the Treaty on the Non-Proliferation of Nuclear Weapons (NPT), which Russia ratified (as the Soviet Union) in 1968.

Following the dissolution of the Soviet Union in 1991, a number of Soviet-era nuclear warheads remained on the territories of Belarus, Ukraine, and Kazakhstan. Under the terms of the Lisbon Protocol to the NPT, and following the 1995 Trilateral Agreement between Russia, Belarus, and the US, these were transferred to Russia, leaving Russia as the sole inheritor of the Soviet nuclear arsenal. It is estimated that the Soviet Union had approximately 45,000 nuclear weapons stockpiled at the time of its collapse, according to Viktor Mikhaylov, head of the Federal Agency on Atomic Energy (Russia). The collapse of the Soviet Union allowed for a warming of relations with NATO. Fears of a nuclear holocaust lessened. In September 1997, the former secretary of the Russian Security Council Alexander Lebed claimed 100 "suitcase sized" nuclear weapons were unaccounted for. He said he was attempting to inventory the weapons when he was fired by President Boris Yeltsin in October 1996. Indeed, several US politicians have expressed worries and promised legislation addressing the threat.

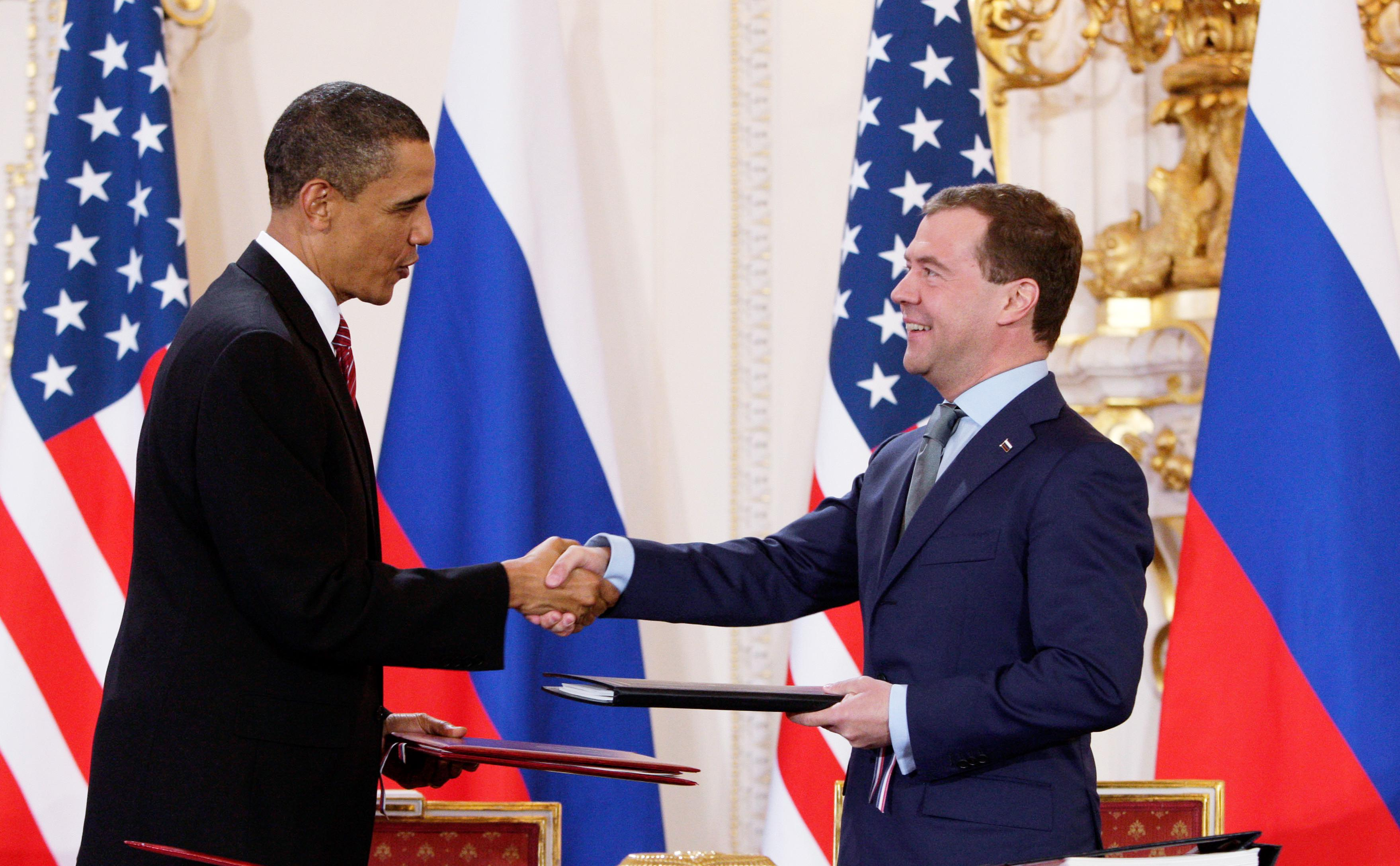
Dmitry Medvedev with Barack Obama after signing the New START treaty in Prague, 2010

There were allegations that Russia contributed to the North Korean nuclear program, selling it the equipment for the safe storage and transportation of nuclear materials. Nevertheless, Russia has condemned North Korean nuclear tests since then. The Russian Federation has also wider commercial interests in selling the nuclear technology to India and Iran, reaching understanding memorandums in training their technicians in their respected nuclear programs. Russia is allegedly making efforts to build its influential hold in Africa for earning several billions of pounds by selling nuclear technology to developing African countries.

Russia has reportedly trained its navy to target European sites with nuclear-capable missiles in a potential conflict with NATO, according to leaked documents. The plans reveal a strategy for strikes across Western Europe, emphasizing Russia's reliance on nuclear weapons due to its conventional military limitations.

=== Nuclear sabotage allegations ===
The highest-ranking GRU defector Stanislav Lunev described alleged Soviet plans for using tactical nuclear weapons for sabotage against the United States in the event of war. He described Soviet-made suitcase nukes identified as RA-115s (or RA-115-01s for submersible weapons) which weigh 50–60 pounds (23–27 kg). These portable bombs can last for many years if wired to an electric source. "In case there is a loss of power, there is a battery backup. If the battery runs low, the weapon has a transmitter that sends a coded message – either by satellite or directly to a GRU post at a Russian embassy or consulate."

Lunev was personally looking for hiding places for weapons caches in the Shenandoah Valley area. He said that "it is surprisingly easy to smuggle nuclear weapons into the US" either across the Mexican border or using a small transport missile that can slip though undetected when launched from a Russian airplane. Searches of the areas identified by Lunev – who admits he never planted any weapons in the US – have been conducted, "but law-enforcement officials have never found such weapons caches, with or without portable nuclear weapons" in the US.

In a 2004 interview, colonel general of RVSN Viktor Yesin said that Soviet small-scale nuclear bombs have only been operated by the Army. All such devices have been stored in a weapons depot within Russia, and only left it for checks at the plant which produced them.

=== Radiological weapons ===
The assassination of Alexander Litvinenko by Russian state agents with radioactive polonium was described as the beginning of an era of nuclear terrorism using radiological weapons.

=== Cultural impact ===
Following the expansion of the Russian Orthodox Church following the dissolution of the Soviet Union, an eschatalogical-political concept called Nuclear Orthodoxy gained some prominence. Nuclear Orthodoxy was further elaborated upon by Eurasianist ideologue Yegor Kholmogorov in 2009, where he argued that Russia must secure dominance over the West through military methods and nuclear blackmail. The same year, Patriarch Kirill of Moscow visited the city of Sarov, home to the All-Russian Scientific Research Institute of Experimental Physics and birthplace of Saint Seraphim of Sarov, where he said that Russia's nuclear weapons programme was the will of God.

== Biological weapons ==
The Soviet Union covertly operated the world's largest, longest, and most sophisticated biological weapons programs. The program began in the 1920s and lasted until at least September 1992 but has possibly been continued by Russia after that. Thereby, the Soviet Union violated its obligations under the Biological Weapons Convention, which it had signed on April 10, 1972, and ratified on March 26, 1975.

In the early 1970s, the Soviet Union significantly enlarged its offensive biological weapons programs. After 1975, the program of biological weapons was run primarily by the "civilian" Biopreparat agency, although it also included numerous facilities run by the Soviet Ministry of Defense, Ministry of Agriculture, Ministry of Chemical Industry, Ministry of Health, and Soviet Academy of Sciences.

According to Ken Alibek, who was deputy-director of Biopreparat, the Soviet biological weapons agency, and who defected to the United States in 1992, weapons were developed in labs in isolated areas of the Soviet Union including mobilization facilities at Omutninsk, Penza and Pokrov and research facilities at Moscow, Stirzhi and Vladimir. These weapons were tested at several facilities most often at "Rebirth Island" (Vozrozhdeniya) in the Aral Sea by firing the weapons into the air above monkeys tied to posts, the monkeys would then be monitored to determine the effects. According to Alibek, although Soviet offensive program was officially ended in 1992, Russia may be still involved in the activities prohibited by BWC.

In 1993, the story about the Sverdlovsk anthrax leak was published in Russia. The incident occurred when spores of anthrax were accidentally released from a military facility in the city of Sverdlovsk (formerly, and now again, Yekaterinburg) 1,500 km (930 mi) east of Moscow on April 2, 1979. The ensuing outbreak of the disease resulted in 94 people becoming infected, 64 of whom died over a period of six weeks.

In 2022 Russian Ministry of Defense started construction of a new massive facility at Sergiev Posad-6 site that hosted bioweapons research in Soviet times. The site belonging to 48th Central Scientific Research Institute (48 ЦНИИ) of the Russian Ministry of Defense, featuring biological security labs was even featured on Russian TV when a delegation from the ministry, then led by Sergei Shoigu visited it. Also in 2022 the 48th Institute has registered a patent for "protective medium for freeze-drying of Yersinia pestis", a common biological weapon pathogen.

As of 2024, the United States Department of State "assesses that the Russian Federation (Russia) maintains an offensive [biological weapons] program and is in violation of its obligation under Articles I and II of the BWC. The issue of compliance by Russia with the BWC has been of concern for many years."

== Chemical weapons ==
Russia signed the Chemical Weapons Convention on January 13, 1993, and ratified it on November 5, 1997. Russia declared an arsenal of 39,967 tons of chemical weapons in 1997 consisting of:

- blister agents: Lewisite, mustard, Lewisite-mustard-mix (HL)
- nerve agents: Sarin, Soman, VX

Ratification was followed by three years of inaction on chemical weapons destruction because of the August 1998 Russian financial crisis.

Russia met its treaty obligations by destroying 1% of its chemical agents by the Chemical Weapons Convention's 2002 deadline, but requested technical and financial assistance and extensions on the deadlines of 2004 and 2007 due to the environmental challenges of chemical disposal. This extension procedure spelled out in the treaty has been utilized by other countries, including the United States. The extended deadline for complete destruction (April 2012) was not met. As of October 2011, Russia had destroyed 57% of its stockpile. Russia also destroyed all of its declared Category 2 (10,616 MTs) and Category 3 chemicals.

Russia has stored its chemical weapons (or the required chemicals) which it declared within the CWC at eight locations. In Gorny (Saratov Oblast) (2.9% of the declared stockpile by mass) and Kambarka (Udmurt Republic) (15.9%) stockpiles have already been destroyed. In Shchuchye (Kurgan Oblast) (13.6%), Maradykovsky (Kirov Oblast) (17.4%) and Leonidovka, Bessonovsky District (Penza Oblast) (17.2%) destruction takes place, while installations are under construction in Pochep (Bryansk Oblast) (18.8%) and Kizner (Udmurt Republic) (14.2%).

In 1947 the 76th warehouse at Leonidovka, Penza District (ru:Леонидовка (железнодорожная станция, Пензенская область)) was reorganized into the 608th Central Aviation Ammunition Base. In 1983, the base was renamed the 50th Arsenal of the Air Force. In February 1998, the unit was reassigned to the Chief of the NBC Protection Troops and received the name 50th Arsenal for Storage of Chemical Weapons of the 1st Category. In 2001, Military Unit 21222 became part of the Federal Directorate for the Safe Storage and Destruction of Chemical Weapons and was named the Leonidovka Chemical Weapons Storage Facility. The depot was storing aviation chemical munitions filled with nerve agents such as sarin, Soman, and VX. The toxic agents stored there amounted to 17.2% of the total stockpiles in the Russian Federation. The last Russian chemical disposal facility in Kizner, Udmurtia, was opened in December 2013.

On September 27, 2017, OPCW announced that Russia had destroyed its entire declared chemical weapons stockpile, even though they continued using Novichok agents. Ukraine claims Russia used chemical weapons in Mariupol.

=== Novichok agents ===
A range of Novichok agents were developed and tested in the 1970s and 1980s, but the intended Novichok weapons production site at the Pavlodar Chemical Plant in Soviet Kazakhstan was still under construction when it was decided to demolish the chemical weapons building in 1987 in view of the forthcoming Chemical Weapons Convention.

In March 2018, former GRU agent Sergei Skripal and his daughter were poisoned in Salisbury, United Kingdom by a chemical agent later confirmed to be Novichok. The incident raised new controversy over Russia's potential production and use of chemical weapons, with the United Kingdom accusing the Russian government or rogue Russian agents of orchestrating the attack, a claim Russia repeatedly denied.

In August 2020, Russian opposition figure and anti-corruption activist Alexei Navalny was poisoned in Tomsk, Russia by a chemical agent later confirmed to be Novichok. A joint investigation by Bellingcat, CNN, Der Spiegel, and The Insider with contributions from El País implicates Russia's Federal Security Service (FSB) in the near-fatal nerve-agent poisoning, a fact denied by Russia. Navalny later called what appears to be one of the FSB agents responsible for the cleanup operation who indicates they were tasked to clean Navalny's underpants of Novichok.

Another Russia chemical weapon is Kolokol-1, an aerosolized opioid incapacitating agent thought to be carfentanil.

=== Use during the invasion of Ukraine ===
In the Russian invasion of Ukraine, Russian forces reportedly used chemical weapons 465 times between February 24, 2022, and December 2023, usually as tear gas grenades. In May 2023, a television report on Russia's Channel One showed a Russian battalion commander talking about the effectiveness of chemicals used as weapons. The report also showed a drone dropping a tear gas grenade on a dugout. In December 2023, the Russian 810th Guards Naval Infantry Brigade wrote about its use of drones to drop K-51 grenades containing CS tear gas on Ukrainian positions. The use of tear gas is banned by international Chemical Weapons Convention and considered a chemical weapon if applied by military forces during warfare. The United States accused Russia of also using Chloropicrin as a chemical weapon in Ukraine. On 17 June 2025 Ukrainian Battalion K-2 destroyed a Russian BM-21 "Grad" launcher and then intercepted Russian radio traffic in which the soldiers warned units in their vicinity to protect themselves as the rockets were "loaded with chemistry".

== See also ==
- 2022 Russian invasion of Ukraine
- Defense industry of Russia
- Father of All Bombs
- List of Russian weaponry makers
- Military doctrine of Russia
- New physical principles weapons
- Nunn–Lugar Cooperative Threat Reduction
- Soviet atomic bomb project
- Soviet biological weapons program
