= Belarus and weapons of mass destruction =

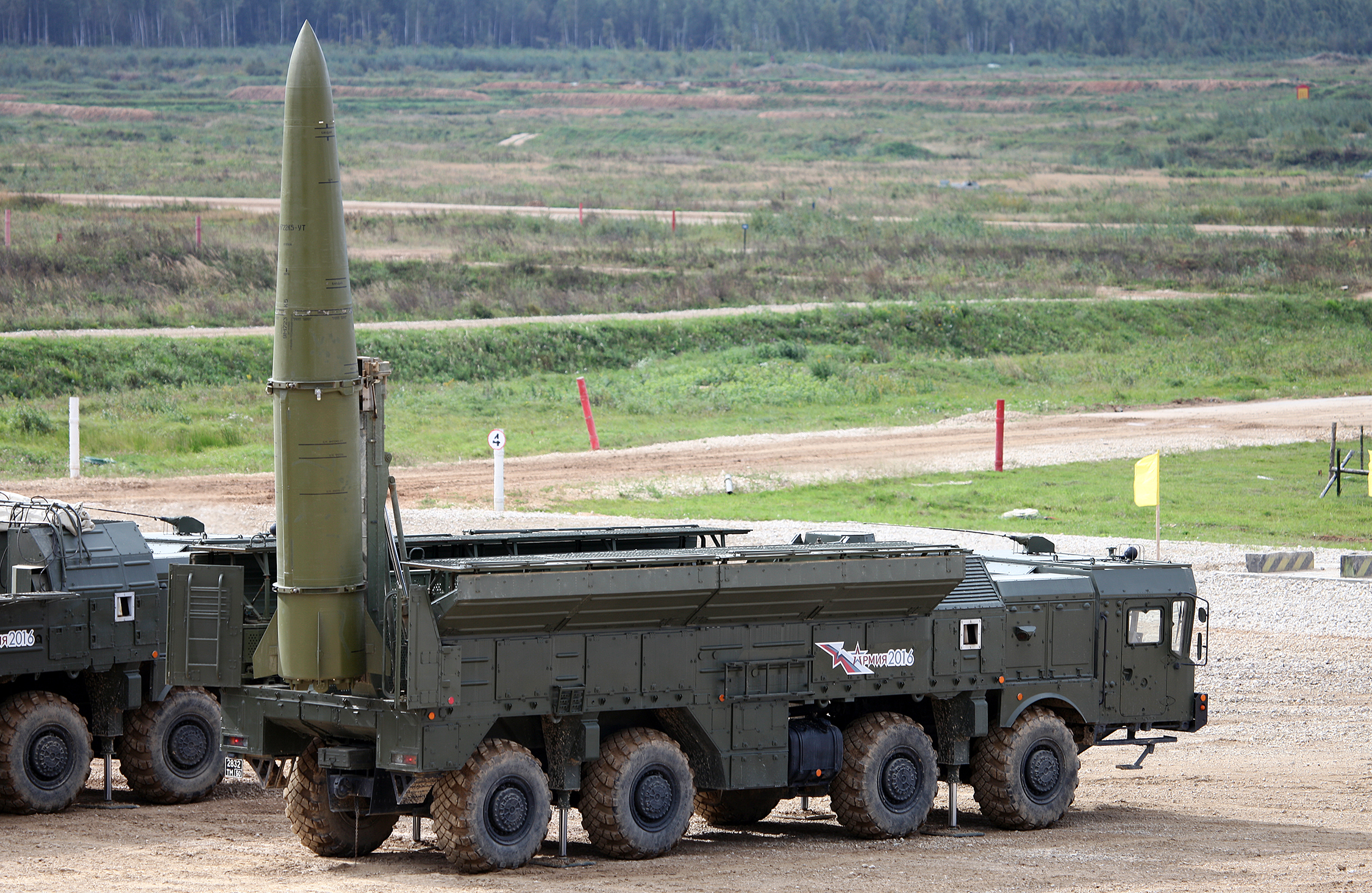
The Russian Iskander-M nuclear-capable short-range ballistic missile was deployed to Belarus in 2022.

Since 2023, Russia has claimed to have stationed nuclear weapons in Belarus. As of 2025, there is no conclusive open-source evidence that Russian nuclear warheads and gravity bombs themselves are being stored in Belarus. If they are, the most likely location is a Cold War-era depot near Asipovichy. Russia has also provided nuclear delivery systems and training to Belarusian forces in the form of Iskander-M short-range ballistic missiles and modification and training for Sukhoi Su-25 aircraft and crews to employ nuclear gravity bombs.

Belarus joined the Treaty on the Non-Proliferation of Nuclear Weapons as a non-nuclear-weapons-state in 1994.

== Nuclear weapons ==
=== Soviet period ===
The Soviet Union developed nuclear weapons in 1949. According to American think tanks, Belarus' main nuclear weapons sites at the end of the Cold War were two RT-2PM Topol bases in Lida and Mazyr.

=== Post-Soviet period ===
In the aftermath of the dissolution of the Soviet Union, the safety of nuclear weapons and related technology in the post-Soviet states became an international concern, including for the United States. In 1992, together with Kazakhstan and Ukraine, Belarus signed the Lisbon Protocol, binding them to the 1991 US-Soviet START arms control agreement, as well as accession to the Treaty on the Non-Proliferation of Nuclear Weapons. It acceded in 1993. Belarus was the first post-Soviet state to voluntarily renounce maintaining its ex-Soviet nuclear arsenal without any preconditions or reservations. The 1994 Budapest Memorandum gave Belarus, Ukraine and Kazakhstan security guarantees in exchange for their denuclearization. The withdrawal of nuclear weapons from the territory of the country was fully completed in November 1996, assisted by the US Nunn–Lugar Cooperative Threat Reduction.

=== Russian nuclear weapons sharing ===
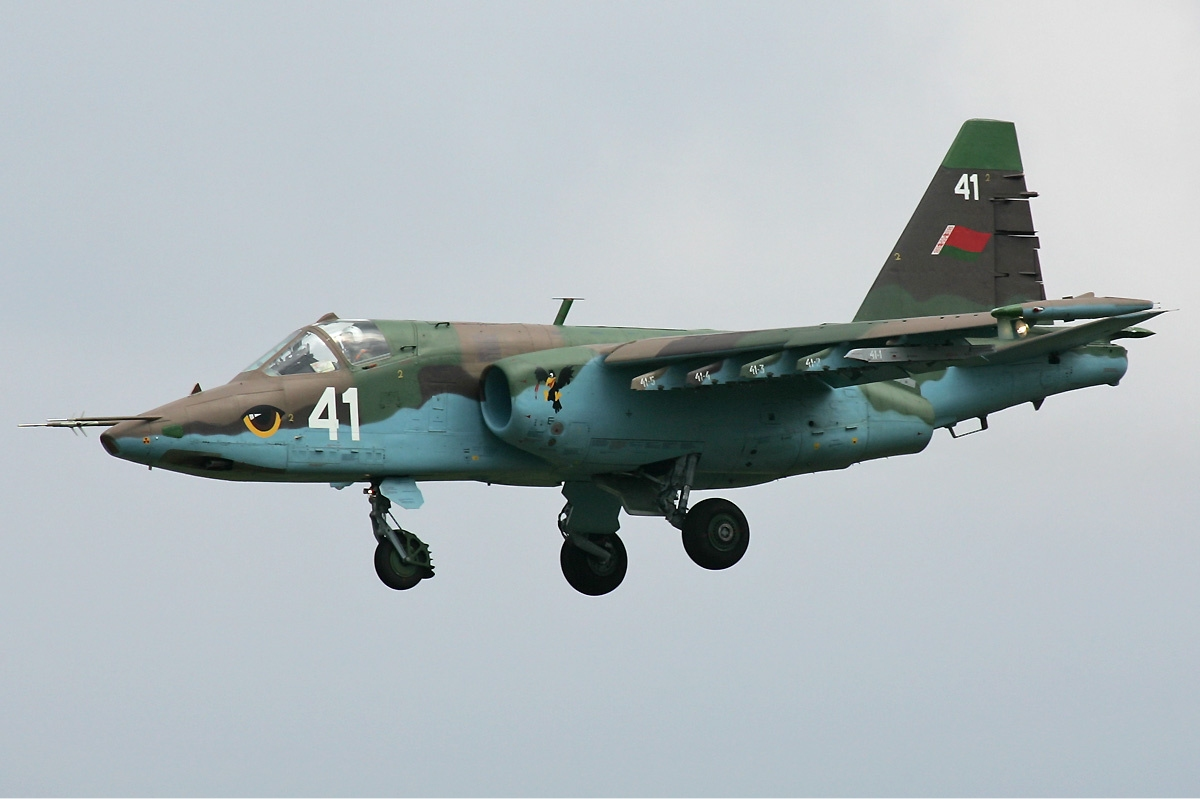
A Belarusian Air Force Sukhoi Su-25. It is believed that since 2023 some Su-25s are modified and crews trained for deploying Russian tactical nuclear weapons.

==== Technical details ====
At a meeting on 25 June 2022, Russian President Vladimir Putin and President of Belarus Alexander Lukashenko agreed the deployment of Russian short-range nuclear-capable missiles. Lukashenko has described the weapons as "non-strategic". Russia supplied Belarus with nuclear-capable Iskander-M missile systems in 2023, with President Putin announcing the first delivery of warheads occurring as of 16 June 2023 in a speech at the St. Petersburg International Forum. These missile warheads are believed to have a variable yield between 5 and 50 kilotons. Additionally, Russia has completed modifications necessary for Belarusian Su-25 bombers to carry nuclear air-dropped bombs and the pilots have received training. The yield of these bombs is not believed to exceed 20 kilotons. Belarus has reported full operation of the nuclear-capable Iskanders and Su-25s, and exercised their use with training nuclear warheads in May 2024.

As of 2025, there is no conclusive open-source evidence that Russian nuclear warheads and gravity bombs themselves are being stored in Belarus, although the most likely location if so is a Cold War-era depot near Asipovichy. On 10 December 2024, Lukashenko stated Belarus was hosting "dozens" of Russian warheads. Putin has also stated that its Oreshnik intermediate-range ballistic missile could be deployed to Belarus in the second half of 2025, and that Belarus would play a role in nuclear targeting.

Despite Lukashenko's statement on weapon usage "without hesitation in case of aggression against Belarus", which could indicate the transfer of operational control to Belarus, Putin emphasized Russian control was maintained, and General Secretary of the CIS Sergey Lebedev described a "double nuclear button" for weapon usage.

==== Political events ====
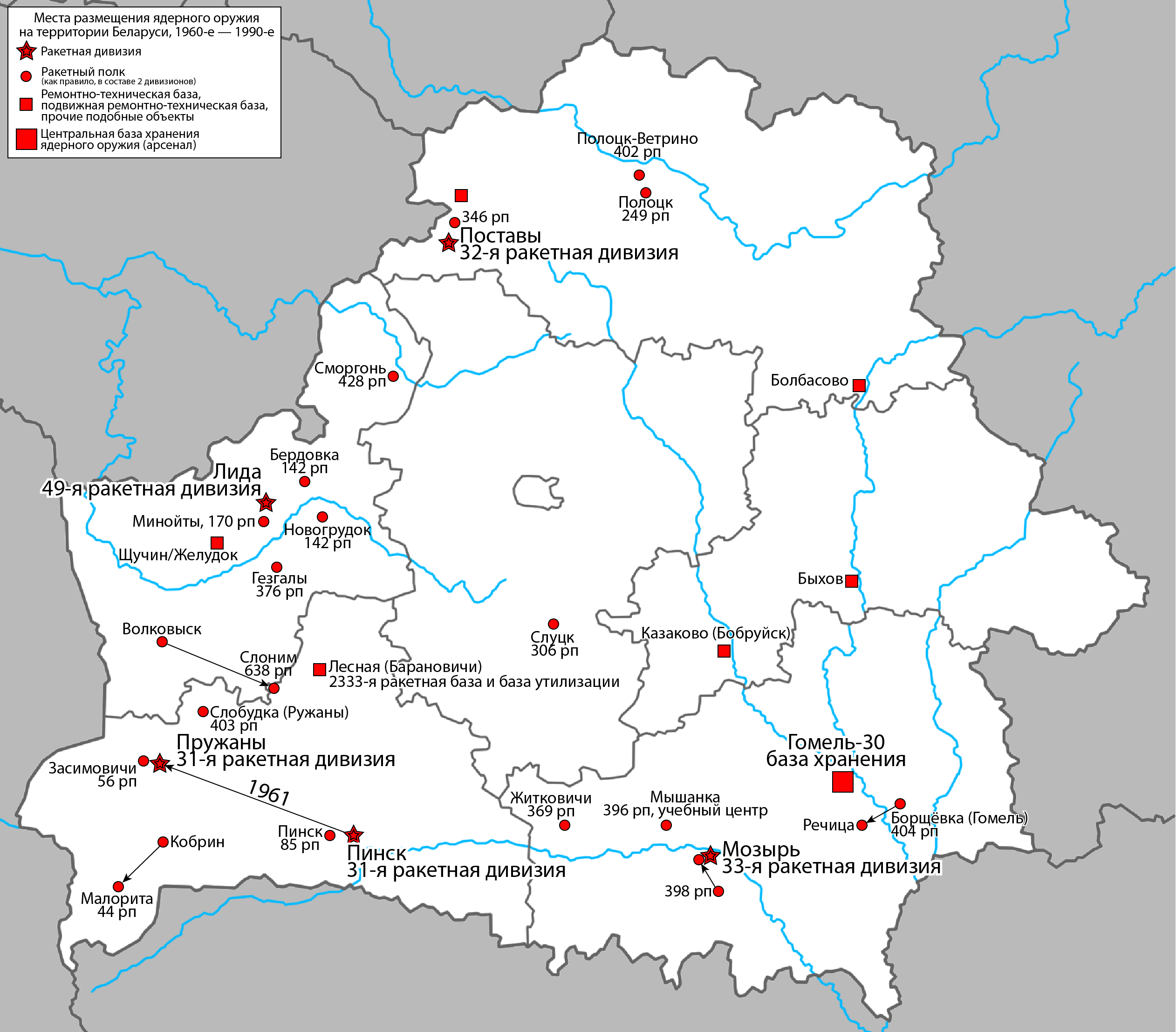
The Russian data indicating the Russian nuclear weapons being stationed in Belarus.

On 27 February 2022, shortly after the 2022 Russian invasion of Ukraine, Belarusians voted in a constitutional referendum with political and military reforms, including to repeal the post-Soviet constitutional prohibition on basing of nuclear weapons. The reforms also removed the country's neutral status and allowed permanent basing for the Russian Armed Forces. The referendum was criticized by the EU, UK, US, Canada, and other countries in the context of the censorship and human rights violations against the Belarusian opposition.

Russia's stationing of nuclear weapons has been condemned by Belarusian opposition leader Sviatlana Tsikhanouskaya, who stated that the deployment "grossly contradicts the will of the Belarusian people," and Ukrainian president Volodymyr Zelenskyy, who referred to it as a "step towards internal destabilisation". The Atlantic Council think tank has described the stationing of tactical nuclear weapons in Belarus as demonstrating the status of Belarus as a puppet state.

Among the independent commentators on the stationing of Russian nuclear weapons in Belarus is Belarusian chemist and science journalist Siarhei Besarab. Following the announcement of plans to deploy tactical nuclear weapons, Besarab published analytical materials discussing potential storage sites and the associated risks, contributing to the public discussion about nuclear and environmental safety in Belarus. His activities in this area became one of the reasons for increased pressure from the authorities, leading to his forced emigration in 2023.

== Chemical weapons ==
Belarus signed the Chemical Weapons Convention in 1993 and ratified it in 1996. It was a member republic of the Soviet Union during the Soviet chemical weapons program.

== Biological weapons ==
Belarus was a member republic of the Soviet Union when that state signed the Biological Weapons Convention in 1972 and ratified it in 1975. Despite this, the Soviet biological weapons program spanned almost the entire duration of the Soviet Union's existence, including into the 1990s. The open institution of the Byelorussian Research Institute of Epidemiology and Microbiology, located in Minsk, allowed the import of hemorrhagic fever viruses for the program in the early 1980s. Via its relationship with the Institute of Tropical Medicine Antwerp, it obtained the Mayinga variant of Ebola virus and the Voege variant of Marburg virus. Arms control scholar Milton Leitenberg assumes these viruses were transferred to Moscow's Zagorsk Institute for weaponization.
