= SU-20 =

1950s Soviet isotope separation facility

The multi-floored separation facility within the Elektrokhimpribor plant

SU-20 is an electromagnetic isotope separation facility Elektrokhimpribor Combine, in Lesnoy, Sverdlovsk Oblast, Russia. It was operated from 1950 as part of the Soviet atomic bomb project.

Its original purpose further enrich 75% highly enriched uranium from the D-1 diffusion plant at Mayak to a weapons-suitable 90%. It did this by separating uranium-235-tetrachloride from its uranium-238 counterpart via the slight mass and thus trajectory difference during ion acceleration. This role was similar to the calutrons used at the Y-12 complex of the Manhattan Project. Its design team was led by physicist Lev Artsimovich. This highly enriched uranium was used in the first Soviet test of a uranium weapon (RDS-3), its third test in October 1951.

It exhibited poor performance, and in mid-1951 it was decided to reconstruct and repurpose it for light isotope separation. It provided the lithium-6 required for the first two Soviet thermonuclear tests, RDS-6s in 1953 and presumably RDS-27 in 1955. Following 1955, it was used for stable isotope separation, including strontium-88, thallium-203, and ytterbium-168.

== See also ==
- Sverdlovsk-45
- Soviet atomic bomb project
- Lev Artsimovich
