= Lisbon Protocol =

Arms agreement of former USSR states

The Lisbon Protocol to the 1991 Strategic Arms Reduction Treaty
- Signed: 23 May 1992
- Location: Lisbon, Portugal
- Effective: 5 December 1994
- Signatories: Belarus; Kazakhstan; Russia; Ukraine; United States

The Lisbon Protocol to the 1991 Strategic Arms Reduction Treaty was a document signed by representatives of Belarus, Kazakhstan, Russia, and Ukraine that recognized the four states as successors of the Soviet Union and all of them assume obligations of the Soviet Union under the START I treaty.

These were the four countries in which strategic nuclear weapons of the former Soviet Union remained. The protocol also committed Belarus, Kazakhstan, and Ukraine to join the Treaty on the Non-Proliferation of Nuclear Weapons as non-nuclear-weapon states, which was completed by 1994. The 1994 Budapest Memorandum implemented the removal of nuclear weapons from Belarus, Kazakhstan, and Ukraine by 1996, in exchange for security guarantees.

The protocol was signed in Lisbon, Portugal, on 23 May 1992.

== Background ==
When the Soviet Union dissolved on 26 December 1991, the Russian representative had already assumed the former Soviet seat in the UN headquarters on 25 December 1991. One of the issues was the fate of its nuclear weapons. Most were in the territory of Russia, but thousands of warheads were in the territories of Belarus, Kazakhstan, and Ukraine. In July 1991, the Soviet Union had signed the START I nuclear disarmament treaty.

The signing of Protocol was taken place during the ongoing process of reorganization of former Soviet Union into Commonwealth of Independent States (CIS) and creation of Joint Armed Forces of the CIS following the signing of Alma-Ata Declaration in late 1991.

=== Article I ===
The Republic of Belarus, the Republic of Kazakhstan, the Russian Federation, and Ukraine, as successor states of the former Union of Soviet Socialist Republics in connection with the Treaty, shall assume the obligations of the former Union of Soviet Socialist Republics under the Treaty.

=== Article II ===
The Republic of Belarus, the Republic of Kazakhstan, the Russian Federation, and Ukraine shall make such arrangements among themselves as are required to implement the Treaty's limits and restrictions; to allow functioning of the verification provisions of the Treaty equally and consistently throughout the territory of the Republic of Belarus, the Republic of Kazakhstan, the Russian Federation, and Ukraine; and to allocate costs.

=== Article III ===
1. For purposes of Treaty implementation, the phrase, "Union of Soviet Socialist Republics" shall be interpreted to mean the Republic of Belarus, the Republic of Kazakhstan, the Russian Federation, and Ukraine.
2. For purposes of Treaty implementation, the phrase, "national territory," when used in the Treaty to refer to the Union of Soviet Socialist Republics, shall be interpreted to mean the combined national territories of the Republic of Belarus, the Republic of Kazakhstan, the Russian Federation, and Ukraine.
3. For inspections and continuous monitoring activities on the territory of the Republic of Belarus, the Republic of Kazakhstan, the Russian Federation, or Ukraine, that state shall provide communications from the inspection site or continuous monitoring site to the Embassy of the United States in the respective capital.
4. For purposes of Treaty implementation, the embassy of the Inspecting Party referred to in Section XVI of the Protocol on Inspections and Continuous Monitoring Activities Relating to the Treaty between the United States of America and the Union of Soviet Socialist Republics on the Reduction and Limitation of Strategic Offensive Arms shall be construed to be the embassy of the respective state in Washington or the embassy of the United States of America in the respective capital.
5. The working languages for Treaty activities shall be English and Russian.

=== Article IV ===
Representatives of the Republic of Belarus, the Republic of Kazakhstan, the Russian Federation, and Ukraine will participate in the Joint Compliance and Inspection Commission on a basis to be worked out consistent with Article I of this Protocol.

=== Article V ===
The Republic of Belarus, the Republic of Kazakhstan, and Ukraine shall adhere to the Treaty on the Non-Proliferation of Nuclear Weapons of 1 July 1968 as non-nuclear weapon states Parties in the shortest possible time, and shall begin immediately to take all necessary action to this end in accordance with their constitutional practices.

=== Article VI ===
1. Each Party shall ratify the Treaty together with this Protocol in accordance with its own constitutional procedures. The Republic of Belarus, the Republic of Kazakhstan, the Russian Federation, and Ukraine shall exchange instruments of ratification with the United States of America. The Treaty shall enter into force on the date of the final exchange of instruments of ratification.
2. This Protocol shall be an integral part of the Treaty and shall remain in force throughout the duration of the Treaty.

=== Signing of the protocol ===
Done at Lisbon on 23 May 1992, in five copies, each in the Belarusian, English, Kazakh, Russian, and Ukrainian languages, all texts being equally authentic.

- For the Republic of Belarus: P. Kravchanka
- For the Republic of Kazakhstan: T. Zhukeyev
- For the Russian Federation: A. Kozyrev
- For Ukraine: A. Zlenko
- For the United States of America: James A. Baker III

== Implementation ==
Although Belarus, Ukraine and Kazakhstan had signed the protocol in May 1992, each state had to ratify and implement both the protocol and the Treaty. In Belarus and Ukraine, there was some resistance to giving up nuclear arms. However, on 5 December 1994, all signatories to the Lisbon Protocol exchanged instruments of ratification, and the agreement came into force.

Kazakhstan's government was more interested in focusing resources on the country's development rather than on maintenance of a nuclear arsenal. In return for security guarantees, military aid, and financial assistance and compensation from the United States and Russia, Kazakhstan had surrendered all nuclear weapons to Russia by May 1995. Both Belarus and Ukraine resisted full implementation of the protocol during the 1990s, wishing to retain a nuclear deterrent force or a diplomatic bargaining chip. However, Belarus was economically dependent on Russia and eventually carried out its agreement to transfer all nuclear weapons to Russia. Like Kazakhstan, Ukraine eventually agreed to surrender its nuclear weapons in exchange for security guarantees, military aid, financial assistance, and compensation from the United States and Russia. Implementation of the Lisbon Protocol was complete when both Belarus and Ukraine had surrendered their nuclear weapons to Russia by the end of 1996.

=== Ukraine ===
During the signing of the protocol Ukraine was concerned with numerous armed conflicts that took place throughout territory of the recently dissolved Soviet Union on pretence of local inter-ethnic skirmishes such as 1991–1992 South Ossetia War, Transnistria War, and others. Also on 11 January 1992 negotiations between the Russian Federation and Ukraine about the Black Sea Fleet fell through and concurrently with it the Russian parliamentary committees initiated revision of legal grounds of the 1954 Ukase of Presidium of the Soviet Supreme Soviet about transferring of Crimea to Ukraine.

Within the Strategic Arms Reduction Treaty which was signed between United States and Soviet Union, Ukraine was recognized as one of successors of the Soviet Union. According to Article V of the Protocol, Ukraine had to make a commitment to join the Treaty on the Non-Proliferation of Nuclear Weapons as a country-participant that does not possess nuclear weapon. While there was no specific timeframe, the document stipulated to ratify the treaty in the shortest time possible. The Lisbon Protocol provided that Ukraine equally with all its parties including the United States becomes a participant of the Strategic Arms Reduction Treaty and has to ratify it. After the dissolution of the Soviet Union, 17% of the Soviet nuclear arsenal was located in Ukrainian territory.

Even before signing of the Lisbon Protocol, Ukraine made several official declarations about its intent to become a nuclear-free state among which are the Declaration of State Sovereignty of Ukraine (Article IX) as well as separate Law of Ukraine. After signing the protocol, on 1 October 1992 President Leonid Kravchuk declared at the 46th UN General Assembly Ukraine's intent to acquire the status of non-nuclear state.

On 18 November 1993 Verkhovna Rada (Ukrainian Parliament) ratified both the START treaty and the Protocol in its parliamentary statement adopted at a closed door session where also were put forth conditions under which Ukraine may join the Non-Proliferation Treaty as well as list of issues that must become a subject of further negotiations. Following negotiations between Russia, Ukraine, and the United States, on 14 January 1994 there was signed the Trilateral declaration of the presidents of Ukraine, the USA, and Russia which was a road map on implementation of the START treaty. Right before the trilateral negotiations, procedural compliance within the Strategic Arms Reduction Treaty was further prescribed in bilateral Russia–Ukraine treaties (better known as Massandra Accords).

== See also ==
- Dissolution of the Soviet Union
- Nuclear Non-Proliferation Treaty
- Strategic Arms Reduction Treaty
- Nuclear weapons and Ukraine
- Arms control
- List of weapons of mass destruction treaties
- START I
