= Soviet biological weapons program =

Soviet pathogen weaponization from 1920s to 1990s

The Soviet Union covertly operated the world's largest and most sophisticated known biological weapons program. The Soviet program began in the 1920s and lasted until at least September 1992 but has possibly been continued by the Russian Federation after that. Under a civilian cover organization named Biopreparat, 40 to 50 military-purposed biological research facilities existed throughout the Soviet Union. An anti-agriculture program, Ekologiya, also targeted crops and livestock.

Soviet military doctrine use-cases for biological weapons included strategic, operational, and anti-agriculture. Strategic agents targeted cities with lethal and contagious human pathogens. The causative agents of plague, smallpox, and Q fever were weaponized and stockpiled. Strategic attacks were estimated to kill half the population of a city of millions such as New York City, and complemented Soviet strategic nuclear weapons. It remains unclear if the program operationalized delivery vehicles such as ballistic or cruise missiles.

Operational agents were more incapacitating, for targeting military reinforcements and services in the rear of the battlefield. The pathogens for glanders, tularemia, Venezuelan equine encephalitis, and brucellosis may have been considered for air-delivery by cluster munitions or spray tank. Toxins including botulinum, and enterotoxin type B, which cause botulism and food poisoning respectively, were also investigated as operational weapons until the mid-1970s.

For serving in both strategic and operational roles, the causative agents of anthrax and Marburg virus disease were also stockpiled. Ekologiya studied anti-livestock pathogens such as for rinderpest and anthrax, and anti-crop such as rice blast and stem rust.

These programs became immense and were conducted at dozens of secret sites employing up to 65,000 people. Annualized production capacity for weaponized smallpox, for example, was 90 to 100 tons. In the 1980s and 1990s, many of these agents were genetically altered to resist heat, cold, and antibiotics.

In the 1990s, Boris Yeltsin admitted to an offensive biological weapons program as well as to the true nature of the Sverdlovsk anthrax leak of 1979, which had resulted in the deaths of at least 64 people. Defecting Soviet bioweaponeers such as Vladimir Pasechnik and Colonel Ken Alibek confirmed that the program had been massive and still existed. In 1992, a Trilateral Agreement was signed with the United States and the United Kingdom promising to end biological weapons programs and convert facilities to benevolent purposes, but compliance with the agreement—and the fate of the former Soviet bio-agents and facilities—is still mostly undocumented.

== History ==
=== Pre-World War II ===
International restrictions on biological warfare began only with the June 1925 Geneva Protocol, which prohibits the use but not the possession or development of chemical and biological weapons. Upon ratification of the Geneva Protocol, several countries made reservations regarding its applicability and use in retaliation. The Soviet Union was one, when it deposited its ratification notice. Due to these reservations, it was in practice a "no-first-use" agreement only.

The principal architect of the Soviet Union's first military biological programme was Yakov Moiseevich Fishman. In August 1925, he was appointed the first head of the Red Army's Military-Chemical Directorate (Voenno-khimicheskoe upravlenie, abbreviated to VOKhIMU). In 1926, at a small laboratory controlled by VOKhIMU, Fishman initiated research on Bacillus anthracis (the causative agent of anthrax). In February 1928, Fishman prepared a key report for Kliment Efremovich Voroshilov (the People's Commissar for Military and Navy Affairs and Chairman of the USSR's Revolutionary Military Council) on the Soviet Union's preparedness for biological warfare. It asserted that "the bacterial option could be successfully used in war" and proposed a plan for the organisation of Soviet military bacteriology. It was at this time that Ivan Mikhailovich Velikanov, an expert on botulinum toxin and botulism, emerged as the lead scientist in the early Soviet biological weapons program. In 1930, Velikanov was placed in command of a new facility, the Red Army's Vaccine-Sera Laboratory in Vlasikha, around 30 miles to the west of Moscow. Buildings at the site belonging to a smallpox institute, subordinate to the People's Commissariat of Health, were transferred to the military facility. Early programs at the military lab focused on Francisella tularensis (the causative agent of tularaemia).

Running parallel to the work underway at Vlasikha, BW research was also being pursued in an institution controlled by the state security apparatus. In July 1931, the Joint State Political Directorate (OGPU), a forerunner of the NKVD, seized control of the Intercession Convent in Suzdal and then the following year created a special prison laboratory, or sharashka, where around nineteen leading plague and tularaemia specialists were forced to work on the development of biological weapons. By 1936, scientists working on BW at both Vlasikha and Suzdal were transferred to Gorodomlya Island where they occupied an institute for the study of foot-and-mouth disease which had been built originally for the People’s Commissariat of Agriculture (Narkomzem). Velikanov was placed in command of the Gorodomlya Island facility which was named as the Biotechnical Institute, also known by the code designation V/2-1094. German intelligence reported that the institute was engaged in experiments focused on Francisella tularensis (the causative agent of tularaemia) and Yersinia pestis (the causative agent of plague).

In the summer of 1936, Ivan Mikhailovich Velikanov led the Red Army's first expedition to conduct tests of biological weapons on Vozrozhdeniya Island. Around 100 personnel from Velikanov's Biotechnical Institute participated in the experiments. In July 1937, while planning for a second expedition to the island, Velikanov was arrested by the Soviet security organs and subsequently shot. Later that same summer, Leonid Moiseevich Khatanever, the new director of the Biotechnical Institute and an expert on Francisella tularensis (the causative agent of tularaemia), led a second expedition to Vozrozhdeniya. Two special ships and two aircraft were assigned to Khatanever for use in tests focused on the dissemination of tularaemia bacteria. Germany launched Operation Barbarossa in June 1941 and following the capture of nearby Kalinin in October, the BW facility on Gorodomlya Island was evacuated and eventually relocated to Kirov.

In his account of the history of the Soviet BW programme, Alibek, who as Kanatzhan Baizakovich Alibekov had been a biological weapons scientist for Biopreparat, describes a quite separate strand of early BW research being pursued in Leningrad. This work was allegedly initiated in the 1920s at the Leningrad Military Medical Academy under the control of OGPU (see above). According to Alibek, in 1928, the Revolutionary Military Council signed a decree about the weaponization of typhus. The Leningrad Military Medical Academy began cultivating typhus in chicken embryos. He also alleges that human experimentation occurred with typhus, glanders and melioidosis in the Solovetsky camp. Another, possibly more reliable source, regarding the Soviet BW programme in Leningrad are a series of secret reports generated by the British Secret Intelligence Service (SIS) - commonly known as MI6. A total of fourteen highly detailed reports on the Soviet BW programme were issued in the period 1924-1927. SIS identifies Petr Petrovich Maslakovets and Semen Ivanovich Zlatogorov as the lead BW scientists working on Yersinia pestis (the causative organism of plague) and other dangerous pathogens. Zlatogorov was in fact one of the world's leading authorities on pneumonic plague and had studied 40 strains of plague bacilli from around the world. He had been a leading participant of a Russian team despatched to combat the October 1910 to February 1911 outbreak of pneumonic plague in Manchuria. The SIS reports indicate that Zlatogorov and Maslakovets conducted some of their research on a so-called Plague Fort - Fort Alexander 1, located at Kronstadt. Here they aimed to develop strains of plague that remained viable when loaded into artillery shells, aerial bombs and other means of dispersal. German intelligence independently identified the secret BW programme allegedly managed by Zlatogorov and Maslakovets.

=== World War II ===
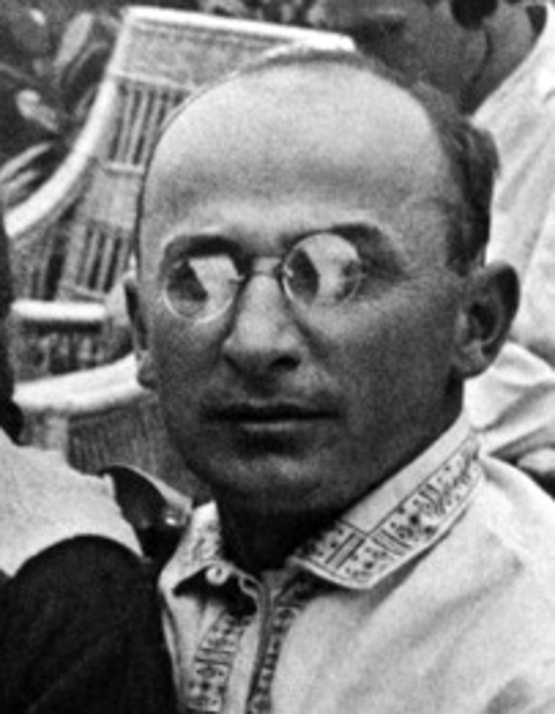
Lavrentiy Beria, commander of Soviet BW programme in 1939

By 1939, with the USSR on a war footing, the Soviet leadership is reported to have believed that the "imperialistic and fascistic countries" had actively undertaken BW preparations and that the use of such weapons, in case of emergency, was a foregone conclusion. Stalin in response ordered an acceleration of BW preparations and appointed Lavrentiy Pavlovich Beria, the head of the NKVD, in overall command of the country's biological warfare programme. In May 1941, a number of measures codenamed Yurta were implemented to counter the perceived threat of biological sabotage by the German and Japanese intelligence services. As a result there was a tightening-up of state control over personnel working on microbial pathogens and an emphasis on the gathering of intelligence from foreign legations relating to the feasibility and use of biological weapons.

On the 22 June 1941, Nazi Germany commenced Operation Barbarossa and invaded the Soviet Union along a 2,900-kilometre front. Such was the rapidity and depth of penetration of the attack that, by September, the Red Army's BW facility - the Sanitary Technical Institute (STI) - on Gorodomlya Island, was under immediate threat of capture. At some point around the 25 September, the facility was evacuated and the buildings partially destroyed. There are various accounts regarding the relocation of STI, with official Russian sources indicating that it was initially transferred to Saratov. In the later summer of 1942, in the face of the German offensive to capture Stalingrad, there was a second evacuation of STI, which was eventually permanently relocated to Kirov, located some 896 kilometres north-east of Moscow on the Vyatka river.

In his account of the Soviet BW programme, Biohazard, Alibek, a former senior manager of Biopreparat, suggests that in the late summer of 1942 the Red Army engaged in the deliberate aerosol dissemination of Francisella tularensis (the causative agent of tularaemia) against German panzer troops during the critical Battle of Stalingrad. However, a number of prominent scholars have disputed Alibek's version of events, including Erhardt Geissler. For instance, tularaemia is endemic in the region, and outbreaks had previously occurred in 1938 and the winter of 1941-1942; the disease was already present among the civilian population by the time German troops arrived. Infected rodents — rampant at the front, as sanitation systems had completely broken down and the uncollected grain harvest provided plentiful food for the rodent population — were the key to the large-scale outbreaks, which spread through inhalation of dust from contaminated straw in mattresses or from consumption of tainted food and water. Crucially, Geissler notes that there are no contemporary accounts by neither the German or Soviet armies nor intelligence services regarding the use of F. tularensis as a biological weapon at Stalingrad.

In the Far East the Soviet Union had been subject of a BW attack in 1939 during the battles of Khalkin Gol (Nomonhan) by Japan's Unit 731 under Shirō Ishii. Further attacks were initiated against the Soviet Union by Unit 100 in the summer of 1942, and at a later unspecified date, again by Unit 731. On the 9 August 1945, the Soviet Union launched its invasion of Japanese-controlled Manchuria. Two major Japanese offensive BW installations at Pingfang and Changchun were overrun by the Red Army. However, General Otozō Yamada, Commander of the Kwantung Army had already ordered the destruction and evacuation of these facilities. The NKVD now switched its focus to apprehending any personnel associated with Units 100 and 731 and began a process of filtration of the 560,000-760,000 Japanese prisoners of war. In December 1949, the military figures identified by the Soviets as participating in the Japanese BW programme were put on trial in Khabarovsk. The defendants were found guilty and sentenced to terms ranging from two to twenty-five years in Soviet labour correction camps. However, the officers, doctors and other personnel from Unit 731 were in fact transferred to the comparative comfort of the NKVD special camp No. 48 in a tsarist-era red-brick manor house located in Cherntsy (Ivanovo Oblast). The leniency with which the Japanese BW specialists were treated - the longest sentence any served was seven years - has led a number of scholars to conclude that some sort of deal was struck between the Soviet authorities and the Unit 731 personnel held captive in the USSR.

=== The Cold War ===
In the immediate post-war period, Lavrenty Beria, the Soviet minister of internal affairs, maintained control of the Soviet BW programme and further developed its offensive capabilities. The key hub of the Soviet BW programme at this time was the Scientific-Research Institute of Epidemiology and Hygiene located in Kirov. It continued to utilise the biological weapons test site on Vozrozhdeniya Island in the Aral Sea. During the period 1947-1949 a new military biological weapons facility, the USSR Ministry of Defence's Scientific-Research Institute of Hygiene, was established in Sverdlovsk, It occupied the site of the former Cherkassk-Sverdlovsk Infantry Academy on Ulitsa Zvezdnaya, 1. The new facility became operational in July 1949. Its core staff were sourced from the Kirov BW facility. The first group to arrive from Kirov included the new director of the Institute of Hygiene, Major General Nikolai Fillipovich Kopylov. The Sverdlovsk facility launched a scientific programme in 1951 which focused on botulinum toxin.

In the early 1950s the Soviet leadership became concerned that the USSR was vulnerable to attack by a new generation of virus-based biological weapons. At this time the country only possessed a single facility focused on viruses, the Moscow-based D.I. Ivanovskii Institute of Virology. In 1952, as a response to this perceived area of weakness, the Soviet government issued a special decree for the creation of the Scientific-Research Sanitary Institute (NIIS) in Zagorsk. It was transferred to the control of the USSR Ministry of Defence in March 1954. The new military institute later pursued major programmes focused on variola virus and viral haemorrhagic fevers. In his uncorroborated account, Alibek claims that capacity for the production of smallpox virus was established in Zagorsk. It was reported to use chicken eggs for the cultivation of the virus.

Just four years after the creation of the Zagorsk facility, the CPSU and the USSR Council of Ministers issued a decree "for strengthening scientific-research work in the field of microbiology and virology". This decree established a secret network of BW institutes within the USSR Ministry of Agriculture. Operating under the codename "Ekologiya" (Ecology), the new network incorporated three virology facilities. These worked in close collaboration with Soviet military virologists and focused on both animal pathogens such as FMD and exotic zoonotic infections.

In 1953 the management of the Soviet BW programme was assigned to the USSR Ministry of Defence's Fifteenth Administration. In August 1958, the latter created a new Scientific-Research Technical Bureau (NITB), the prime task of which was to create covert dual-use BW facilities at a number of pharmaceutical and microbiological enterprises. Over the next decade or so, dual-use BW production plants were created at Berdsk, Omutninsk, Penza and Kurgan. It is therefore apparent that previous perceptions by Western scholars of the Khrushchev era as contributing little to the development of the Soviet Union's biological warfare capabilities are incorrect. Rimmington argues that this "was in fact a pivotal period in the Soviet programme, when BW production technology was being transferred from the military to facilities concealed within civil manufacturing plants. This was later to manifest itself as a key feature of the subsequent Biopreparat programme".

The USSR was a signatory of 1972 Biological Weapons Convention (BWC). However, citing doubts concerning the United States’ compliance with the BWC, they subsequently augmented their biowarfare programs. The Soviet bioweapon effort became a huge program rivaling its considerable investment in nuclear arms. It comprised various institutions operating under an array of different ministries and departments including the Soviet Ministry of Defense, Ministry of Agriculture, Ministry of Health, USSR Academy of Sciences, and KGB. In April 1974, a new agency, the All-Union Science Production Association Biopreparat, was created under the Main Administration of the Microbiological Industry (Glavmikrobioprom) to spearhead the Soviet offensive BW programme. Biopreparat pursued offensive research, development, and production of biological agents under the guise of legitimate civil biotechnology research. It conducted its secret activities at numerous sites across the USSR and employed 30-40,000 people.

==== Post-BWC developments ====
The Soviet Union continued the development and mass production of offensive biological weapons, despite having signed the 1972 BWC. The development and production were conducted by a main directorate ("Biopreparat") along with the Soviet Ministry of Defense, the Soviet Ministry of Agriculture, the Soviet Ministry of Health, the USSR Academy of Sciences, the KGB, and other state organizations.

Alibek maintains that "Soviet leaders from Leonid Brezhnev to Mikhail Gorbachev personally authorized prohibited development, testing, and production efforts... [and] cites several Gorbachev decrees stepping up the pace of work within the biological weapons complex, and directing the creation of mobile production facilities so that inspectors could not uncover the program.

In the 1980s, the Soviet Ministry of Agriculture successfully developed variants of foot-and-mouth disease and rinderpest against cows, African swine fever for pigs, and psittacosis to kill chicken. These agents were prepared to be sprayed down on enemy fields from tanks attached to airplanes over hundreds of miles. The secret program was code-named "Ecology".

A production line to manufacture smallpox on an industrial scale was launched in the Vector Institute in 1990. The development of genetically altered strains of smallpox was presumably conducted in the Institute under the leadership of Dr. Sergei Netyosov in the mid-1990s, according to Kenneth Alibek. (aka Kanatjan Alibekov). In 1998, Alibek reported that "there was significant discussion of the possible use of monkeypox as a biological weapon instead of smallpox."

In 1989 the defector Vladimir Pasechnik convinced the British that the Soviets had genetically engineered a strain of Yersinia pestis to resist antibiotics. This triggered George H. W. Bush and Margaret Thatcher to pressure Gorbachev into opening for inspection several of his facilities. The visits occurred in January 1991.

It has been reported that Russia made smallpox available to Saddam Hussein in the beginning of the 1990s.

=== The post-Soviet era ===
The Nunn–Lugar Cooperative Threat Reduction aimed to secure and dismantle weapons of mass destruction, including the Soviet biological weapons program. The threat reduction assisted post-Soviet states in containing and destroying the pathogens in Soviet labs.

In the 1990s, the President of the Russian Federation, Boris Yeltsin, admitted to an offensive bio-weapons program as well as to the true nature of the Sverdlovsk anthrax leak of 1979, which had resulted in the deaths of at least 64 people. Soviet defectors, including Colonel Ken Alibek, the first deputy chief of Biopreparat from 1988 to 1992, confirmed that the program had been massive and that it still existed. On 11 April 1992, Yeltsin decreed "the termination of research on offensive biological weapons, the dismantlement of experimental technological lines for the production of biological agents and the closure of biological weapons testing facilities", and in September 1992 Yeltsin agreed in a Joint Statement on Biological Weapons with the United States and the United Kingdom that the two Western nations would "have a blanket invitation to visit facilities of concern in Russia under ground rules that guarantee unprecedented access, including access to the entire facility, the ability to take samples, the right to interview the workers and scientists, and the right to record the visits on video and audio tape." Yeltsin promised to end the Russian bio-weapons program and to convert its facilities for benevolent scientific and medical purposes.

Compliance with the agreement, as well as the fate of the former Soviet bio-agents and facilities, is still mostly undocumented. Milton LeitenBerg and Raymond Zilinskas, in The Soviet Biological Weapons Program: A History (2012), state flatly that "In March 1992...Yeltsin acknowledged the existence of an illegal bioweapons program in the former Soviet Union and ordered it to be dissolved. His decree was, however, not obeyed." They conclude that "In hindsight, we know that with the ultimate failure of the... [negotiations] process and the continued Russian refusal to open the... facilities to the present day, neither the Yeltsin or Putin administrations ever carried out 'a visible campaign to dismantle once and for all' the residual elements of the Soviet bioweapons program".

In the 1990s, specimens of deadly bacteria and viruses were stolen from western laboratories and delivered by Aeroflot planes to support the Russian biological weapons program. At least one of the pilots was a Russian Foreign Intelligence Service officer". At least two agents died, presumably from the transported pathogens.

In the 2000s, the academician, "A.S.", proposed a new biological warfare program, called the "Biological Shield of Russia" to president Vladimir Putin. The program reportedly includes institutes of the Russian Academy of Sciences from Pushchino.

In 2019, a gas explosion at the State Research Center of Virology and Biotechnology VECTOR in Novosibirsk Oblast briefly renewed attention on the Russian and Soviet programs. VECTOR is one of two facilities in the world which officially maintains the live smallpox virus, alongside the Centers for Disease Control and Prevention in Georgia, US.

As of 2021, the United States "assesses that the Russian Federation (Russia) maintains an offensive BW program and is in violation of its obligation under Articles I and II of the BWC. The issue of compliance by Russia with the BWC has been of concern for many years".

== Doctrine ==
Soviet military doctrine included two use-cases of biological weapons: strategic and operational. Strategic agents targeted cities with lethal and contagious pathogens, for which Yersinia pestis (plague), Orthopoxvirus variola (smallpox), and Coxiella burnetii (Q fever) were weaponized and stockpiled. They could be delivered via ballistic missile or cruise missile, and complemented Soviet strategic nuclear weapons. It was believed a single R-36 intercontinental ballistic missile could release enough biological bomblets to kill half the population of a city of millions such as New York City.

Operational agents were more incapacitating, for targeting military reinforcements and services in the rear of the battlefield. Burkholderia mallei (glanders), Francisella tularensis (tularemia), Alphavirus venezuelan (Venezuelan equine encephalitis), and Brucella sp. (brucellosis) could be air-delivered by cluster munitions or spray tank. Toxins including botulinum, and Enterotoxin type B, the causative agents of botulism and toxic shock syndrome respectively, were also investigated as operational weapons until the mid-1970s.

Agents were also developed to serve both strategic and operational roles: Bacillus anthracis (anthrax) and Marburg marburgvirus (Marburg virus disease).

== List of Soviet/Russian biological weapons institutions, programs and projects ==
- Biopreparat (18 labs, test sites, and production centers)
  - All-Union Scientific-Research Institute of Microbiology, Obolensk (1974-1991); later renamed as the State Research Centre for Applied Microbiology and Biotechnology
  - All-Union Scientific-Research Institute of Molecular Biology, Kol'tsovo (1974-1991): "At Koltsova access was again difficult and problematic. The most serious incident was when senior officials contradicted an admission by technical staff that research on smallpox was being conducted there."
  - All-Union Scientific-Research Institute of Highly Pure Biopreparations, Leningrad (1974-1991);
  - Berdsk Chemical Factory (1993);
  - Institute of Applied Biochemistry, Omutninsk (1994);
  - Institute of Immunology, Chekhov (1978-1991);
  - Omutninsk Chemical Factory
  - Stepnogorsk Scientific Experimental-Industrial Base
  - Vector State Research Center of Virology and Biotechnology (VECTOR), a weaponized smallpox center
- USSR Ministry of Agriculture
  - All-Union Scientific-Research Institute of Veterinary Virology and Microbiology, Pokrov (1958-1991)
  - Pokrov Factory of Biologics (1967-1991)
- USSR Ministry of Defence
  - Aralsk-7, Vozrozhdeniya (Renaissance) Island, Aral Sea, this BW test site was built here and on neighboring Komsomolskiy Island in 1954
  - Kirov bioweapons production facility, Kirov, Kirov Oblast
  - Sverdlovsk bioweapons production facility (Military Compound 19), Sverdlovsk, a weaponized anthrax center, see Sverdlovsk anthrax leak
  - Zagorsk-6, today Virological Center NIIM (Scientific research institute) Russian Defense Ministry in Sergiyev Posad.
- Poison laboratory of the Soviet secret services

"Pokrov, Berdsk and Omutninsk all revealed evidence of biological activity since 1975, such as large-scale production in hardened facilities, aerosol test chambers, excessive containment levels for current activity and accommodation for weapons-filling lines."

=== Project Bonfire ===
Project Bonfire was the codename for the budget to develop antibiotic-resistant microbial strains.

=== Project Factor ===
Project Factor was the codename for the budget to develop microbial weapons with new properties of high virulence, improved stability, and new clinical syndromes.

=== Chimera Project ===
The Chimera Project attempted in the late 1980s and early 1990s to combine DNA from Venezuelan equine encephalitis and smallpox at Obolensk, and Ebola virus and smallpox at the Vector Institute. The existence of these chimeric viruses programmes was one reason why Alibek defected to the United States in 1992. Journal articles by scientists suggest that in 1999 the experiments were still being continued.

=== Project Ekologiya ===
A Soviet-era agricultural biowarfare programme was pursued from 1958 through to the collapse of the USSR in 1991. This program focused on anti-crop and anti-livestock biological weapons, with Soviet efforts starting with FMD virus, for which an institute was established on Gorodomlya Island. The anti-livestock pathogens included: rinderpest virus; foot-and-mouth disease virus; Bacillus anthracis (the causative agent of anthrax), African swine fever virus, African horse sickness virus and sheeppox virus. Anti-crop pathogens studied and developed included: rice blast (Magnaporthe grisea), rice bacteriosis (Xanthomonas oryzae); late blight of potatoes (Phytophthora infestans); and rust diseases of wheat and other small grain crops.

From the 1970s, it focused on molecular biology and the development of genetically modified organisms. Another innovation was the "mobilization production facilities"—ostensibly civil manufacturing plants—which incorporated capacity for production of weapons in wartime emergency." Counter-proliferation efforts of the Nunn-Lugar Biological Threat Reduction program successfully averted technology transfer to authoritarian neighbors such as Iran during the decade following the dissolution of the Soviet Union.

According to The Soviet Union’s Agricultural Biowarfare Programme (2021), "The Pokrov biologics plant is the best-documented of the agricultural BW mobilisation facilities. A UK/US inspection team visited the facility in 1993 and identified five underground reinforced concrete bunkers holding hundreds of thousands of hen’s eggs being used to grow massive quantities of virus, allegedly in order to sustain a strategic weapons system."

== Notable biological agent outbreaks and accidents ==
=== Smallpox ===
An outbreak of weaponized smallpox occurred during testing in 1971. General Professor Peter Burgasov, former Chief Sanitary Physician of the Soviet Army, and a senior researcher within the program of biological weapons described this incident:

“On Vozrozhdeniya Island in the Aral Sea, the strongest formulations of smallpox were tested. Suddenly, I was informed that there were mysterious cases of mortalities in Aralsk. A research ship of the Aral fleet had come within 15 km from the island (it was forbidden to come any closer than 40 km). The lab technician of this ship took samples of plankton twice a day from the top deck. The smallpox formulation— 400 gr. of which was exploded on the island—”got her”, and she became infected. After returning home to Aralsk, she infected several people, including children. All of them died. I suspected the reason for this and called the General Chief of Staff at the Ministry of Defense and requested to forbid the Alma-Ata train from stopping in Aralsk. As a result, an epidemic throughout the country was prevented. I called Andropov, who at that time was the Chief of the KGB, and informed him of the unique formulation of smallpox obtained on Vozrozhdeniya Island.”

=== Anthrax ===
Spores of Bacillus anthracis (the causative agent of anthrax) were accidentally released from a military facility in Sverdlovsk in April 1979. The death toll was at least 66, but no one knows the precise number, because all hospital records and other evidence were destroyed by the KGB, according to former Biopreparat deputy director Kenneth Alibek.

=== Marburg virus ===
The Soviet Union reportedly had a large biological weapons program enhancing the usefulness of the Marburg virus. The development was conducted in Vector Institute under the leadership of Dr. Ustinov who was accidentally killed by the virus. The samples of Marburg taken from Ustinov's organs were more powerful than the original strain. The new strain, called "Variant U", had been successfully weaponized and approved by the Soviet Ministry of Defense in 1990.

== List of Soviet/Russian bioweaponeers ==
- Kanatzhan Alibekov, also known as Ken Alibek
- Pyotr Burgasov
- Igor Domaradskiy
- Tsyren Khanduev
- Boris Kopylev
- Yuri Ovchinnikov
- Vladimir Pasechnik at the Institute of Highly Pure Biopreparations in Leningrad
- Sergei Popov
- Sergey Rumyantsev
- Nikolai Ustinov, died of Marburg virus disease
- Ivan Mikhailovich Velikanov
- Tschernobyl

== See also ==
- History of biological warfare
- Russia and weapons of mass destruction
- United States biological weapons program
