= Biological warfare =

Use of strategically designed biological weapons

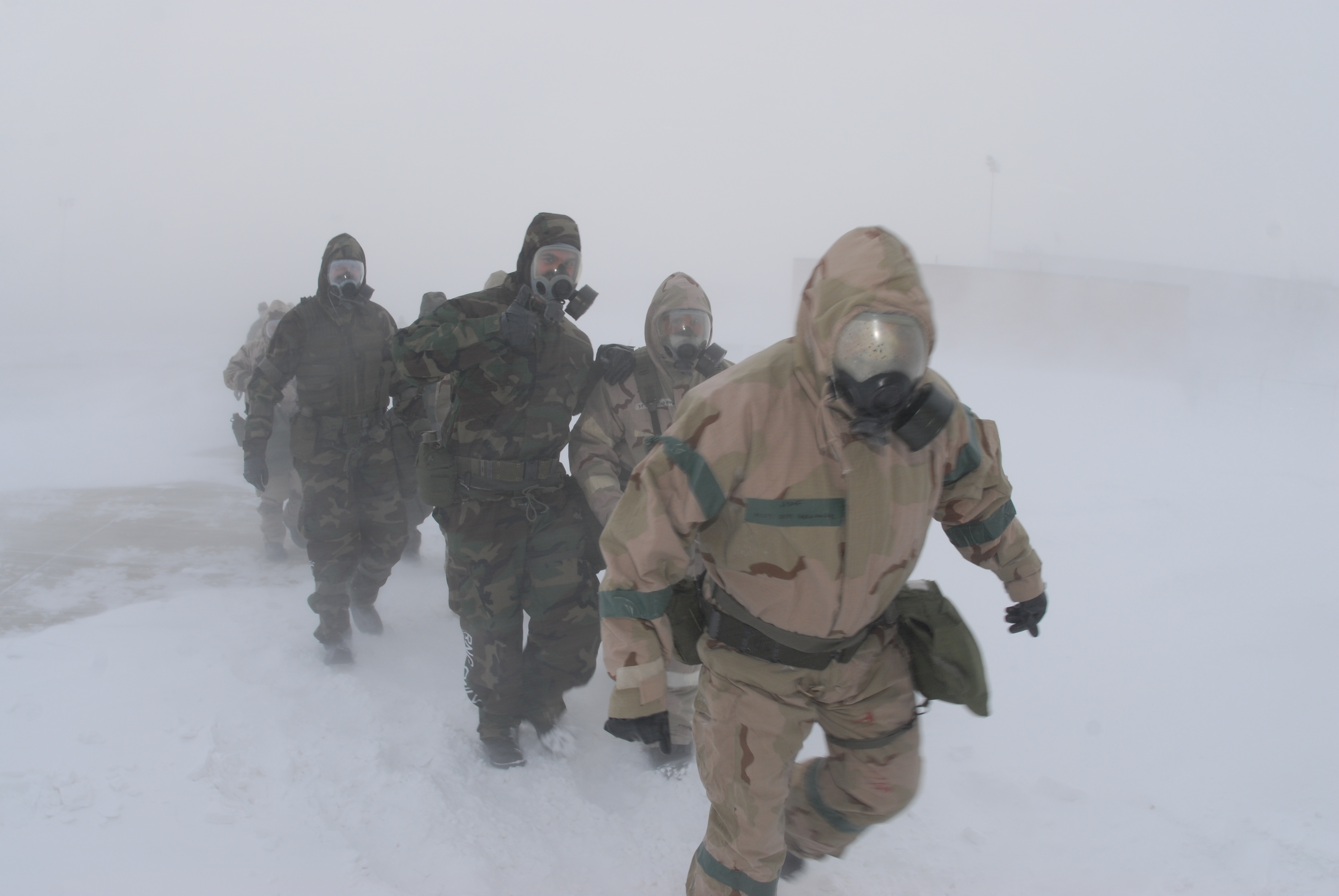
U.S. Air Force Master Sgt. Jess V. Hernandez, right, assigned to the 119th Maintenance Squadron, leads Airmen through extreme cold, harsh winds and snow on their way to chemical and biological warfare training

Biological warfare, also known as germ warfare, is the use of biological toxins or infectious agents such as bacteria (bacteriological warfare), viruses, insects, and fungi with the intent to kill, harm or incapacitate humans, animals or plants as an act of war. Biological weapons (often termed "bio-weapons", "biological threat agents", or "bio-agents") are living organisms or replicating entities (i.e. viruses, which are not universally considered "alive"). Entomological (insect) warfare is a subtype of biological warfare.

Biological warfare is subject to a forceful normative prohibition. Offensive biological warfare in international armed conflicts is a war crime under the 1925 Geneva Protocol and several international humanitarian law treaties. In particular, the 1972 Biological Weapons Convention (BWC) bans the development, production, acquisition, transfer, stockpiling and use of biological weapons. In contrast, defensive biological research for prophylactic, protective or other peaceful purposes is not prohibited by the BWC.

Biological warfare is distinct from warfare involving other types of weapons of mass destruction (WMD), including nuclear warfare, chemical warfare, and radiological warfare. None of these are considered conventional weapons, which are deployed primarily for their explosive, kinetic, or incendiary potential.

Biological weapons may be employed in various ways to gain a strategic or tactical advantage over the enemy, either by threats or by actual deployments. Like some chemical weapons, biological weapons may also be useful as area denial weapons. These agents may be lethal or non-lethal, and may be targeted against a single individual, a group of people, or even an entire population. They may be developed, acquired, stockpiled or deployed by nation states or by non-national groups. In the latter case, or if a nation-state uses it clandestinely, it may also be considered bioterrorism.

Biological warfare and chemical warfare overlap to an extent, as the use of toxins produced by some living organisms is considered under the provisions of both the BWC and the Chemical Weapons Convention. Toxins and psychochemical weapons are often referred to as mid spectrum agents. Unlike bioweapons, these midspectrum agents do not reproduce in their host and are typically characterized by shorter incubation periods.

== Overview ==
A biological attack could conceivably result in large numbers of civilian casualties and cause severe disruption to economic and societal infrastructure.

A nation or group that can pose a credible threat of mass casualty has the ability to alter the terms under which other nations or groups interact with it. When indexed to weapon mass and cost of development and storage, biological weapons possess destructive potential and loss of life far in excess of nuclear, chemical or conventional weapons. Accordingly, biological agents are potentially useful as strategic deterrents, in addition to their utility as offensive weapons on the battlefield.

As a tactical weapon for military use, a significant problem with biological warfare is that it would take days to be effective, and therefore might not immediately stop an opposing force. Some biological agents (smallpox, pneumonic plague) have the capability of person-to-person transmission via aerosolized respiratory droplets. This feature can be undesirable, as the agent(s) may be transmitted by this mechanism to unintended populations, including neutral or even friendly forces. Worse still, such a weapon could "escape" the laboratory where it was developed, even if there was no intent to use it – for example by infecting a researcher who then transmits it to the outside world before realizing that they were infected. Several cases are known of researchers becoming infected and dying of Ebola, which they had been working with in the lab (though nobody else was infected in those cases) – though there is no evidence that their work was directed towards biological warfare.

== History ==
=== Antiquity and Middle Ages ===
Rudimentary forms of biological warfare have been practiced since antiquity. The earliest documented incident of the intention to use biological weapons is recorded in Hittite texts of 1500–1200 BC, in which victims of an unknown plague (possibly tularemia) were driven into enemy lands, causing an epidemic. The Assyrians poisoned enemy wells with the fungus ergot, though with unknown results. Scythian archers dipped their arrows and Roman soldiers their swords into excrements and cadavers – victims were commonly infected by tetanus as result. In 1346, the bodies of Mongol warriors of the Golden Horde who had died of plague were thrown over the walls of the besieged Crimean city of Kaffa. Specialists disagree about whether this operation was responsible for the spread of the Black Death into Europe, Near East and North Africa, resulting in the deaths of approximately 25 million Europeans.

Biological agents were extensively used in many parts of Africa from the sixteenth century AD, most of the time in the form of poisoned arrows, or powder spread on the war front as well as poisoning of horses and water supply of the enemy forces. In Borgu, there were specific mixtures to kill, hypnotize, make the enemy bold, and to act as an antidote against the poison of the enemy as well. The creation of biologicals was reserved for a specific and professional class of medicine-men.

=== 18th to 19th century ===
During the French and Indian War, in June 1763 a group of Native Americans laid siege to British-held Fort Pitt. Following instructions of his superior, Colonel Henry Bouquet, the commander of Fort Pitt, Swiss-born Captain Simeon Ecuyer, ordered his men to take smallpox-infested blankets from the infirmary and give it to a Lenape delegation during the siege. A reported outbreak that began the spring before left as many as one hundred Native Americans dead in Ohio Country from 1763 to 1764. It is not clear whether the smallpox was a result of the Fort Pitt incident or the virus was already present among the Delaware people as outbreaks happened on their own every dozen or so years and the delegates were met again later and seemingly had not contracted smallpox. During the American Revolutionary War, Continental Army officer George Washington mentioned to the Continental Congress that he had heard a rumor from a sailor that his opponent during the Siege of Boston, General William Howe, had deliberately sent civilians out of the city in the hopes of spreading the ongoing smallpox epidemic to American lines; Washington, remaining unconvinced, wrote that he "could hardly give credit to" the claim. Washington had already inoculated his soldiers, diminishing the effect of the epidemic. Some historians have claimed that a detachment of the Corps of Royal Marines stationed in New South Wales, Australia, deliberately used smallpox there in 1789. Dr Seth Carus states: "Ultimately, we have a strong circumstantial case supporting the theory that someone deliberately introduced smallpox in the Aboriginal population."

=== World War I ===
By 1900 the germ theory and advances in bacteriology brought a new level of sophistication to the techniques for possible use of bio-agents in war. Biological sabotage in the form of anthrax and glanders was undertaken on behalf of the Imperial German government during World War I (1914–1918), with indifferent results. The Geneva Protocol of 1925 prohibited the first use of chemical and biological weapons against enemy nationals in international armed conflicts.

=== World War II ===
With the onset of World War II, the Ministry of Supply in the United Kingdom established a biological warfare program at Porton Down, headed by the microbiologist Paul Fildes. The research was championed by Winston Churchill and soon tularemia, anthrax, brucellosis, and botulism toxins had been effectively weaponized. In particular, Gruinard Island in Scotland, was contaminated with anthrax during a series of extensive tests for the next 56 years. Although the UK never offensively used the biological weapons it developed, its program was the first to successfully weaponize a variety of deadly pathogens and bring them into industrial production. Other nations, notably France and Japan, had begun their own biological weapons programs.

When the United States entered the war, Allied resources were pooled at the request of the British. The US then established a large research program and industrial complex at Fort Detrick, Maryland, in 1942 under the direction of George W. Merck. The biological and chemical weapons developed during that period were tested at the Dugway Proving Grounds in Utah. Soon there were facilities for the mass production of anthrax spores, brucellosis, and botulism toxins, although the war was over before these weapons could be of much operational use.

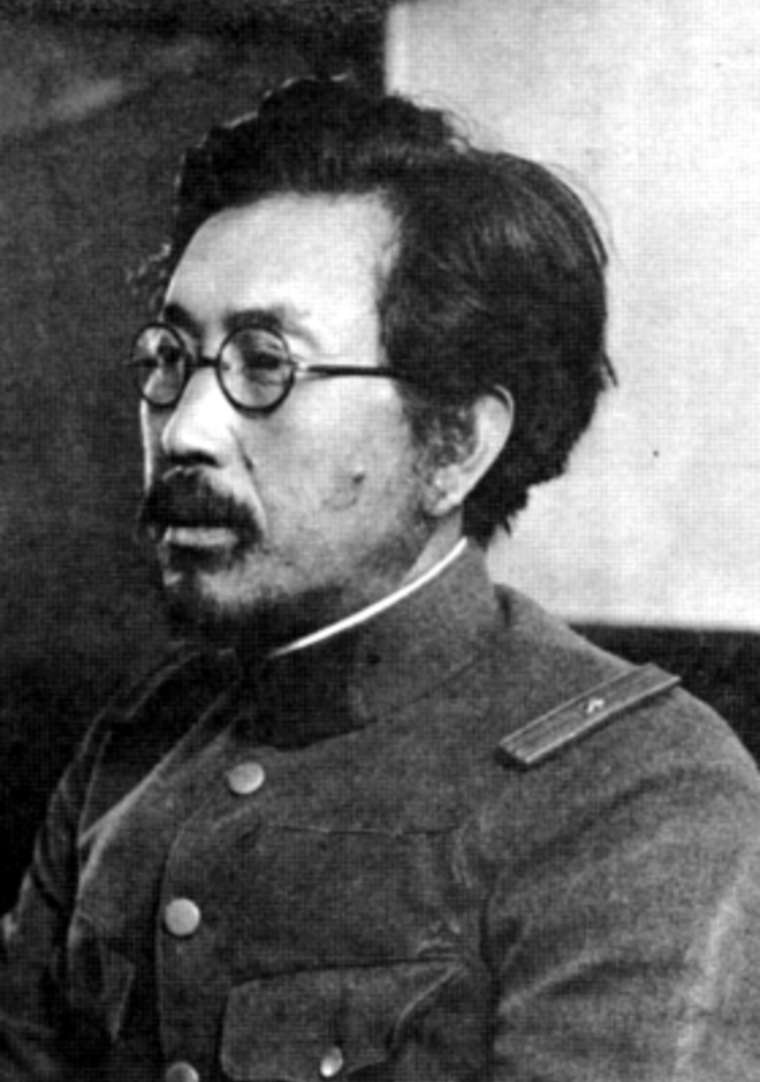
Shirō Ishii, commander of Unit 731, which performed human vivisections and other biological experimentation

The most notorious program of the period was run by the secret Imperial Japanese Army Unit 731 during the war, based at Pingfang in Manchuria and commanded by Lieutenant General Shirō Ishii. This biological warfare research unit conducted often fatal human experiments on prisoners, and produced biological weapons for combat use. Although the Japanese effort lacked the technological sophistication of the American or British programs, it far outstripped them in its widespread application and indiscriminate brutality. Biological weapons were used against Chinese soldiers and civilians in several military campaigns. In 1940, the Japanese Army Air Force bombed Ningbo with ceramic bombs full of fleas carrying the bubonic plague. Many of these operations were ineffective due to inefficient delivery systems, although up to 200,000 people may have died. During the Zhejiang-Jiangxi Campaign in 1942, around 1,700 Japanese troops died out of a total 10,000 Japanese soldiers who fell ill with disease when their own biological weapons attack rebounded on their own forces.

During the final months of World War II, Japan planned to use plague as a biological weapon against US civilians in San Diego, California, during Operation Cherry Blossoms at Night. While the plan was finalized in late March 1945, it was cancelled shortly thereafter due to the strong opposition of Chief of General Staff Yoshijirō Umezu. Umezu later explained his decision as such: "If bacteriological warfare is conducted, it will grow from the dimension of war between Japan and America to an endless battle of humanity against bacteria. Japan will earn the derision of the world."

=== Arab–Israeli conflict ===
According to historians Benny Morris and Benjamin Kedar, Israel conducted a biological warfare operation codenamed Operation Cast Thy Bread during the 1948 Arab–Israeli War. The Haganah initially used typhoid bacteria to contaminate water wells in newly cleared Arab villages to prevent the population including militiamen from returning. Later, the biological warfare campaign expanded to include Jewish settlements that were in imminent danger of being captured by Arab troops and inhabited Arab towns not slated for capture. There was also plans to expand the biological warfare campaign into other Arab states including Egypt, Lebanon and Syria, but they were not carried out.

Some British soldiers were also poisoned: causing the event to gain international attention.

Later, in the 1970s, Israel poisoned Palestinian land in the West Bank so they could establish Israeli settlements.

=== Cold War ===
In Britain, the 1950s saw the weaponization of plague, brucellosis, tularemia and later equine encephalomyelitis and vaccinia viruses, but the programme was unilaterally cancelled in 1956. The United States Army Biological Warfare Laboratories weaponized anthrax, tularemia, brucellosis, Q-fever and others.

In 1969, US President Richard Nixon decided to unilaterally terminate the offensive biological weapons program of the US, allowing only scientific research for defensive measures. This decision increased the momentum of the negotiations for a ban on biological warfare, which took place from 1969 to 1972 in the United Nations' Conference of the Committee on Disarmament in Geneva. These negotiations resulted in the Biological Weapons Convention, which was opened for signature on 10 April 1972 and entered into force on 26 March 1975 after its ratification by 22 states.

Despite being a party and depositary to the BWC, the Soviet Union continued and expanded its massive offensive biological weapons program, under the leadership of the allegedly civilian institution Biopreparat. The Soviet Union attracted international suspicion after the 1979 Sverdlovsk anthrax leak killed approximately 65 to 100 people.

== International law ==
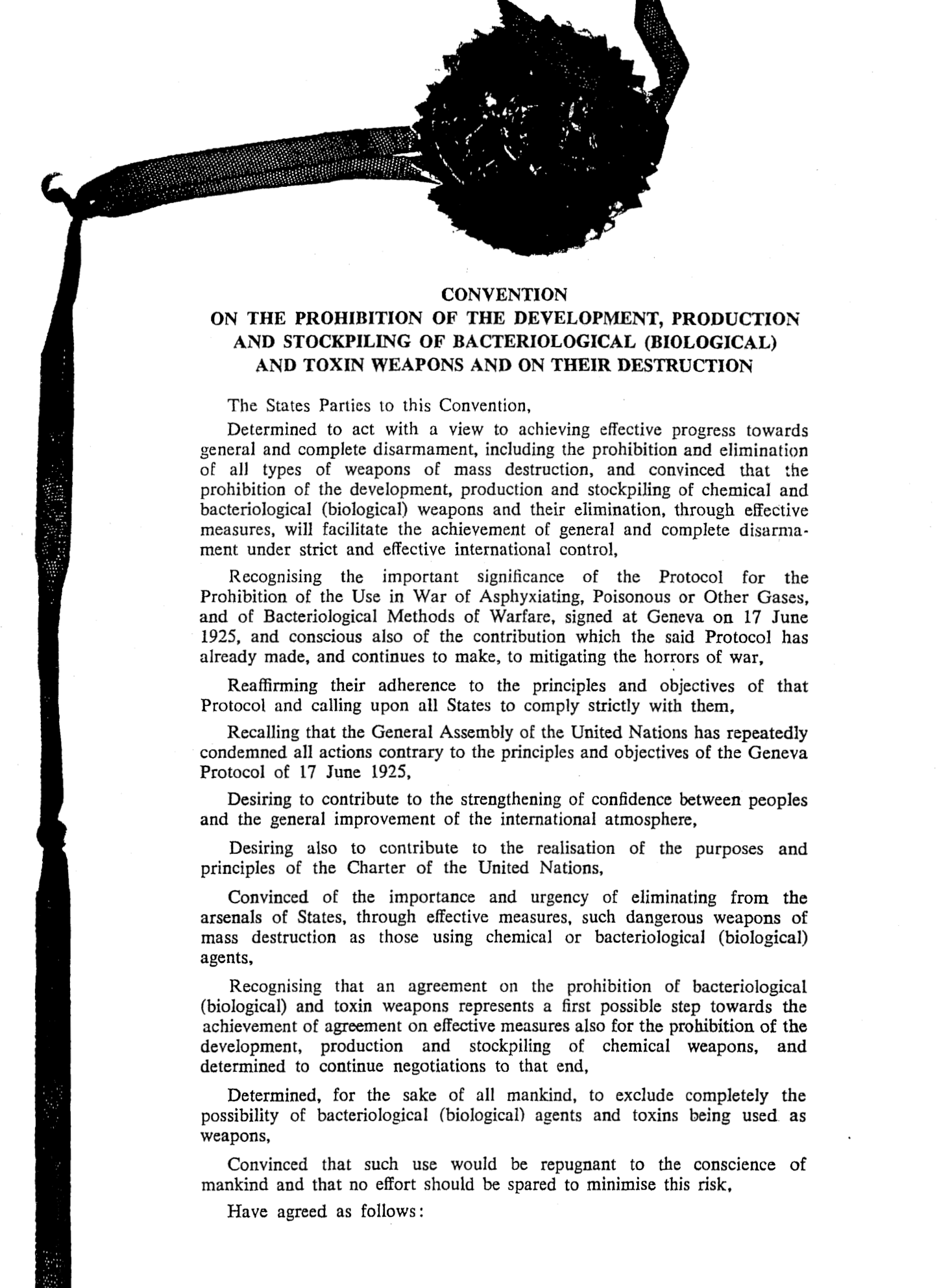
The Biological Weapons Convention

International restrictions on biological warfare began with the 1925 Geneva Protocol, which prohibits the use but not the possession or development of biological and chemical weapons in international armed conflicts. Upon ratification of the Geneva Protocol, several countries made reservations regarding its applicability and use in retaliation. Due to these reservations, it was in practice a "no-first-use" agreement only.

The 1972 Biological Weapons Convention (BWC) supplements the Geneva Protocol by prohibiting the development, production, acquisition, transfer, stockpiling and use of biological weapons. Having entered into force on 26 March 1975, the BWC was the first multilateral disarmament treaty to ban the production of an entire category of weapons of mass destruction. As of March 2021, 183 states have become party to the treaty. The BWC is considered to have established a strong global norm against biological weapons, which is reflected in the treaty's preamble, stating that the use of biological weapons would be "repugnant to the conscience of mankind". The BWC's effectiveness has been limited due to insufficient institutional support and the absence of any formal verification regime to monitor compliance.

In 1985, the Australia Group was established, a multilateral export control regime of 43 countries aiming to prevent the proliferation of chemical and biological weapons.

In 2004, the United Nations Security Council passed Resolution 1540, which obligates all UN Member States to develop and enforce appropriate legal and regulatory measures against the proliferation of chemical, biological, radiological, and nuclear weapons and their means of delivery, in particular, to prevent the spread of weapons of mass destruction to non-state actors.

== Bioterrorism ==
Biological weapons are difficult to detect, economical and easy to use, making them appealing to terrorists. The cost of a biological weapon is estimated to be about 0.05 percent the cost of a conventional weapon in order to produce similar numbers of mass casualties per kilometer square. Moreover, their production is very easy as common technology can be used to produce biological warfare agents, like that used in production of vaccines, foods, spray devices, beverages and antibiotics. A major factor in biological warfare that attracts terrorists is that they can easily escape before the government agencies or secret agencies have even started their investigation. This is because the potential organism has an incubation period of 3 to 7 days, after which the results begin to appear, thereby giving terrorists a lead.

A technique called Clustered, Regularly Interspaced, Short Palindromic Repeat (CRISPR-Cas9) is now so cheap and widely available that scientists fear that amateurs will start experimenting with them. In this technique, a DNA sequence is cut off and replaced with a new sequence, e.g. one that codes for a particular protein, with the intent of modifying an organism's traits. Concerns have emerged regarding do-it-yourself biology research organizations due to their associated risk that a rogue amateur DIY researcher could attempt to develop dangerous bioweapons using genome editing technology.

In 2002, when CNN went through Al-Qaeda's (AQ's) experiments with crude poisons, they found out that AQ had begun planning ricin and cyanide attacks with the help of a loose association of terrorist cells. The associates had infiltrated many countries like Turkey, Italy, Spain, France and others. In 2015, to combat the threat of bioterrorism, a National Blueprint for Biodefense was issued by the Blue-Ribbon Study Panel on Biodefense. Also, 233 potential exposures of select biological agents outside of the primary barriers of the biocontainment in the US were described by the annual report of the Federal Select Agent Program.

Though a verification system can reduce bioterrorism, an employee, or a lone terrorist having adequate knowledge of a bio-technology company's facilities, can cause potential danger by using, without proper oversight and supervision, that company's resources. Moreover, it has been found that about 95% of accidents that have occurred due to low security have been done by employees or those who had a security clearance.

== Entomology ==
Entomological warfare (EW) is a type of biological warfare that uses insects to attack the enemy. The concept has existed for centuries and research and development have continued into the modern era. EW has been used in battle by Japan and several other nations have developed and been accused of using an entomological warfare program. EW may employ insects in a direct attack or as vectors to deliver a biological agent, such as plague. Essentially, EW exists in three varieties. One type of EW involves infecting insects with a pathogen and then dispersing the insects over target areas. The insects then act as a vector, infecting any person or animal they might bite. Another type of EW is a direct insect attack against crops; the insect may not be infected with any pathogen but instead represents a threat to agriculture. The final method uses uninfected insects, such as bees or wasps, to directly attack the enemy.

== Genetics ==
Theoretically, novel approaches in biotechnology, such as synthetic biology could be used in the future to design novel types of biological warfare agents.

1. Would demonstrate how to render a vaccine ineffective;
2. Would confer resistance to therapeutically useful antibiotics or antiviral agents;
3. Would enhance the virulence of a pathogen or render a nonpathogen virulent;
4. Would increase the transmissibility of a pathogen;
5. Would alter the host range of a pathogen;
6. Would enable the evasion of diagnostic/detection tools;
7. Would enable the weaponization of a biological agent or toxin.

Most of the biosecurity concerns in synthetic biology are focused on the role of DNA synthesis and the risk of producing genetic material of lethal viruses (e.g. 1918 Spanish flu, polio) in the lab. Recently, the CRISPR/Cas system has emerged as a promising technique for gene editing. It was hailed by The Washington Post as "the most important innovation in the synthetic biology space in nearly 30 years." While other methods take months or years to edit gene sequences, CRISPR speeds that time up to weeks. Due to its ease of use and accessibility, it has raised a number of ethical concerns, especially surrounding its use in the biohacking space.

Synthetic biology provides the technical capacity to fundamentally alter the bioweapons landscape by enabling the reconstitution of an eradicated or extinct human pathogen. Reports highlight the immediate security concern of "re-creating known pathogen viruses". This capability drastically lowers the barrier to entry for acquiring highly dangerous agents. The deliberate synthesis of the Horsepox virus, an Orthopoxvirus, from commercially acquired DNA segments, stands as a critical academic demonstration of this dual-use capability. This experiment proved that highly complex pox viruses could be engineered.

== By target ==
=== Anti-personnel ===
The international biological hazard symbol

Ideal characteristics of a biological agent to be used as a weapon against humans are high infectivity, high virulence, non-availability of vaccines and availability of an effective and efficient delivery system. Stability of the weaponized agent (the ability of the agent to retain its infectivity and virulence after a prolonged period of storage) may also be desirable, particularly for military applications, and the ease of creating one is often considered. Control of the spread of the agent may be another desired characteristic.

The primary difficulty is not the production of the biological agent, as many biological agents used in weapons can be manufactured relatively quickly, cheaply and easily. Rather, it is the weaponization, storage, and delivery in an effective vehicle to a vulnerable target that pose significant problems.

For example, Bacillus anthracis is considered an effective agent for several reasons. First, it forms hardy spores, perfect for dispersal aerosols. Second, this organism is not considered transmissible from person to person, and thus rarely if ever causes secondary infections. A pulmonary anthrax infection starts with ordinary influenza-like symptoms and progresses to a lethal hemorrhagic mediastinitis within 3–7 days, with a fatality rate that is 90% or higher in untreated patients. Finally, friendly personnel and civilians can be protected with suitable antibiotics.

Agents considered for weaponization, or known to be weaponized, include bacteria such as Bacillus anthracis, Brucella spp., Burkholderia mallei, Burkholderia pseudomallei, Chlamydophila psittaci, Coxiella burnetii, Francisella tularensis, some of the Rickettsiaceae (especially Rickettsia prowazekii and Rickettsia rickettsii), Shigella spp., Vibrio cholerae, and Yersinia pestis. Many viral agents have been studied and weaponized, including some of the Bunyaviridae (especially Rift Valley fever virus), Ebolavirus, many of the Flaviviridae (especially Japanese encephalitis virus), Machupo virus, Coronaviruses, Marburg virus, Variola virus, and yellow fever virus. Fungal agents that have been studied include Coccidioides spp.

Toxins that can be used as weapons include ricin, staphylococcal enterotoxin B, botulinum toxin, saxitoxin, and many mycotoxins. These toxins and the organisms that produce them are sometimes referred to as select agents. In the United States, their possession, use, and transfer are regulated by the Centers for Disease Control and Prevention's Select Agent Program.

The former US biological warfare program categorized its weaponized anti-personnel bio-agents as either Lethal Agents (Bacillus anthracis, Francisella tularensis, Botulinum toxin) or Incapacitating Agents (Brucella suis, Coxiella burnetii, Venezuelan equine encephalitis virus, Staphylococcal enterotoxin B).

=== Anti-agriculture ===
==== Anti-crop/anti-vegetation/anti-fisheries ====
The United States developed an anti-crop capability during the Cold War that used plant diseases (bioherbicides, or mycoherbicides) for destroying enemy agriculture. Biological weapons also target fisheries as well as water-based vegetation. It was believed that the destruction of enemy agriculture on a strategic scale could thwart Sino-Soviet aggression in a general war. Diseases such as wheat blast and rice blast were weaponized in aerial spray tanks and cluster bombs for delivery to enemy watersheds in agricultural regions to initiate epiphytotic (epidemics among plants). On the other hand, some sources report that these agents were stockpiled but never weaponized. When the United States renounced its offensive biological warfare program in 1969 and 1970, the vast majority of its biological arsenal was composed of these plant diseases. Enterotoxins and Mycotoxins were not affected by Nixon's order.

Though herbicides are chemicals, they are often grouped with biological warfare and chemical warfare because they may work in a similar manner as biotoxins or bioregulators. The Army Biological Laboratory tested each agent and the Army's Technical Escort Unit was responsible for the transport of all chemical, biological, radiological (nuclear) materials.

Biological warfare can also specifically target plants to destroy crops or defoliate vegetation. The United States and Britain discovered plant growth regulators (i.e., herbicides) during the Second World War, which were then used by the UK in the counterinsurgency operations of the Malayan Emergency. Inspired by the use in Malaysia, the US military effort in the Vietnam War included a mass dispersal of a variety of herbicides, famously Agent Orange, with the aim of destroying farmland and defoliating forests used as cover by the Viet Cong. Sri Lanka deployed military defoliants in its prosecution of the Eelam War against Tamil insurgents.

==== Anti-livestock ====
During World War I, German saboteurs used anthrax and glanders to sicken cavalry horses in US and France, sheep in Romania, and livestock in Argentina intended for the Entente forces. One of these German saboteurs was Anton Dilger. Also, Germany itself became a victim of similar attacks – horses bound for Germany were infected with Burkholderia by French operatives in Switzerland.

During World War II, the US and Canada secretly investigated the use of rinderpest, a highly lethal disease of cattle, as a bioweapon.

In the 1980s Soviet Ministry of Agriculture had successfully developed variants of foot-and-mouth disease, and rinderpest against cows, African swine fever for pigs, and psittacosis for chickens. These agents were prepared to spray them down from tanks attached to airplanes over hundreds of miles. The secret program was code-named "Ecology".

During the Mau Mau Uprising in 1952, the poisonous latex of the African milk bush was used to kill cattle.

== Defensive operations ==
=== Medical countermeasures ===
In 2010 at The Meeting of the States Parties to the Convention on the Prohibition of the Development, Production and Stockpiling of Bacteriological (Biological) and Toxin Weapons and Their Destruction in Geneva the sanitary epidemiological reconnaissance was suggested as well-tested means for enhancing the monitoring of infections and parasitic agents, for the practical implementation of the International Health Regulations (2005). The aim was to prevent and minimize the consequences of natural outbreaks of dangerous infectious diseases as well as the threat of alleged use of biological weapons against BTWC States Parties.

Many countries require their active-duty military personnel to get vaccinated for certain diseases that may potentially be used as a bioweapon such as anthrax, smallpox, and various other vaccines depending on the Area of Operations of the individual military units and commands.

=== Public health and disease surveillance ===
Most classical and modern biological weapons' pathogens can be obtained from a plant or an animal which is naturally infected.

In the largest biological weapons accident known—the anthrax outbreak in Sverdlovsk (now Yekaterinburg) in the Soviet Union in 1979—sheep became ill with anthrax as far as 200 kilometers (120 mi) from the release point of the organism from a military facility in the southeastern portion of the city and still off-limits to visitors today, (see Sverdlovsk Anthrax leak).

Thus, a robust surveillance system involving human clinicians and veterinarians may identify a bioweapons attack early in the course of an epidemic, permitting the prophylaxis of disease in the vast majority of people (and animals) exposed but not yet ill.

For example, in the case of anthrax, it is likely that by 24–36 hours after an attack, some small percentage of individuals (those with the compromised immune system or who had received a large dose of the organism due to proximity to the release point) will become ill with classical symptoms and signs (including a virtually unique chest X-ray finding, often recognized by public health officials if they receive timely reports). The incubation period for humans is estimated to be about 11.8 days to 12.1 days. This suggested period is the first model that is independently consistent with data from the largest known human outbreak. These projections refine previous estimates of the distribution of early-onset cases after a release and support a recommended 60-day course of prophylactic antibiotic treatment for individuals exposed to low doses of anthrax. By making these data available to local public health officials in real time, most models of anthrax epidemics indicate that more than 80% of an exposed population can receive antibiotic treatment before becoming symptomatic, and thus avoid the moderately high mortality of the disease.

=== Common epidemiological warnings ===
From most specific to least specific:

1. Single cause of a certain disease caused by an uncommon agent, with lack of an epidemiological explanation.
2. Unusual, rare, genetically engineered strain of an agent.
3. High morbidity and mortality rates in regards to patients with the same or similar symptoms.
4. Unusual presentation of the disease.
5. Unusual geographic or seasonal distribution.
6. Stable endemic disease, but with an unexplained increase in relevance.
7. Rare transmission (aerosols, food, water).
8. No illness presented in people who were/are not exposed to "common ventilation systems (have separate closed ventilation systems) when illness is seen in persons in close proximity who have a common ventilation system."
9. Different and unexplained diseases coexisting in the same patient without any other explanation.
10. Rare illness that affects a large, disparate population (respiratory disease might suggest the pathogen or agent was inhaled).
11. Illness is unusual for a certain population or age-group in which it takes presence.
12. Unusual trends of death and illness in animal populations, previous to or accompanying illness in humans.
13. Many affected reaching out for treatment at the same time.
14. Similar genetic makeup of agents in affected individuals.
15. Simultaneous collections of similar illness in non-contiguous areas, domestic, or foreign.
16. An abundance of cases of unexplained diseases and deaths.

=== Bioweapon identification ===
The goal of biodefense is to integrate the sustained efforts of the national and homeland security, medical, public health, intelligence, diplomatic, and law enforcement communities. Health care providers and public health officers are among the first lines of defense. In some countries private, local, and provincial (state) capabilities are being augmented by and coordinated with federal assets, to provide layered defenses against biological weapon attacks. During the first Gulf War the United Nations activated a biological and chemical response team, Task Force Scorpio, to respond to any potential use of weapons of mass destruction on civilians.

The traditional approach toward protecting agriculture, food, and water: focusing on the natural or unintentional introduction of a disease is being strengthened by focused efforts to address current and anticipated future biological weapons threats that may be deliberate, multiple, and repetitive.

The growing threat of biowarfare agents and bioterrorism has led to the development of specific field tools that perform on-the-spot analysis and identification of encountered suspect materials. One such technology, being developed by researchers from the Lawrence Livermore National Laboratory (LLNL), employs a "sandwich immunoassay", in which fluorescent dye-labeled antibodies aimed at specific pathogens are attached to silver and gold nanowires.

In the Netherlands, the company TNO has designed Bioaerosol Single Particle Recognition eQuipment (BiosparQ). This system would be implemented into the national response plan for bioweapon attacks in the Netherlands.

Researchers at Ben Gurion University in Israel are developing a different device called the BioPen, essentially a "Lab-in-a-Pen", which can detect known biological agents in under 20 minutes using an adaptation of the ELISA, a similar widely employed immunological technique, that in this case incorporates fiber optics.

== List of programs, projects and sites by country ==
=== United States ===
- Fort Detrick, Maryland
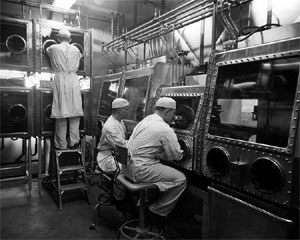
  Researchers working in Class III cabinets at the US Army Biological Warfare Laboratories, Camp Detrick, Maryland (1940s).
  - US Army Biological Warfare Laboratories (1943–69)
    - Building 470
    - One-Million-Liter Test Sphere
    - Operation Sea-Spray
    - Operation Whitecoat (1954–73)
  - US entomological warfare program
    - Operation Big Itch
    - Operation Big Buzz
    - Operation Drop Kick
    - Operation May Day
- Project Bacchus
- Project Clear Vision
- Project SHAD
- Project 112
- Horn Island Testing Station
- Fort Terry
- Granite Peak Installation
- Vigo Ordnance Plant

=== United Kingdom ===
- Porton Down
- Gruinard Island
- Nancekuke
- Operation Vegetarian (1942–1944)
- Open-air field tests:
  - Operation Harness off Antigua, 1948–1950.
  - Operation Cauldron off Stornoway, 1952.
  - Operation Hesperus off Stornoway, 1953.
  - Operation Ozone off Nassau, 1954.
  - Operation Negation off Nassau, 1954–5.

=== Soviet Union and Russia ===
- Biopreparat (18 labs and production centers)
  - Stepnogorsk Scientific and Technical Institute for Microbiology, Stepnogorsk, northern Kazakhstan
  - Institute of Ultra Pure Biochemical Preparations, Leningrad, a weaponized plague center
  - Vector State Research Center of Virology and Biotechnology (VECTOR), a weaponized smallpox center
  - Institute of Applied Biochemistry, Omutninsk
  - Kirov bioweapons production facility, Kirov, Kirov Oblast
  - Zagorsk smallpox production facility, Zagorsk
  - Berdsk bioweapons production facility, Berdsk
  - Bioweapons research facility, Obolensk
  - Sverdlovsk bioweapons production facility (Military Compound 19), Sverdlovsk, a weaponized anthrax center
- Institute of Virus Preparations
- Poison laboratory of the Soviet secret services
- Vozrozhdeniya
- Project Bonfire
- Project Factor

=== Japan ===
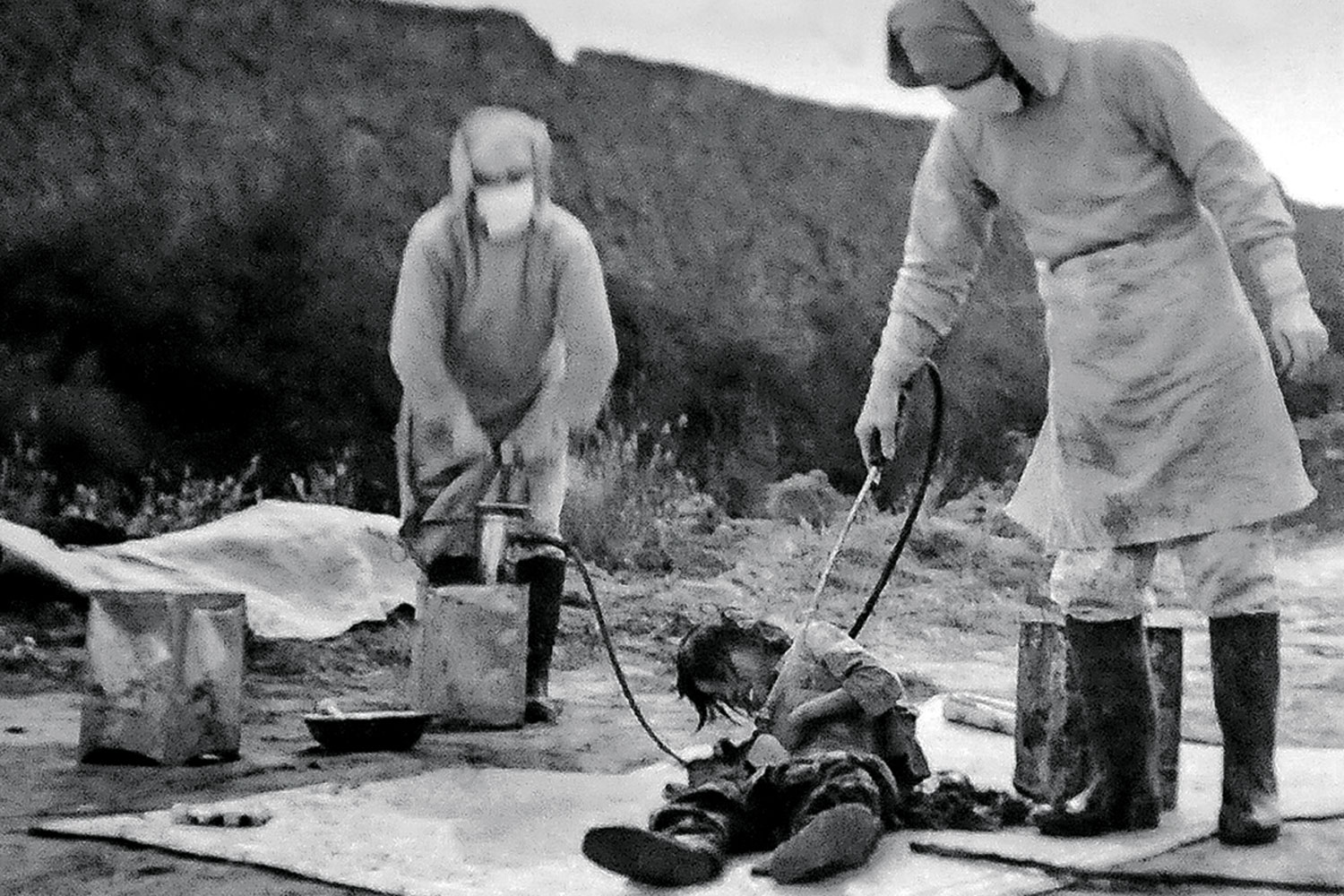
US authorities granted Unit 731 officials immunity from prosecution in return for access to their research.

- Unit 731
- Zhongma Fortress
- Kaimingjie germ weapon attack
- Khabarovsk War Crime Trials
- Epidemic Prevention and Water Purification Department

=== Iraq ===
- Al Hakum
- Salman Pak facility
- Al Manal facility

=== South Africa ===
- Project Coast
- Delta G Scientific Company
- Roodeplaat Research Laboratories
- Protechnik

=== Canada ===
- Grosse Isle, Quebec, site (1939–45) of research into anthrax and other agents
- DRDC Suffield, Suffield, Alberta

== List of associated people ==
Bioweaponeers:

Includes scientists and administrators

- Shyh-Ching Lo
- Kanatjan Alibekov, known as Ken Alibek
- Ira Baldwin
- Wouter Basson
- Kurt Blome
- Eugen von Haagen
- Anton Dilger
- Paul Fildes
- Arthur Galston (unwittingly)
- Kurt Gutzeit
- Riley D. Housewright
- Shirō Ishii
- Elvin A. Kabat
- George W. Merck
- Frank Olson
- Vladimir Pasechnik
- William C. Patrick III
- Sergei Popov
- Theodor Rosebury
- Rihab Rashid Taha
- Prince Tsuneyoshi Takeda
- Huda Salih Mahdi Ammash
- Nassir al-Hindawi
- Erich Traub
- Auguste Trillat
- Baron Otto von Rosen
- Yujiro Wakamatsu
- Yazid Sufaat

Writers and activists:

- Jack Trudel
- Daniel Barenblatt
- Leonard A. Cole
- Stephen Endicott
- Arthur Galston
- Jeanne Guillemin
- Edward Hagerman
- Sheldon H. Harris
- Nicholas D. Kristof
- Joshua Lederberg
- Matthew Meselson
- Toby Ord
- Richard Preston
- Ed Regis
- Mark Wheelis
- David Willman
- Aaron Henderson

== See also ==
- Animal-borne bomb attacks
- Antibiotic resistance
- Asymmetric warfare
- Baker Island
- Bioaerosol
- Biological contamination
- Biological pest control
- Biosecurity
- Chemical weapon
- Counterinsurgency
- Discredited AIDS origins theories
- Enterotoxin
- Entomological warfare
- Ethnic bioweapon
- Herbicidal warfare
- Hittite plague
- Human experimentation in the United States
- John W. Powell
- Johnston Atoll Chemical Agent Disposal System
- List of CBRN warfare forces
- McNeill's law
- Military animal
- Mycotoxin
- Plum Island Animal Disease Center
- Project 112
- Project AGILE
- Project SHAD
- Rhodesia and weapons of mass destruction
- Trichothecene
- Well poisoning
- Yellow rain
