= Sergei Popov (bioweaponeer) =

Soviet biologist

Sergei Popov is a Russian biologist and bioweaponeer formerly in the Soviet biological weapons program. He defected to the West in 1992 and now lives and works in the United States.

== Biography ==
After obtaining his degree in biochemistry, Popov served as a division head at the State Research Center of Virology and Biotechnology (known as "Vector") and at Obolensk, both branches of the Soviet bio-weapons program dedicated to developing genetically enhanced products. His position led him to expand his researches into the fields of molecular biology and microbiology.

Popov worked at Vector from 1976 to 1986 and at Obolensk from 1986 until 1992. His work included "designer" bio-agents that would cause the symptoms of lupus and rheumatoid arthritis, in which a victim's auto-immune system attacks its own body. His team inserted genes into viruses to make protein fragments of myelin (the sheathing around nerves). Victims that became infected would develop multiple sclerosis, a degenerative disease of the nervous system. By splicing myelin into Legionella (Legionnaires' disease), they also created an agent that caused brain damage, paralysis and death. The recombinant Legionella was very infectious and lethal with only a few cells causing disease.

At Oblensk, Popov and his team spliced the diphtheria toxin gene into the plague bacterium, thus creating a highly virulent and deadly strain.

Popov has described Biopreparat's "Project Bonfire", whose goal was to develop antibiotic-resistant microbial strains, and "Project Factor", whose goal was to create microbial weapons with new biologic properties that would result in high virulence, improved stability, and new clinical syndromes.

In 1992, Popov defected to the United Kingdom and later traveled to the United States. He worked for Hadron, Inc. in microbiology and pharmacology and at George Mason University.
