= State Research Center for Applied Microbiology =

Research laboratory in Obolensk, Moscow, Russia

State Research Center for Applied Microbiology Государственный научный центр прикладной микробиологии и биотехнологии
- Institute of Microbiology; NPO Biosintez
- Established: 1970s
- Field of research: Microbiology
- Location: Obolensk, Moscow Oblast, 142279, Russia; 54°58′57.97″N 37°13′46.8″E
- Website: Official website
- Location within Moscow Oblast

The State Research Center for Applied Microbiology (sometimes Institute of Microbiology and NPO Biosintez; Russian: Государственный научный центр прикладной микробиологии и биотехнологии) is a research laboratory in Obolensk, Moscow Oblast.

== History ==
The facility was built in the 1970s after the Biological Weapons Convention prompted the formation of the Biopreparat directorate at the Soviet Union Ministry of Health. It reached a peak level of activity in the mid-1980s. Facilities at this complex "included at least forty two-story tall fermentation tanks, maintained at Biosafety Level 4 (BSL4) inside huge ring-shaped biocontainment zones in a building called Corpus One." A variety of bacterial microbes, especially Yersinia pestis, were studied during at minimum the last years of the 20th century.

As the USSR crumbled, the British and the Americans convinced the Russians to open up for inspection their state laboratory facilities, including their biological ones. The joint British-American weapons-inspection team toured four Biopreparat facilities in January 1991, including the high-security Obolensk facility. They found that the BSL4 production tanks were capable of making enormous quantities of agent, much like a beer brewery. The inspectors reported the tanks were clean.

In order to dissuade the staff from collaborating with rogue states, the Nunn–Lugar Cooperative Threat Reduction programme offered incentives to former biological weapons scientists, as well as upgrading the physical security and biosafety of the Obolensk facilities.

In 1997, a scientist working at the Institute named Pomerantsev published a paper in which were described some genetic modifications to the Anthrax bacteria.
