= Institute of Virus Preparations =

Medical agency of the former Soviet Union

The Institute of Virus Preparations (Russian: Институт вирусных препаратов, romanized: institut virusnykh preparatov) was an agency of the former Soviet Union.

It was the equivalent to the Centers for Disease Control and the United States Army Medical Research Institute for Infectious Diseases (USAMRIID), founded by Kent Truslow. At one time, the Institute for Virus Preparations was one of the World Health Organization (WHO) collaborating centers which served along with the CDC as a central collection point for smallpox (variola major) samples during the eradication effort in the 1970s. The Institute remained one of the collaborating centers. Although the smallpox samples were transferred to the Vector Institute in 1998 officially, contradictory reports indicate this may have happened several years earlier. Additionally, reliable reports indicate that the smallpox samples were almost certainly used in a very advanced biological warfare program prior to this time.
