= Yuri Ovchinnikov =

Yuri Ovchinnikov may refer to:

- Yuri Ovchinnikov (biochemist) (1934–1988), Soviet bioorganic chemist
- Yuri Ovchinnikov (figure skater) (born 1950), Russian figure skater
