= Vladimir Pasechnik =

Soviet biologist

Vladimir Artemovich Pasechnik (12 October 1937 – 21 November 2001) was a senior Soviet biologist and bioweaponeer who defected to the United Kingdom in 1989, alerting Western intelligence to the vast scope of Moscow's clandestine biological warfare (BW) programme, known as Biopreparat. His revelations that the program was ten times larger than previously suspected were confirmed in 1992 with the defection to the United States of Colonel Kanatjan Alibekov, the No. 2 scientist for the program.

== Biography ==
A native of Leningrad, many members of Pasechnik's family, including his parents, perished in the Nazi siege of that city during World War II. Pasechnik studied at the Leningrad Polytechnical Institute, where he was one of the institute's brightest stars, graduating at the top of his class. Pasechnik initially specialised in the study of polymers for biological uses at the Institute of High Molecular Compounds in Leningrad; the intent was to develop new antibiotics and other treatments.

In 1974, at the age of 37, Pasechnik was invited by a general from the Soviet Ministry of Defence to start his own biotechnology institute in Leningrad and he was given "an unlimited budget" to buy equipment in the West and recruit the best staff available. The laboratory he created was in reality part of the countrywide Biopreparat program. Known as the Institute of Ultra Pure Biochemical Preparations, it was to work on the Yersinia pestis strain of the plague. The laboratory began operating in 1981, and over the next two years Pasechnik realised that, far from running a civilian research operation dedicated to vaccine development, as he had been promised, he had become part of a vast network of laboratories and factories involved in a massive biological warfare program.

According to Pasechnik, the institute, which had a staff of about 400, conducted research on modifying cruise missiles to spread the plague. The weapons system was to fly low to avoid early-warning systems and use robot craft to spray clouds of aerosolised pathogens over unsuspecting enemies. The team succeeded in producing an aerosolised version of the plague microbe that could survive outside a lab, and this version of the organism was genetically engineered to be resistant to antibiotics.

In the mid-1980s, Pasechnik became increasingly dissatisfied. ("I couldn't sleep at night, thinking about what we were doing," he would tell his British handlers.) He began to plan a defection in 1988, but had never been permitted to travel abroad. His chance came in the summer of 1989, when in recognition of past performance he was allowed to travel to Toulouse to sign the contracts of a pending deal with a French maker of chemical laboratory equipment. Rather than signing, he reported to the British embassy in Paris. Once revealed, the Soviet government insisted that Pasechnik's research had been intended to defend against acts of biological warfare by an enemy and that the program had been stopped.

In early 1993, the British government permitted Pasechnik to speak publicly. The next year, writer James Adams told Pasechnik's story in a book, The New Spies. Pasechnik lived in Shrewton, Wiltshire and worked at the UK Department of Health's Centre for Applied Microbiology & Research (CAMR) at Porton Down, near Salisbury, before forming Regma Biotechnologies, which is involved in research into tuberculosis and other drug resistant infections.

Pasechnik died of a stroke in 2001 in Salisbury, and his grave is in the churchyard of St Mary's Church, Shrewton. He was survived by his wife, Natasha, a daughter and two sons. According to one of his sons, Nikita, he was always expecting the KGB (or the later FSB) to deal with him.

== See also ==
- Soviet biological weapons program
- List of Soviet and Eastern Bloc defectors
