= Operation Harness =

Operation Harness was a series of three-month secret biological warfare trials carried out by the government of the United Kingdom in the Caribbean, off The Bahamas, in December 1948 - February 1949. Animals were exposed to anthrax, tularemia, and brucella bacteria on inflatable dinghies offshore but the results were found meaningless.

== History ==
The operation did not go well, for several reasons. The sea was rougher than expected, making it impossible for the dinghies with animal crates to be picked up by craft converted for the operation. This meant the tests were carried out just off the shore of an island, endangering inhabitants. Protective suits were found to be so heavy that those using them had to undergo a lengthy acclimatisation process to avoid heat exhaustion.

Sampling equipment was accidentally activated by local radio signals and conditions at sea made it impossible to accurately measure the amount of bacteria in the atmosphere.

500 of 600 sheep were found to be unsuitable and were shot. Guinea pigs were found to be "disastrous". 234 rhesus macaques had to be treated for pneumonia before being used.

The official report found that the techniques used were over complicated, and said that it was "uncommonly lucky" that only one of the staff was infected.
