= Poison laboratory of the Soviet secret services =

Secret research facility in the Soviet Union

- Established: 1921; 105 years ago
- Research type: Classified
- Field of research: Poisons capable of killing humans

The poison laboratory of the Soviet secret services, alternatively known as Laboratory 1, Laboratory 12, and Kamera (Russian: Камера, lit. 'The Cell (prison)'), was a covert research-and-development facility of the Soviet secret police agencies. Prior to the dissolution of the Soviet Union, the laboratory manufactured and tested poisons, and was reportedly reactivated by the Russian government in the late 1990s.

The laboratory activities were mentioned in the Mitrokhin Archive.

== Chronology ==
- 1921: First poison laboratory within the Soviet secret services was established under the name "Special Office". It was operated by the Cheka and headed by professor of medicine Ignatii Kazakov, according to Pavel Sudoplatov.
- 1926: The laboratory was under the supervision of Genrikh Yagoda, a deputy of OGPU chairman Vyacheslav Menzhinsky, who became NKVD chief in 1934 after Menzhinsky's death.
- February 20, 1939: It becomes Laboratory 1 headed by Grigory Mairanovsky. The laboratory was under the direct supervision of NKVD director Lavrenty Beria and his deputy Vsevolod Merkulov from 1939 to March 1953. Victims included the American Isaiah Oggins.
- March 14, 1953: It was renamed to Laboratory 12. V. Naumov became the newly appointed head. Lavrenty Beria and Vsevolod Merkulov were executed after Stalin's death. Immediate NKVD supervisor of the laboratory, Pavel Sudoplatov, received a long term in prison.
- 1978: Expanded into the Central Investigation Institute for Special Technology within the First Chief Directorate of the KGB.
- Since 1991: Several laboratories of the SVR (headquartered in Yasenevo near Moscow) were responsible for the "creation of biological and toxin weapons for clandestine operations in the West".

== Human experimentation ==
Mairanovsky and his colleagues tested a variety of lethal poisons on prisoners from the Gulags, including mustard gas, ricin, digitoxin, curare, cyanide, and many others. The objective of these experiments was to identify a tasteless, odorless chemical that could not be detected post mortem. Candidate poisons were administered to the victims along with a meal or drink, disguised as "medication".

Ultimately, a preparation meeting the desired criteria was developed and referred to as C-2 or K-2 (carbylamine choline chloride). According to witness testimonies, the victims experienced physical changes, such as a rapid weakening and diminishment in height, followed by a calm and silent demeanor, culminating in death within 15 minutes. Mairanovsky intentionally brought individuals of various physical conditions and ages into the laboratory to comprehensively understand the effects of each poison.

Pavel Sudoplatov and Nahum Eitingon approved specialized equipment (namely, poisons) only if it had been tested on "humans", as revealed in the testimony of Mikhail Filimonov. Vsevolod Merkulov stated that these experiments received authorization from NKVD chief Lavrentiy Beria. Following Stalin's death and Beria's subsequent arrest, Beria attested on August 28, 1953, that "I gave orders to Mairanovsky to conduct experiments on people sentenced to the highest measure of punishment, but it was not my idea".

In addition to human experimentation, Mairanovsky personally executed people with poisons, under the supervision of Sudoplatov.

== Prominent victims ==
- 1930: The leader of the Russian All-Military Union, general Alexander Kutepov, was drugged and kidnapped in Paris and died from a heart attack due to an overdose of the administered drug.
- 1936: Nestor Lakoba, Abkhaz Communist leader
- 1937: One of the leaders of the White movement and head of the Russian All-Military Union, Russian general Evgenii Miller, was drugged and kidnapped in Paris and later executed in Russia.
- 1938: Abram Slutsky (17 February 1938)
- 1940: Nikolai Koltsov, famous Russian biologist
- 1947: Cy Oggins was taken to Laboratory Number One (the "Kamera"), where Grigory Mairanovsky injected him with curare, which takes 10 to 15 minutes to kill
- 1947: Archbishop Theodore Romzha of the Ukrainian Catholic Church was killed by injection of curare provided by Mairanovsky and administered by a medical nurse who was a Ministry for State Security agent.
- 1971: Nobel prize laureate and dissident Alexander Solzhenitsyn was poisoned with what was later determined to be ricin. Solzhenitsyn survived the attempt.
- 1978: Dissident Bulgarian writer Georgi Markov was assassinated in London using a tiny pellet from an umbrella gun poisoned with ricin; the necessary equipment was prepared in this laboratory. In a Discovery Channel television program about his illustrated book of espionage equipment called The Ultimate Spy, espionage historian H. Keith Melton indicates that once the Bulgarian secret service had decided to kill Markov, KGB specialists from the Laboratory gave the Bulgarians a choice between two KGB tools that could be provided for the task: either a poisonous topical gelatin to be smeared on Markov, or an instrument to administer a poison pellet, as was eventually done.
- 1979: Attempted poisoning of the second President of Afghanistan Hafizullah Amin on December 13, 1979. Department 8 of KGB succeeded in infiltrating the illegal agent Mutalin Talybov (codenamed SABIR) as a chef of Amin's presidential palace. Some food intended for Amin and those close to him was successfully poisoned. Amin survived, but his son-in-law was flown to Moscow to be treated for acute food poisoning. An intelligence officer said of Amin that he "kept switching his food and drink as if he expected to be poisoned".

== Alleged victims ==
- Russian writer Maxim Gorky and his son Max Peshkov. During the Trial of the Twenty-One in 1938, NKVD chief Genrikh Yagoda admitted that he poisoned Gorky and his son and unsuccessfully tried to poison his own deputy (and eventual successor) Nikolai Yezhov. The attempted poisoning of Yezhov was later officially dismissed as falsification, but Vyacheslav Molotov believed that the poisoning accusations were true. Yagoda was never officially rehabilitated (recognized as an innocent victim of political repressions) by Soviet authorities.
- Soviet leader Joseph Stalin. Russian historians Anton Antonov-Ovseenko and Edvard Radzinsky believe that Stalin was poisoned by associates of NKVD chief Lavrentiy Beria, based on the interviews of a former Stalin bodyguard and numerous pieces of circumstantial evidence. Stalin planned to dismiss and execute Molotov and other senior members of the Soviet regime in 1953. According to Radzinsky, Stalin was poisoned by Khrustalev, a senior bodyguard briefly mentioned in the memoirs of Svetlana Alliluyeva, Stalin's daughter.
- Georgi Dimitrov, the first Communist leader of Bulgaria, abruptly fell ill in 1949 and died in a Moscow hospital. According to some historians, Dimitrov was poisoned by the Soviet authorities on the orders of Stalin, due in part to his support for the proposed Balkan Federation.
- Nikolai Khokhlov, a KGB defector who survived a thallium poisoning attempt in Frankfurt in 1957.

Alleged FSB victims

- Lechi Ismailov, a Chechen rebel commander sentenced in Russia for nine years in prison died in September 2002 after an unsuccessful attempt to recruit him as an informer by FSB. Shortly after being transferred from the Lefortovo prison to a regular prison, he had a "farewell" cup of tea with the FSB officer after which fell fatally ill, lost his hair and died shortly after.
- Roman Tsepov, a Russian businessman close to Vladimir Putin and Tambov Gang circles.
- Amir Khattab, who was poisoned by a "a fast-acting nerve agent, possibly sarin or a derivative" transferred on a letter delivered by an FSB-recruited courier.
- Yuri Shchekochikhin, a Russian journalist for the newspaper Novaya Gazeta, Shchekochikhin investigated apartment bombings allegedly directed by the Russian secret services and the Three Whales Corruption Scandal which involved high-ranking FSB. Shchekochikhin died from a fast and mysterious disease shortly before his departure to the US to testify before FBI investigators. His medical documentation was classified as "state secret" by Russian authorities.
- Journalist Anna Politkovskaya. During the Beslan school hostage crisis in September 2004 and while on her way to Beslan to help in negotiations with the hostage-takers, Politkovskaya fell violently ill and lost consciousness after drinking tea given to her by an Aeroflot flight attendant. She survived. The drug was allegedly prepared in the FSB poison facility. Politkovskaya was later shot to death in her Moscow apartment building in 2006.
- Former KGB agent Alexander Litvinenko. He was poisoned in a sushi bar in London in 2006. Traces of polonium-210 were found in his body. In a farewell letter, Litvinenko accused President Vladimir Putin of being behind the attack on his life. Litvinenko was critical of the Putin regime and accused the FSB of being behind the 1999 attacks in Russia. He died on 23 November 2006.
- Viktor Kalashnikov, a freelance journalist and former KGB colonel, and his wife Marina Kalashnikova. In December 2010, the Charité hospital in Berlin discovered that they had been poisoned with mercury. Viktor Kalashnikov claimed it was the work of the FSB.
- Karinna Moskalenko, a human rights lawyer who defended Litvinenko and other anti-Putin dissidents in court. She fell ill from mercury poisoning in October 2008, just prior to a hearing regarding the assassination of Anna Politkovskaya. Although initially alleged to be an attempt on her life, it was found by French police to be the result of a barometer broken in the car by the previous owner.
- Viktor Yushchenko, the third President of Ukraine. Yushchenko was found to have been poisoned with TCDD dioxin during the 2004 Ukrainian presidential election campaign. In 2009, he accused Russia of shielding a number of witnesses to his poisoning, and called on the Russian government to turn them over.
- Pyotr Verzilov, spokesman for the protest band Pussy Riot. Verzilov was admitted to a hospital in Moscow in September 2018, before being transferred to the Charité in Berlin. The German doctors believed it was "highly probable" that Verzilov was poisoned.
- Vladimir Kara-Murza, opposition politician. Kara-Murza suddenly fell ill during a meeting in Moscow in May 2015, and was in a coma for more than a month. Coming on the heels of the assassination of Boris Nemtsov in Moscow that February, his family suspected he had been poisoned. Kara-Murza was hospitalized again for an alleged poisoning in February 2017.
- Sergei Skripal, former GRU officer and double agent for the British SIS, and his daughter Yulia. On 4 March 2018, the Skripals were poisoned with a Novichok agent in Salisbury, United Kingdom, where Sergei had been living since 2010. Both eventually recovered; in 2020, they were reported to be living under new identities in New Zealand.
- Emilian Gebrev, Bulgarian arms dealer. Gebrev, his son, and one of his business partners were allegedly poisoned in April 2015. British investigators traveled to Bulgaria in 2019 to investigate an alleged connection between Gebrev's poisoning and that of the Skripals in England in 2018.
- Alexei Navalny, anti-corruption advocate and opposition leader. Navalny fell ill on a flight from Tomsk to Moscow on 20 August 2020, and was placed into an induced coma at a hospital in Omsk. He was transferred to the Charité in Berlin two days later. Five laboratories certified by the Organisation for the Prohibition of Chemical Weapons confirmed the presence of a new type of Novichok agent. Navalny later died in prison in 2024, also suspected to be the result of poisoning.

== Planned victims ==
- President of the Socialist Federal Republic of Yugoslavia Josip Broz Tito. In the late 1940s, the laboratory manufactured a powdered plague for use in a small container and where the assassin was vaccinated against plague. The device was to be used against Tito, but MGB agent Iosif Grigulevich, who had previously organized the assault on the villa of Leon Trotsky and now received the assignment to kill Tito, was recalled after the death of Joseph Stalin.

FSB era

- The first democratically elected President of the Republic of Georgia, Zviad Gamsakhurdia. According to former Deputy Director of Biopreparat Ken Alibek, this laboratory was possibly involved in the design of an undetectable chemical or biological agent to assassinate Gamsakhurdia. BBC News reported that some Gamsakhurdia friends believed he committed suicide, "although his widow insists that he was murdered."

== Threatened dissidents ==
The New York Times reported that Garry Kasparov, the chess champion and Putin opponent, drinks bottled water and eats prepared meals carried by his bodyguards.

== See also ==
- Active measures
- Biopreparat
- List of poisonings
- Nazi human experimentation
- North Korean human experimentation
- Project MKULTRA
- Unethical human experimentation in the United States
- Unit 731 (Japan)
- United States chemical weapons program

== Sources ==
- PETLIURA, KONOVALETS, BANDERA - Three Leaders of Ukrainian Liberation Movement murdered by the Order of Moscow. Ukrainian Publishers Limited. 237, Liverpool Road, London, United Kingdom. 1962. (audiobook).
- Ken Alibek and S. Handelman. Biohazard: The Chilling True Story of the Largest Covert Biological Weapons Program in the World - Told from Inside by the Man Who Ran it. 1999. Delta (2000) ISBN 0-385-33496-6
- Vadim J. Birstein. The Perversion Of Knowledge: The True Story of Soviet Science. Westview Press (2004) ISBN 0-8133-4280-5.
- Vasili Mitrokhin and Christopher Andrew, The World Was Going Our Way: The KGB and the Battle for the Third World, Basic Books (2005) hardcover, 677 pages ISBN 0-465-00311-7
- The Laboratory 12 poison plot, by Martin Sixsmith, The Sunday Times, April 8, 2007
- The KGB's Poison Factory, by Boris Volodarsky, Wall Street Journal, 7 April 2005
- History of Soviet poisonings (Russian) by Boris Sokolov grani.ru
- Organic poison (Russian) by Vladimir Abarinov, grani.ru
- Boris Volodarsky, The KGB’s Poison Factory: From Lenin to Litvinenko (London: Frontline Books, 2009) ISBN 1-84832-542-8
- Boris Volodarsky, Assassins: The KGB's Poison Factory 10 Years On (London: Frontline Books, 2019) ISBN 978-1-52673-392-4
