= Muhametzhan Tuimebayev =

Muhametzhan Tuimebayev Мұхаметжан Түймебаев
- Village
- Location in Kazakhstan
- Coordinates: 45°24′36″N 76°54′47″E
- Country: Kazakhstan
- Region: Almaty Region
- District: Ile District

Population (2009)
  - Total: 10,312
- Time zone: UTC+6 (Omsk Time)
- Postal code: 040702
- Area code: 72752

Muhametzhan Tuimebayev (Kazakh: Мұхаметжан Түймебаев, Mūhametjan Tüimebaev), formerly Ashchybulak (Kazakh: Ащыбұлақ, Aşybūlaq), is a village in the Almaty Region of south-eastern Kazakhstan.
