= Ken Alibek =

Kazakh-American physician, microbiologist, and biological warfare expert

- Қанатжан Әлібеков
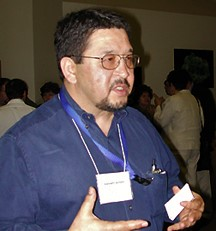
- Alibek in 2003
- Born: Қанатжан Байзақұлы Әлібеков; Kanatzhan "Kanat" Alibekov; 1950 (age 75–76); Kauchuk, Kazakh Soviet Socialist Republic, Soviet Union
- Education: Tomsk Medical Institute
- Occupations: Microbiologist, doctor (oncologist) and bioweaponeer
- Years active: 1975–1991
- Era: Cold War
- Known for: Creating the most virulent strain of anthrax ever synthesized
- Children: 5
- Military career
- Allegiance: Soviet Union
- Service: Soviet Army
- Service years: 1975–1991
- Rank: Colonel
- Commands: Biopreparat

Kanatzhan "Kanat" Baizakovich Alibekov (born 1950), known as Kenneth "Ken" Alibek since 1992, is a Kazakh-American microbiologist, bioweaponeer, and biological warfare administrative management expert. He was the first deputy director of Biopreparat.

During his career in Soviet bioweaponry development in the late 1970s and 1980s, Alibekov managed projects that included weaponizing glanders and Marburg hemorrhagic fever, and created Russia's first tularemia bomb. His most prominent accomplishment was the creation of a new "battle strain" of anthrax, known as "Strain 836", later described by the Los Angeles Times as "the most virulent and vicious strain of anthrax known to man".

In 1992, he immigrated to the United States; he has since become an American citizen and made his living as a biodefense consultant, speaker, and entrepreneur. He had actively participated in the development of biodefense strategy for the U.S. government, and between 1998 and 2005 he testified several times before the U.S. Congress and other governments on biotechnology issues, saying he was “convinced that Russia’s biological weapons program has not been completely dismantled”. In 1994, Alibek received a congressional award, a bronze Barkley medal awarded in recognition of distinguished public service and his contribution to world peace.

In 2002, Alibek told United Press International that there is concern that monkeypox could be engineered into a biological weapon.

Ohio-based Locus Fermentation Solutions hired Alibek in 2015 as executive vice president for research and development of biologically active molecules for different applications.

== Early life and education ==
Alibek was born Kanat Alibekov in Kauchuk, in the Kazakh SSR of the Soviet Union (present-day Kazakhstan), to a Kazakh family. He grew up in Almaty, the republic's former capital. He is a certified oncologist, a doctor of science, doctor of philosophy and a doctor of medicine.

== Career ==
Alibek's academic performance while studying military medicine at the Tomsk Medical Institute and his family's noted patriotism led to his selection to work for Biopreparat, the secret biological weapons program overseen by the Soviet Union's Council of Ministers. His first assignment in 1975 was to the Eastern European Branch of the Institute of Applied Biochemistry (IAB) near Omutninsk, a combined pesticide production facility and reserve biological weapons production plant intended for activation in a time of war. At Omutninsk, Alibek formulated and evaluated various nutrient media and cultivation conditions for the optimization of microbial growth. While there, he expanded his medical school laboratory skills into the complex skill set required for industrial-level production of microorganisms and their toxins.

After a year at Omutninsk, Alibek was transferred to the Siberian Branch of the IAB near Berdsk (another name of the branch was the Berdsk scientific and production base). With the assistance of a colleague, he designed and constructed a microbiology research and development laboratory that worked on techniques to optimize the production of biological formulations.

After several promotions, Alibek was transferred back to Omutninsk, where he rose to the position of deputy director. He was soon transferred to the Kazakhstan Scientific and Production Base in Stepnogorsk (another reserve BW facility) to become the new director of that facility. Officially, he was deputy director of the Progress Scientific and Production Association, a manufacturer of fertilizer and pesticide.

At Stepnogorsk, Alibek created an efficient industrial scale assembly line for biological formulations. In a time of war, the assembly line could be used to produce weaponized anthrax. Continued successes in science and biotechnology led to more promotions, which resulted in a transfer to Moscow.

=== Biopreparat ===
In Moscow, Alibek began his service as deputy chief of the biosafety directorate at Biopreparat. He was promoted in 1988 to first deputy director of Biopreparat, where he not only oversaw the biological weapons facilities but also the significant number of pharmaceutical facilities that produced antibiotics, vaccines, sera, and interferon for the public.

In response to a Spring 1990 announcement that the Ministry of Medical and Microbiological Industry was to be reorganized, Alibek drafted and forwarded a memo to then General Secretary Mikhail Gorbachev proposing the cessation of Biopreparat's biological weapons work. Gorbachev approved the proposal, but an additional paragraph was secretly inserted into Alibek's draft, resulting in a presidential decree that ordered the end of Biopreparat's biological weapons work but also required them to remain prepared for future bioweapons production.

Alibek used his position at Biopreparat and the authority granted to him by the first part of the decree to begin the destruction of the biological weapons to dismantle biological weapons production and testing capabilities at a number of research and development facilities, including Stepnogorsk, Kol'tsovo, Obolensk, and others. He also negotiated a concurrent appointment to a Biopreparat facility called Biomash. Biomash designed and produced technical equipment for microbial cultivation and testing. He planned to increase the proportion of its products sent to hospitals and civilian medical laboratories beyond the 40% allocated at the time.

Following the dissolution of the Soviet Union in December 1991, Alibek was subsequently placed in charge of intensive preparations for inspections of Soviet biological facilities by a joint American and British delegation. But when he participated in the subsequent Soviet inspection of American facilities, his suspicion that the U.S. did not have an offensive bioweapons program was confirmed before his return to Russia. In January 1992, not long after his return from the U.S., Alibek protested against Russia's continuation of bioweapons work and resigned from both the Russian Army and Biopreparat.

=== Immigration to the United States ===
In October 1992, Alibek and his family emigrated to the United States. After moving to the U.S., Alibekov provided the government with a detailed accounting of the former Soviet biological weapons program. During a CIA debriefing, Alibek described the Soviet efforts to weaponize a particularly virulent smallpox strain, producing hundreds of tons of the virus that could be disseminated with bombs or ballistic missiles. Information about the Soviet biological weapons program had already been provided in 1989 by the defected scientist Vladimir Pasechnik.

Alibekov has testified before the U.S. Congress several times and has provided guidance to U.S. intelligence, policy, national security, and medical communities.

He was the impetus behind the creation of a biodefense graduate program at the Schar School of Policy and Government at George Mason University, serving as Distinguished Professor of Medical Microbiology and the program's Director of Education. He also developed the plans for the university's biosafety level three (BSL-3) research facility and secured $40 million of grants from the federal and state governments for its construction.

From 1993 to 1999, Alibek took on multiple R&D roles, including a visiting scientist at the National Institute of Health, researching novel antigenic, potentially immunogenic substances for the development of tuberculosis vaccine; project manager at SRS Technologies where he researched, analyzed and developed detailed synthesis reports regarding the biotechnological of foreign countries; and program manager at Battelle Memorial Institute overseeing research projects in medical biotechnology, biosynthesis and fermentation equipment.

In 1999, Alibek published an autobiographical account of his work in the Soviet Union and his defection.

Reporting the prospect of Iraq gaining the ability to get hold of smallpox or anthrax, Alibek said, "there is no doubt that Saddam Hussein has weapons of mass destruction." However, no biological weapons were later found in Iraq.

=== Entrepreneur and research administrator ===
Alibek was president, chief scientific officer, and chief executive officer at AFG Biosolutions, Inc in Gaithersburg, Maryland, where he and his scientific team continued their development of advanced solutions for antimicrobial immunity. Motivated by the lack of affordable anti-cancer therapies available in Eastern Europe and Central Asia, AFG was using Alibek's biotechnology experience to plan, build, and manage a new pharmaceutical production facility designed specifically to address this problem.

Alibek created a new pharmaceutical production company, MaxWell Biocorporation (MWB), in 2006 and served as its chief executive officer and president. Based in Washington, D.C., with several subsidiaries and affiliates in the U.S. and Ukraine, MWB's main stated goal is create a new, large-scale, high-technology, ultra-modern pharmaceutical fill-and-finish facility in Ukraine. Off-patent generic pharmaceuticals produced at this site are intended to target severe oncological, cardiological, immunological, and chronic infectious diseases.

Construction of the Boryspil facility began in April 2007 and was completed in March 2008; initial production was scheduled to begin in 2008. The stated intention was that high-quality pharmaceuticals would be produced and become an affordable source of therapy for millions of underprivileged who currently have no therapeutic options. Abilek stepped down as President of MWB in the summer of 2008 shortly after the facility opened.

Alibek's main research focus was developing novel forms of therapy for late-stage oncological diseases and other chronic degenerative pathologies and disorders. He focuses on the role of chronic viral and bacterial infections in causing age-related diseases and premature aging. Additionally, he develops and implements novel systemic immunotherapy methods for late-stage cancer patients.

Throughout his career, Alibek has published nine research articles on the role of infectious diseases in cancer.

=== Work in Kazakhstan ===
In 2010, Alibek was invited to begin working in Kazakhstan as a head of the Department of Chemistry and Biology at the School of Science and Technology of Nazarbayev University in Astana, where he was engaged in the development of anti-cancer drugs and life-prolonging drugs, and was chairman of the board of the Republican Scientific Center for Emergency Medical Care and headed the National Scientific Center for Oncology and Transplantation. During his stay, he published a number of articles in research journals and taught various courses in various fields of biology and medicine. He focused on a possible role of chronic infections, metabolic disorders, and immunosuppression on cancer development. In 2011, he was awarded a prize from the Deputy Prime Minister for his contribution to the development of the educational system in Kazakhstan. In 2014, he was awarded a medal by the Minister of Education and Science of Kazakhstan for his contribution to research in Kazakhstan. He continues his work as an administrative manager of a research and medicine and education professor.

However, after seven years, no significant scientific results from Alibek's work developed. During these seven years, Alibek received more than 1 billion Tenge from the budget for "New Systemic Therapy for Cancer Tumors" project he tried to implement. The promising Swedish technique has remained a common concept, a panacea for cancer treatment has not appeared. Three submitted Alibekov patent applications for registration were rejected by the National Institute of Intellectual Property of the Ministry of Justice of the Republic of Kazakhstan since there was no novelty.

In 2016, Alibek was chosen as one of the nominees in the "Science" category of the national project El Tulgasy, which was designed to select the most significant citizens of Kazakhstan who are associated with national achievements. More than 350,000 people voted in this project, and Alibek was voted 10th place in his category.

=== COVID-19 ===
Alibek has experience in vaccine development for pandemics. In 2006, his article on new principles for developing these vaccines was published in Future Medicine.

In January 2020, Alibek issued a warning about COVID-19 and its potential as a global problem. His research on safe methods of protection against the virus ahead of a vaccine was later published in the journal Research Ideas and Outcomes (RIO). He also wrote two chapters on methods to protect against the COVID-19 pandemic in the book Defending Against Biothreats: What We Can Learn from the Coronavirus Pandemic to Enhance U.S. Defenses Against Pandemics and Biological Weapons.

In 2021, Alibek offered a free seminar on the antiviral biodefence in the world of epidemic uncertainties.

=== Autism research ===
Starting in 2007, Alibek began researching autism based on his background as a board-certified oncologist and his own personal connection to the disorder through his daughter, Mary. He supports the idea that the disorder is the result of prenatal viral and bacterial infections. Multiple studies have been conducted with patients that have autism spectrum disorder, including a 2018-2019 study with 57 patients, a 2021-2023 study with 142 patients and a 2023 study with 32 patients. In addition, more than 1,000 children have been treated using the protocol. His patients are located predominantly in nations in the former Soviet Union and Ukraine, and he consults mainly using free telemedicine services. During these studies, specific inflammation markers along with biochemical and neuropsychiatric parameters were identified as an objective measure of improvement in and a reduction of symptoms. Alibek has published 6 studies in peer-reviewed journals about the causes and treatment of Autism, and has one issued U.S. patent and three U.S. patent filings on his novel approach to treatment.

== Criticism ==
In a September 2003 news release, Alibek and another professor suggested, based on their laboratory research, that the smallpox vaccination might increase a person's resistance to HIV. The work was rejected after peer review by the Journal of the American Medical Association and The Lancet and is no longer being pursued. According to smallpox expert and former White House science advisor Donald Henderson, "This is a theory that... does not hold up at all, and it does not make any sense from a biologic point of view...This idea...was straight off the wall. I would put no credence in it at all." In 2010, an article coauthored by Alibek appeared in Biomed Central - Immunology, a scientific journal, that outlined the results of their research showing that prior immunization with the vaccine Dryvax may confer resistance to HIV replication.

Alibek also has promoted "Dr. Ken Alibek's Immune System Support Formula," a dietary supplement sold over the Internet. It contains vitamins, minerals, and a proprietary bacterial mix that will purportedly "bolster the immune system".

== Personal life ==
Alibek has a wife and five children (two sons and three daughters); one of his daughters is autistic.

== Publications ==
Books

- Alibek, Ken and Steven Handelman (1999), Biohazard: The Chilling True Story of the Largest Covert Biological Weapons Program in the World – Told from Inside by the Man Who Ran It, Random House, ISBN 0-385-33496-6.
- "The Anthrax Vaccine: Is It safe? Does it Work?" (2002), Reviewer. National Academy Press, Washington, D.C., Institute of Medicine.
- Biological Threats and Terrorism: Assessing the Science and Response Capabilities (2002), Workshop Summary, Contributor. National Academy Press, Washington, D.C., Institute of Medicine.
- Weinstein, R.S. and K. Alibek (2003), Biological and Chemical Terrorism: A Guide for Healthcare Providers and First Responders, Thieme Medical Publishing, New York.
- Alibek, K., et al. (2003), Biological Weapons, Bio-Prep, Louisiana.
- Fong, I. and K. Alibek (2005), Bioterrorism and Infectious Agents: A New Dilemma for the 21st Century, Springer.
- Fong, I. and K. Alibek (2006), New and Evolving Infections of the 21st Century, Springer.
- Fleitz, Alibek, Bryen, Rosett, Chang, DeSutter, Elliott, Faddis, Geraghty, Gibson (2020), Defending Against Biothreats: What We Can Learn from the Coronavirus Pandemic to Enhance U.S. Defenses Against Pandemics and Biological Weapons

Book chapters

- "Firepower in the Lab: Automation in the Fight Against Infectious Diseases and Bioterrorism" (2001), Chapter 15 of Biological Weapons: Past, Present, and Future, National Academy Press, Washington, D.C., Institute of Medicine.
- Jane's Chem-Bio Handbook (2002), Second Edition, F. R. Sidell, W. C. Patrick, T. R. Dashiell, K. Alibek, Jane's Information Group, Alexandria, VA.
- K. Alibek, C. Lobanova, "Modulation of Innate Immunity to Protect Against Biological Weapon Threat" (2006). In: Microorganisms and Bioterrorism, Springer.

Op-Eds

- The New York Times
  - "Russia's Deadly Expertise", March 27, 1998.
  - "Smallpox Could Still Be a Danger", May 24, 1999.
- The Wall Street Journal
  - "Russia Retains Biological Weapons Capability", February, 2000.
  - "Bioterror: A Very Real Threat", October, 2001.
- The Washington Post
  - "Anthrax under the Microscope", with Matthew Meselson, November 5, 2002.

Selected Congressional Testimony

- Testimony before the Joint Economic Committee, May 1998: "Terrorist and Intelligence Operations: Potential Impact on the US Economy"
- Testimony before the Senate Select Committee on Intelligence, June, 1999
- Testimony before the House Armed Services Committee, October, 1999
- Testimony before the House Armed Services Committee, May, 2000
- Testimony before the House Subcommittee on National Security, Veterans Affairs, and International Relations of the Committee on Government Reform, October 12, 2001: "Combating Terrorism: Assessing the Threat of a Biological Weapons Attack", House Serial No. 107-103
- Testimony before the House Committee on International Relations, December, 2001: "Russia, Iraq, and Other Potential Sources of Anthrax, Smallpox, and Other Bioterrorist Weapons"
- Testimony before the Senate Subcommittee on Departments of Labor, Health and Human Services, Education, and Related Agencies of the Committee on Appropriations, November, 2001
- Testimony before the Subcommittee on Prevention of Nuclear and Biological Attack, Committee on Homeland Security, US House of Representatives, July 28, 2005: "Implementing a National Biodefense Strategy"
- House Permanent Select Committee on Intelligence, March 1999 Biological Warfare Threats
- Testimony before the House Subcommittee on Prevention of Nuclear and Biological Attack, July 13, 2005: "Engineering Bio-terror Agents: Lessons Learned from the Offensive US and Russian Biological Weapons Programs"

Awards, Presentations and Distinctions

- 2014 Kazakhstan Government's Prime Minister Award “For Distinguished Contribution to Science”
- 2011 Kazakhstan Government's Vice Prime Minister Award “For the Development of Kazakhstan Education System”
- 2007 “Panacea Award” for Innovations in Medical and Pharmaceutical Industries, Kyiv (Ukraine)
- 2005 Lecturer for on a “Russian-American Security Program of Harvard University’s John Kennedy Center for Government Studies
- 2005 Senior Fellow, Center for Advanced Defense Studies, Washington DC
- 2004 Outstanding Faculty Member Award, George Mason University
- 2002 Business Forward Magazine Award: “Deals of the Year” for One of the Largest Federal Research Contracts for Small Businesses
- 2000 (Davos, Switzerland), 2002 (New York) Invited speaker to the World Economic Forum
- 1994 Congressional Award: Bronze medal named after Albane W. Barkley - Awarded by the U.S. Government in Recognition of Distinguished Public Service
- 1989 A Colonel of Medical Services, awarded by the USSR's Minister of Defense
- 1983 Medal “For Combat Merits” by the USSR's Minister of Defense
