= Vlasikha =

Vlasikha (Russian: Власиха) is the name of several inhabited localities in Russia.

== Urban localities ==
- Vlasikha, Moscow Oblast, a closed work settlement in Moscow Oblast

== Rural localities ==
- Vlasikha (station), Altai Krai, a station in Vlasikhinskaya Settlement Administration of Industrialny City District of the city of krai significance of Barnaul, Altai Krai
- Vlasikha (selo), Altai Krai, a selo in Vlasikhinskaya Settlement Administration of Industrialny City District of the city of krai significance of Barnaul, Altai Krai
- Vlasikha, Kostroma Oblast, a village in Ivanovskoye Settlement of Sharyinsky District of Kostroma Oblast
- Vlasikha, Novgorod Oblast, a village in Peredskoye Settlement of Borovichsky District of Novgorod Oblast
- Vlasikha, Molokovsky District, Tver Oblast, a village in Molokovsky District of Tver Oblast
- Vlasikha, Rameshkovsky District, Tver Oblast, a village in Rameshkovsky District of Tver Oblast
- Vlasikha, Yaroslavl Oblast, a village in Rozhalovsky Rural Okrug of Nekouzsky District of Yaroslavl Oblast
