= Yuri Ovchinnikov (biochemist) =

Soviet chemist (1934–1988)

- Овчинников, Юрий Анатольевич
- Yu. A. Ovchinnikov (1934–88)
- Born: August 2, 1934; Moscow, Russian Republic in Soviet Union (Present-day in Moscow in Russian Federation.)
- Died: February 17, 1988 (aged 53); Moscow in Soviet Union
- Education: Moscow State University
- Known for: Soviet Program of Biological Weapons; Research on rhodopsin, cybernetics, and structural biology
- Awards: Hero of Socialist Labour
- Scientific career
- Fields: Chemistry (Biochemistry)
- Workplaces: Biopreparat; Moscow State University; Soviet Academy of Sciences

Yuri Anatolyevich Ovchinnikov (Russian: Овчинников, Юрий Анатольевич; 2 August 1934 – 17 February 1988) was a Soviet chemist who contributed to bioorganic chemistry and biochemistry. He was elected in 1970 as a full member of the USSR Academy of Sciences and subsequently became the youngest vice president of the academy in its history (1974-1988). He was elected to the American Philosophical Society in 1977. He was also president of the Federation of European Biochemical Societies (1984-1986), Director of the Institute of Bioorganic Chemistry in Moscow (1970-1988) and professor at Moscow State University. From 1972 through to 1984 he served concomitantly as head of the Laboratory of Protein Chemistry at the USSR Academy of Sciences' Institute of Protein (Pushchino, Moscow oblast).

Ovchinnikov's political career mirrored his achievements within the USSR Academy of Sciences. It is highly unlikely that he would have advanced so far, so quickly, in the scientific arena without the full and enthusiastic engagement of the Soviet political system. He joined the Communist Party of the Soviet Union (CPSU) in 1962 and was then elected in March 1981 as a candidate member of the CPSU Central Committee. This made him one of the youngest persons ever to take this first step toward full, voting membership in the Soviet policy-making group. He served as a member of the Central Auditing Commission of the CPSU from 1976 to 1980. From 1975 to 1988 he was a member of the Presidium of the Higher Attestation Commission of the USSR Council of Ministers. He attended the XXV, VVVI and XXVII Congresses of the CPSU as a delegate in 1976, 1981 and 1986 respectively.

He was a leading proponent of using molecular biology and genetics for creating new types of biological weapons. It was in this latter context that Ovchinnikov was appointed to the highly secret Interdepartmental Scientific-Technical Council on Molecular Biology and Genetics - known also by the coded designation P.O. Box A-3092. The council was the nerve centre of the Soviet biological weapons programme. By stressing the potential military applications of the newly emerging techniques of molecular biology, Ovchinnikov was able to extract substantial resources for his research endeavours in the biological sciences. In 1984, for example, he was able to secure reported US$300 million funding from the Soviet government for the construction of palatial new quarters for his institute which consisted of thirteen interconnected seven-storey buildings which from above described a huge DNA double helix. Occupying an area of 85,000 square metres it was generously equipped and had an annual budget of a reported 100 million roubles.

He contributed to the field of biophysics and biochemistry through research in rhodopsin and structural biology.
