= Omutninsk =

Town in Kirov Oblast, Russia

Omutninsk Омутнинск
- Town
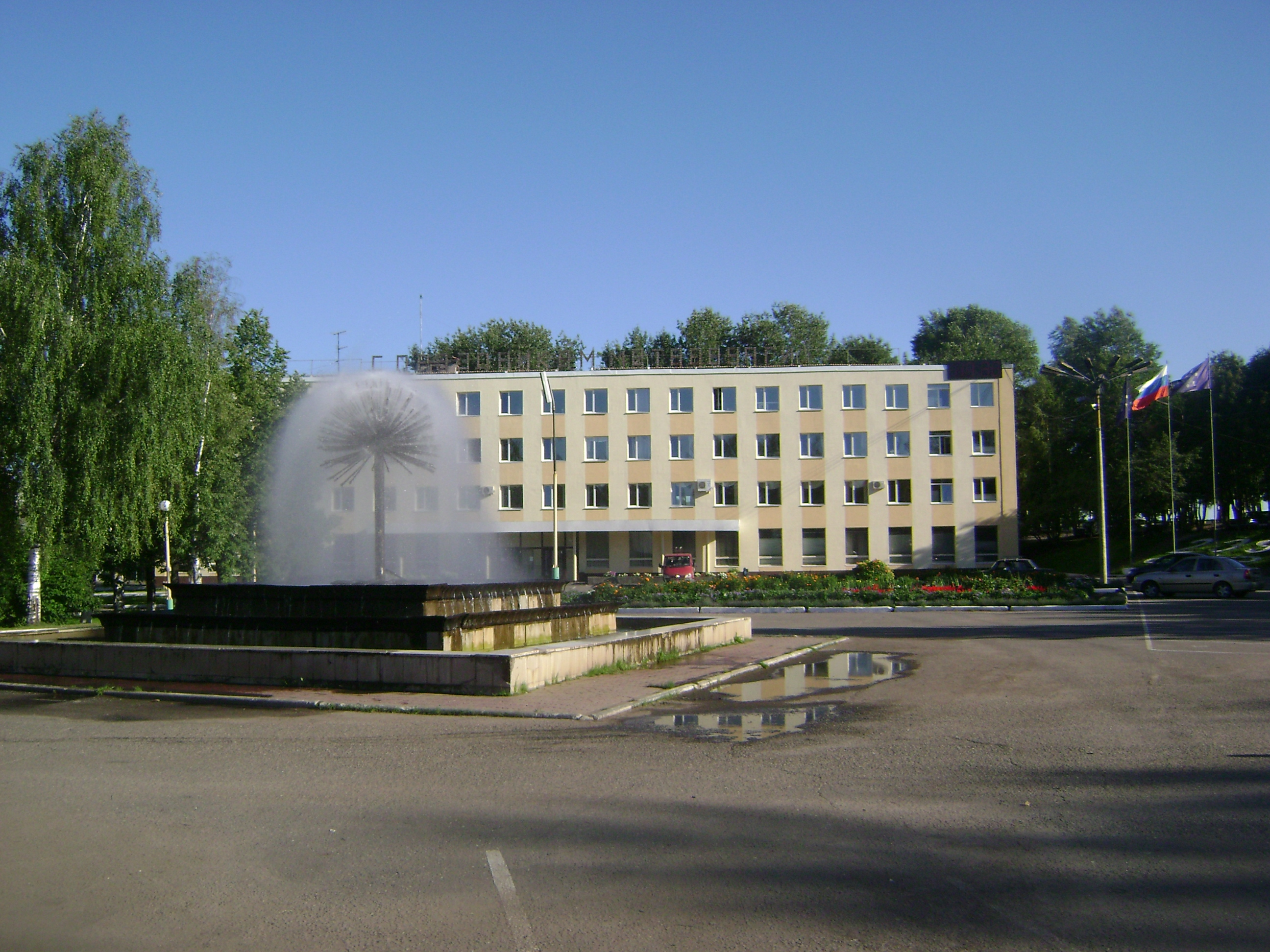
- View of Omutninsk

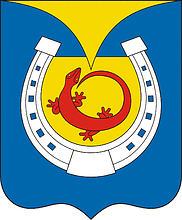
- Coat of arms
- Interactive map of Omutninsk
- Location of Omutninsk Omutninsk (Kirov Oblast)
- Coordinates: 58°40′N 52°11′E
- Country: Russia
- Federal subject: Kirov Oblast
- Administrative district: Omutninsky District
- TownSelsoviet: Omutninsk
- First mentioned: 1773
- Town status since: 1921
- Elevation: 210 m (690 ft)

Population
  - Estimate (2021): 19,629 )

Administrative status
  - Capital of: Omutninsky District, Town of Omutninsk

Municipal status
  - Municipal district: Omutninsky Municipal District
  - Urban settlement: Omutninskoye Urban Settlement
  - Capital of: Omutninsky Municipal District, Omutninskoye Urban Settlement
- Time zone: UTC+3 (MSK)
- Postal codes: 612740–612744, 612749
- OKTMO ID: 33628101001
- Website: omutninsk-adm.ru

Omutninsk (Russian: Омутни́нск) is a town and the administrative center of Omutninsky District in Kirov Oblast, Russia. Population: 19,629 (2021 census); 23,615 (2010 census); 26,065 (2002 census); 29,248 (1989 Soviet census).

== History ==
It was first mentioned in 1773; town status was granted to it in 1921.

== Administrative and municipal status ==
Within the framework of administrative divisions, Omutninsk serves as the administrative center of Omutninsky District. As an administrative division, it is, together with four rural localities, incorporated within Omutninsky District as the Town of Omutninsk. As a municipal division, the Town of Omutninsk is incorporated within Omutninsky Municipal District as Omutninskoye Urban Settlement.

== Research ==
The Institute of Applied Biochemistry is situated near Omutninsk. According to Dr. Ken Alibek, a biological warfare expert, it was (and possibly still is) a combined pesticide production facility and reserve biological weapons production plant that could be activated in time of war.
