= Biopreparat =

Soviet biological warfare agency

The All-Union Science Production Association Biopreparat (Russian: Биопрепарат, [bʲɪəprʲɪpɐˈrat], lit. 'bio-medication') was a Soviet agency created in April 1974, which spearheaded the largest and most sophisticated offensive biological warfare program known. It was a vast, ostensibly civilian, network employing 30–40,000 personnel and incorporating five major military-focused research institutes, numerous design and instrument-making facilities, three pilot plants and five dual-use production plants. The network pursued major offensive research and development programs with genetically engineered microbial strains to be resistant to an array of antibiotics. In addition, bacterial agents were created with the ability to produce various peptides, yielding strains with wholly new and unexpected pathogenic properties.

== History ==
=== Origins ===
The origins of the Biopreparat network are closely connected with the creation in the 1950s, under the leadership of Nikita Khrushchev, of biological warfare mobilisation facilities hidden within newly built civil production plants. The construction of the first major dual-use plant, the Berdsk Chemical Factory, located 26 km south of Novosibirsk, began in 1957 in response to a decree by the USSR Council of Ministers on the development of the Soviet chemical and microbiological industry. A second dual-use facility, the Omutninsk Chemical Factory, located in Vostochnyi, 150 km north-east of Kirov, was created in accordance with a decree issued on the 2 August 1958 by the CPSU and the Council of Ministers. The idea behind the new plants was that in the event of wartime emergency they could switch from the output of civil microbiological products to the production of military biological agents. Both the Berdsk and the Omutninsk facilities were transferred to Biopreparat upon its creation in 1974.

Another key institution which Biopreparat was to draw heavily upon for the recruitment of scientific personnel with knowledge of biological weapons was the Scientific-Research Technical Bureau (Nauchno-issledovatel'skoe tekhnicheskoe byuro or NITB). It was created in August 1958 under the USSR Ministry of Defence's Fifteenth Administration, which at this time managed the Soviet Union's BW programme. NITB had the task of developing technology for use in the creation of dual-use pharmaceutical and microbiological enterprises. It also had the responsibility of maintaining the military components of the Soviet dual-use facilities in a constant state of readiness. Most of the key staff members at NITB were transferred to Biopreparat in 1974.

=== Establishment ===
On the 24 April 1974, the USSR's Main Administration of the Microbiological Industry (Glavmikrobioprom) issued Order 131 DSP which created the All-Union Science Production Association Biopreparat. On the 26 June 1974, a number of the Soviet Union's existing dual-use BW facilities were transferred to the new agency. These included the Berdsk Chemical Factory and the Omutninsk Chemical Factory. The Biopreparat project was reportedly initiated by academician Yuri Anatol'evich Ovchinnikov, who convinced General Secretary Leonid Brezhnev that development of biological weapons was necessary. The research at Biopreparat constituted a violation of the terms of the Biological Weapons Convention of 1972, which outlawed biological weapons.

=== Exposure in the West ===
Biopreparat's research and development (R&D) programmes were from the very outset subject to extraordinary levels of secrecy and compartmentalization. The first significant intelligence reaching the West regarding the nature and extent of this Soviet covert BW effort resulted from the defection to the UK in October 1989 of a high-level Biopreparat scientist, Vladimir Artemovich Pasechnik (1937–2001). The latter was able to provide a detailed account of the vast scope of Moscow's clandestine program. As a result of Pasechnik's testimony, British Prime Minister Margaret Thatcher and US President George H. W. Bush were able to apply pressure on Soviet President Mikhail Gorbachev to open up Russia's germ warfare facilities to a team of outside inspectors. When the inspectors toured four of the sites in 1991, they were met with denials and evasions. Production tanks, the purpose of which seemed to be to manufacture large quantities of hazardous materials, were clean and sterile when presented to inspectors. Laboratories had been stripped of equipment before being presented to inspectors.

Pasechnik's revelations that the program was much greater in scope than previously suspected were confirmed in 1992 with the travel to the United States of Colonel Kanatzhan Baizakovich Alibekov (b. 1950). The latter, who subsequently adopted the name of Ken Alibek, had served as First Deputy Director of Biopreparat from 1988 to 1992. Alibekov later wrote the book Biohazard (1999) detailing publicly his extensive inside knowledge of the structure, goals, operations and achievements of Biopreparat. He was also featured in the October 13, 1998 episode of Frontline entitled "Plague War".

=== Changing role of Biopreparat, 1985 – present ===
Biopreparat had three distinct, and, at times overlapping, phases of its existence. From its origins in April 1974 through to the collapse of the Soviet Union in December 1991, and indeed for some undetermined time thereafter, it was engaged in a major offensive BW research programme. It also maintained five dual-use manufacturing plants. In March 1985, with the election by the Politboro of Mikhail Gorbachev as General Secretary of the CPSU, Biopreparat increased in size and political importance and began to emerge also as a major player with regard to the civil biopharmaceutical sector. By 1988, in this second phase, the Biopreparat network incorporated no less than 40 facilities, operating in 15 different cities and had control of domestic production of vaccines, antibiotics and other essential medicines. It was precisely at this moment that Alibekov emerged as a key interlocutor between Biopreparat and a number of Western pharmaceutical companies. In the third and final phase during the 2000s, Biopreparat was divested of control of nearly all R&D institutes and manufacturing facilities. Henceforward, it assumed a highly diminished role, focused on export control and other matters and only maintained a small headquarters staff.

== Operations ==
Biopreparat was a system of nominally civilian, research and design institutes, pilot plants and dual-use manufacturing facilities located mainly at sites in European Russia, in which a small army of scientists and technicians worked on bacterial and viral pathogens with a view to developing a new generation of biological weapons. It incorporated capacity with the potential to produce weaponized anthrax in the Soviet Union and was a leader in the development of new bioweapons technologies.

=== Facilities ===
The project incorporated the following R&D, design, pilot plant and production facilities:

- All-Union Scientific-Research Design Institute of Applied Biochemistry (VNIIbiokhimmashproekt), Moscow
- All-Union Scientific-Research Institute of Applied Microbiology (VNII PM), Obolensk
- All-Union Institute of Highly Pure Biochemical Preparations (VNII OChB), Leningrad
- All-Union Scientific-Research Institute of Molecular Biology (VNII MB), Kol'tsovo
- Institute of Immunology, Lyubuchany
- Experimental Design Bureau of Precision Biological Engineering (OKB TBM), Kirishi
- Experimental Design Bureau of Automation Equipment (OKBA), Yoshkar-Ola
- Stepnogorsk Scientific Experimental-Industrial Base (SNOPB), Stepnogorsk, northern Kazakhstan
- Berdsk Scientific Experimental-Industrial Base (BNOPB), Berdsk
- Omutninsk Scientific Experimental Industrial Base (ONOPB), Omutninsk
- Berdsk Chemical Factory, Berdsk
- Omutninsk Chemical Factory, Omutninsk

=== Pathogens ===
Research was conducted on a range of bacterial and viral pathogens with a view to their potential weaponization. These included:

- Bacillus anthracis (the causative agent of anthrax)
- Yersinia pestis (the causative agent of plague)
- Francisella tularensis (the causative agent of tularaemia)
- Brucella sp. (the causative agent of Brucellosis)
- Smallpox virus
- Venezuelan equine encephalitis virus
- Marburg virus
- Machupo virus

The only reliable data with regard to production capacity of weaponised agents concerns SNOPB (Stepnogorsk). Here, the plant is estimated to have incorporated capacity for the production of around 300 metric tonnes of weaponized B. anthracis spores per ten-month production cycle.

== Leaders ==
=== Directors ===
Major General (Reserves) Vsevolod Ivanovich Ogarkov (April 1974 – 1979)

Colonel (Reserves) Anatolii Anatol'evich Miklashevskii (1979)

Lieutenant General (Reserves) Yurii Tikhonovich Kalinin (1980 – April 2001)

=== First Deputy Directors ===
Major General (Reserves) Anatoliy Vorobyev (1978–1988)

Colonel (Reserves) Kanatzhan Alibekov (1988–1992)

== See also ==
- Soviet biological weapons program
- Ken Alibek (defected in 1992)
- Yuri Ovchinnikov
- Poison laboratory of the Soviet secret services
- Sergei Popov (defected in 1992)
- Porton Down - Comparable facility in England
- Dugway Proving Ground and Fort Detrick - Comparable facilities in the United States.
