= Ivan Mikhailovich Velikanov =

Soviet microbiologist

Ivan Mikhailovich Velikanov (7 November 1898 – 8 April 1938), was a Soviet microbiologist who served in the late 1920s and 1930s as chief scientist of Stalin's offensive biological weapons programme.

== Early life ==
Velikanov was born on the 7 November 1898 in the village of Yamanovo, near Kovrov, Vladimir Oblast. Prior to the October 1917 revolution he was employed as a timekeeper and clerk at the local mechanical works. In the aftermath of the revolution, Velikanov enrolled in the Faculty of Medicine at the First Moscow State Medical University. He graduated from the university in 1923. He then enrolled as a microbiologist in the Institute of Red Professors. This institution had been established in 1921 with the aim of recruiting and training a new socialist intelligentsia. He graduated from the institute in 1928 with the title of Professor. In the same year he enrolled for service within the Red Army.

== A lead military biological scientist ==
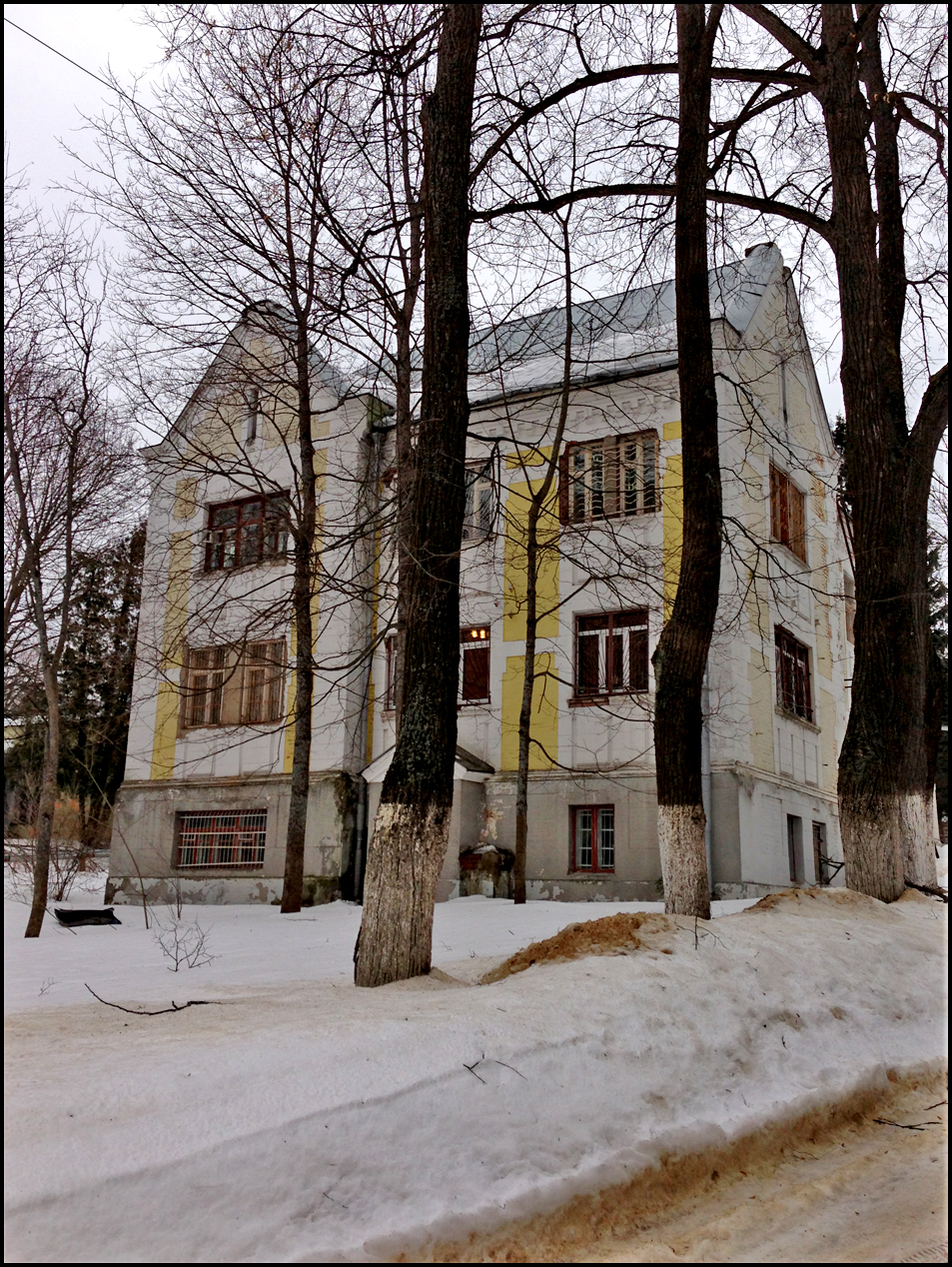
View of the building formerly housing the Biotechnical Institute, Vlasikha, Moscow Oblast.

Velikanov is described as a highly talented scientist and was appointed at a young age as Professor and Head of department at the Department of Microbiology at Moscow State University. In 1928 he was appointed director of a new facility belonging to the Red Army, the Military Vaccine-Sera Laboratory, in Vlasikha, close to the Perkhushkovo railway station, approximately 30 miles to the west of Moscow. At this time Velikanov held the rank of Divisional Doctor which corresponds to the rank of Major General in the modern Russian armed forces.

Velikanov served concomitantly as the Head of the secret Ninth Department of the Institute of Chemical Defence (IKhO). This Department was engaged in secret offensive biological warfare research involving anthrax, tularaemia, and plague bacteria. The use of Clostridium botulinum for sabotage purposes was also being considered. IKhO was itself subordinate to the Red Army's Military-Chemical Directorate (Voenno—khimicheskoe upravlenie, abbreviated to VOKhIMU) headed by Yakov Fishman.

During the period from 1929 through to 1936, Velikanov established an extensive programme of prophylaxis and therapy of botulism poisoning. His most significant scientific research relates to his work on modifying the botulinum toxin to the nontoxic form of a toxoid. In 1934 and 1936, Velikanov reported the first experimental immunization of human subjects with botulinum toxoids. The serum which he developed against botulism is reported to have saved the lives of many thousands of people. In 1935 Velikanov published The Microbiology of Tinned Goods (Mikrobiologiya konservov). His work was still being cited by Soviet authors in the 1960s.

There was almost certainly a military dimension to Velikanov's programme of research on botulism. In 1961, a CIA report on the Soviet BW programme noted that “Political refugees from the Soviet Union contend that botulinum toxin was one of the earliest candidates for agent development, chosen primarily because of its potential effectiveness by ground, air or water dispersion. Unconfirmed reports state that a purification process and suitable disseminating media were two major problems encountered in the preliminary investigations; by 1940-1941, studies on agent properties were allegedly in progress and the toxin was purportedly being stockpiled………”

The CIA report notes that one scientist in particular - possibly Velikanov himself, although the name has been redacted in the released document - “is said to have seen 227 cases of botulinum intoxication in humans, and his computations on comparative fatality rates among treated cases and untreated controls are one of the few hints of suspected human experimentation related to BW in the USSR“.

== Pivotal meeting on biological warfare programme with Stalin ==
On the 15 April 1934, Velikanov attended a meeting of the Politburo where he was a keynote speaker. Besides Stalin himself, among the political leaders attending the meeting were Molotov, Kalinin, Kaganovich, Kuibyshev, Voroshilov, Ordzhonikidze, Andreev, Yagoda and Mikoyan. As well as Velikanov, the scientists attending the meeting included Yakov Moiseevich Fishman, who, since August 1925, had headed-up the Red Army's Military-Chemical Directorate. Also present were Karl Yur’evich Yanel’ (head of the Red Army's Institute of Chemical Warfare Defence - IKhO) and Efim Il’ich Demikhovskii (head of IKhO’s Ninth Department working on anthrax aerosols and botulinum toxins). As a direct result of the meeting, Stalin decided to concentrate the various unconnected strands of the country's BW programme within a single powerful institution - the newly created Biotechnical Institute. Stalin's enthusiastic reaction to the meeting meant that new resources were immediately provided to the BW effort, with the prime example being the transfer to it of a state-of-the-art virology institute on Gorodomlya Island, fitted out with the latest Soviet and Western technology. From this point in history through to its collapse in December 1991, the Soviet Union lavished huge resources on its secret offensive BW programme.

== Management of the Biotechnical Institute & Expeditions to Vozrozhdenie Island ==
Immediately after the meeting with Stalin, Velikanov was appointed Director of the Biotechnical Institute, also known by its codename of V/2-1094 which, as indicated, was located on Gorodomlya Island (Lake Seliger) close to the town of Ostashkov in Tver (at that time named Kalinin) oblast’. In the Summer of 1935, Velikanov's institute conducted trials of biological munitions at the chemical weapons proving ground at Shikhany. Later, in the same year Velikanov's institute selected a 10,000 km2 tract of land on Vozrozhdenie Island in the Aral Sea as a new BW proving ground. Velikanov led the first expedition to the island in the summer of 1936. This comprised more than 100 specialists and support staff from Institute No. V/2-1094. Velikanov was provided with special ships and two airplanes and reportedly conducted experiments involving the spread of tularaemia and related microorganisms.

== Velikanov's arrest and execution ==
It is interesting to note that the first indications that Velikanov had that he was under personal threat from the Soviet security apparatus came in the wake of his meetings with Stalin. These were apparently very unpleasant for Velikanov, who afterwards was invited for discussions with NKVD personnel. As early as the beginning of 1937, NKVD agents are reported to have begun shadowing Velikanov. They also recruited personnel from his own institute to inform on his activities. Velikanov was one of a large number of prominent BW specialists to be arrested by the security organs during the mass repression (dubbed the Great Terror) instigated within the Soviet Union by Stalin. Velikanov was arrested on the 6 July 1937 on the territory of his own institute in Vlasikha. Other victims at the Biotechnical Institute included Velikanov's wife, Zoya Ivanova Mikhailova (also a military doctor). On the 8 April 1938 Velikanov was accused by the Military Collegium of the USSR Supreme Court of being an active participant of a military-fascist conspiracy, into which he had been tempted by the national enemy, Tukhasheviskii, in 1936. At the latter's command Velikanov was alleged to have conducted sabotage in the sphere of the country's defence and prepared for the destruction of the Moscow population through food poisoning. In addition it was alleged that during his visit to Japan in 1934, he was recruited by the Japanese to undertake reconnaissance for terrorist activities. He was tried and condemned to death by shooting with confiscation of all property, as a spy and member of a “counter-revolutionary military plot”. Velikanov refused to admit his guilt and was executed later that same day.

== Rehabilitation and official Russian recognition ==
Velikanov was officially rehabilitated on the 13 June 1956 (Velikanov, 1993). The reappraisal of Velikanov's career culminated in 2004 with this tribute made by R.N. Lukina, writing in an official volume published to mark the 50th anniversary of the Russian Ministry of Defences’ Virology Centre: “Ivan Mikhailovich Velikanov ranks among the outstanding microbiologists of the late 1930s – mid-1940s. Although I.M. Velikanov does not have a direct connection to the founding of the Virology Centre, it is impossible not to give credit to this wonderful scientist, who, being one of the pioneers of military microbiology, stood at the source of the foundation of the system of anti-epidemiological defence of both troops and the population. He was the organiser and supervisor of the Red Army's Biotechnological Institute, a forerunner of the Russian Ministry of Defence's Scientific-Research Sanitary Institute”.
