= McNeill's law =

In human geography, McNeill's law is the process outlined in William H. McNeill's book Plagues and Peoples. The process described concerns the role of microbial disease in the conquering of people-groups. Particularly, it describes how diseases such as smallpox, measles, typhus, scarlet fever, and sexually-transmitted diseases have significantly reduced native populations so that they are unable to resist colonization.

== Concept ==
According to McNeill's Law, the microbiological aspect of conquest and invasion has been the deciding principle or one of the deciding principles in both the expansion of certain empires (as during the emigration to the Americas) and the containment in others (as during the crusades). The argument is that less civilized peoples were easily subjugated due to the immunological advantages of those coming from civilized countries. An evidence presented to support the hypothesis involves the manner diseases associated with Europeans were rebuffed in their forays into disease-experienced countries such as China and Japan.

McNeill's law also maintains that parasites are not only natural but also social in the sense that these organisms are part of the social continuum and that the human social evolution is inextricably linked with genetic transformations.

== Instances in history ==
The first people-group fully wiped out due to European expansion (with the possible exception of the Arawaks) was the Guanches of the Canary Islands. Despite an inbred ferocity, superior knowledge of the land and even a possible tactical superiority, they were eventually wiped out through the concentrated efforts of the Spanish and Portuguese. McNeill's Law would place the deciding factor squarely on the introduction of deadly diseases and parasites from the mainland to the previously geographically isolated islanders.

This is the likely explanation, as what records still exist show numerous deaths by disease on the islands and a declining birth rate, leading eventually to the almost complete end of the Guanches as a race.

Other instances include the devastation of the Incas by smallpox.
