= Biohazard (book) =

1999 book by Ken Alibek

- Author: Ken Alibek
- Publication date: 1999
- ISBN: 0-385-33496-6

Biohazard, subtitled The Chilling True Story of the Largest Covert Biological Weapons Program in the World - Told from Inside by the Man Who Ran It, is a 1999 book by former Soviet biological warfare researcher Ken Alibek that purports to expose the former Soviet Union's extensive covert biological weapons program.

The book is a autobiography of Alibek's life as a bioweapons developer in the former Soviet Union. It was first published by Hutchinson in the United Kingdom in 1999, and later then rereleased by Arrow Books in 2000.

The book also details the worst anthrax outbreak in history, the Sverdlovsk anthrax leak, which led to 68 confirmed deaths.

== The book ==
Alibek, K. and S. Handelman. Biohazard: The Chilling True Story of the Largest Covert Biological Weapons Program in the World - Told from Inside by the Man Who Ran it. 1999. Delta (2000) ISBN 0-385-33496-6
