= State Research Center of Virology and Biotechnology VECTOR =

Russian government public health agency

State Research Center of Virology and Biotechnology VECTOR of Rospotrebnadzor
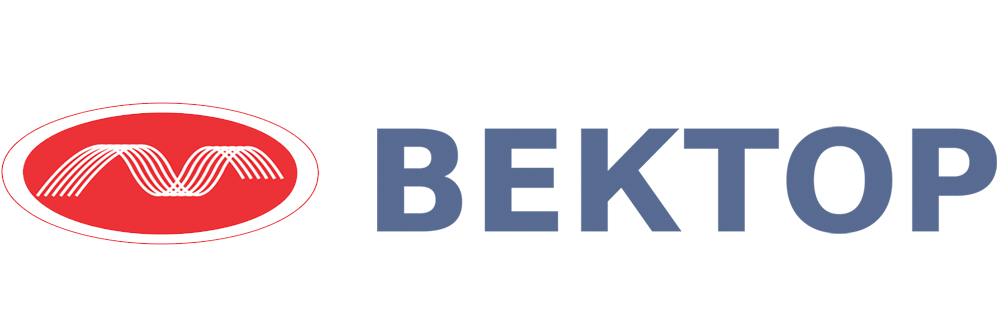

Agency overview
- Formed: 1974; 52 years ago
- Jurisdiction: Government of the Russian Federation
- Headquarters: Koltsovo, Novosibirsk Oblast, Russia; 54°56′17″N 83°13′35.92″E
- Employees: 1,614
- Parent agency: Rospotrebnadzor
- Website: www.vector.nsc.ru

The State Research Center of Virology and Biotechnology VECTOR of Rospotrebnadzor (Russian: Государственный научный центр вирусологии и биотехнологии «Вектор» Роспотребнадзора, romanized: Gosudarstvennyy nauchnyy tsentr virusologii i biotekhnologii "Vektor" Rospotrebnadzora), also known as the Vector Institute, is a biological research center under Rospotrebnadzor in Koltsovo, Novosibirsk Oblast, Russia. It has research facilities and capabilities for all levels of biological hazard, CDC levels 1–4. It is one of two official repositories for the now-eradicated smallpox virus, (Note: The other repository is the CDC in Atlanta, Georgia.) and was part of the system of laboratories known as the Biopreparat.

The facility was upgraded and secured using modern cameras, motion sensors, fences and biohazard containment systems. Its relative seclusion makes security an easier task. Since its inception there has been an army regiment guarding the facility.

At least in Soviet times the facility was a nexus for biological warfare research (see Soviet biological weapons program), though the nature of any ongoing research in this area is uncertain.

As of April 2022 the Vector Institute is the Russian site for the WHO H5 Reference Laboratory Network, which responds "to the public health needs arising from avian influenza A (H5N1) infection in humans and influenza pandemic preparedness".

== History ==
Organized in 1974, the center has a long history of virology, making impressive Soviet contribution to smallpox research. Genetic engineering projects included creation of viruses that manufacture toxins as well as research on bioregulators and various peptides that function in the nervous system. In the post-Soviet times the center made research and development contributions in many projects like a vaccine for Hepatitis A, influenza vaccines, vaccines for the Ebola virus, antiviral drugs with nucleotide analogs, test-systems for diagnostics of HIV and Hepatitis B and other development. It is one of the two laboratories worldwide that are authorized to keep smallpox.

=== COVID-19 vaccine development ===
In March 2020 it was reported that Russian scientists have begun to test vaccine prototypes for the new coronavirus disease (COVID-19), with the plan of presenting the most effective one in June, a laboratory chief at Vector Institute said. The prototypes have been created and the testing on animals began.

In July 2020, research by the centre found that the SARS-CoV-2 virus that causes COVID-19 can be killed in room temperature water within 72 hours, helping further research about the disease during the pandemic.

== Tasks ==
The main tasks of the centre, according to VECTOR, are:

- Basic research of causative agents of especially dangerous and socially important viral infections, and their genetic variability and diversity, pathogenesis of viral infections.
- Ensuring constant readiness for implementing diagnostics of especially dangerous infectious agents.
- The development and introduction into healthy practice of diagnostic curative and preventive medicines.
- Post-graduate training, and scientific training of higher qualification in the field of Virology, molecular biology and biotechnology through graduate school and higher education.

== Accidents ==
On 30 April 1988, a doctor died two weeks after accidentally pricking himself through two layers of rubber gloves with a needle contaminated with the Marburg virus.

In 2004, a researcher at VECTOR died after accidentally pricking herself with a needle contaminated with the Ebola virus.

On 17 September 2019, a gas explosion occurred at Vector. One worker suffered third-degree burns, and the blast blew out window panes. The explosion happened in a decontamination room that was being renovated by a contractor.

== See also ==
- Smallpox
