= Institute of Applied Biochemistry =

Laboratory in Omutninsk, Kirov, Russia

The Institute of Applied Biochemistry is a research laboratory and bioweapons production facility located in Omutninsk, Kirov Oblast. For a time in the 1980s, the facility was directed by Ken Alibek.

Wild rodents like rats that live in the woods outside the factory are chronically infected with the "Schu-4 military strain" of tularemia due to a "small leak" in a basement pipe found in the twilight years of the USSR to be dripping a viral suspension into the ground.
