= List of laboratory biosecurity incidents =

Failures to secure dangerous animals and pathogens

This list of laboratory biosecurity incidents includes accidental laboratory-acquired infections and laboratory releases of lethal pathogens, containment failures in or during transport of lethal pathogens, and incidents of exposure of lethal pathogens to laboratory personnel, improper disposal of contaminated waste, and/or the escape of laboratory animals. The list is grouped by the year in which the accident or incident occurred and does not include every reported laboratory-acquired infection.

Date (Note: yyyy-mm-dd)	Main article	Pathogen	Country	Description
1903		Burkholderia mallei	United States	A laboratory worker became infected with bacterium Burkholderia mallei and developed glanders while performing an autopsy on an inoculated guinea-pig. She had a small open wound on her finger while working. The laboratory worker survived.
1932		B virus	United States	William Brebner died from a viral infection after being bitten by a rhesus monkey during research. The viral agent was later discovered to be the B virus, which was named in memory of Brebner.
1943-04-27	Dora Lush	Scrub typhus	Australia	Dora Lush died after accidentally pricking her finger with a needle containing lethal scrub typhus while attempting to develop a vaccine for the disease.
1960–1993		Foot-and-mouth disease	Europe	Foot-and-mouth disease virus accidentally released at least 13 times from European laboratories, including those producing FMDV vaccines, between 1960 and 1993 causing nearby foot-and-mouth disease outbreaks.
1966	1966 smallpox outbreak in the United Kingdom	Smallpox	United Kingdom	The 1966 smallpox outbreak in the United Kingdom was an outbreak of mild smallpox which began with Tony McLennan, a photographer at the Medical School in Birmingham, which housed a smallpox laboratory and where 12 years later a fatal smallpox outbreak would occur, also beginning with a medical photographer.
1967	1967 Marburg virus outbreak in West Germany	Marburg virus	Germany	The 1967 Marburg virus outbreak in West Germany was an outbreak of Marburg hemorrhagic fever initially among laboratory workers who were exposed to imported African green monkeys or their tissues while conducting research. A total of 31 people (laboratory workers and their contacts) became sick, seven of whom died.
1969		Lassa fever	United States	Laboratory accident resulted in two scientists infected and one died.
1971-07-30	1971 Aral smallpox incident	Smallpox	Soviet Union	The 1971 Aral smallpox incident was the outbreak of viral disease which occurred as a result of a field test at a Soviet biological weapons facility on an island in the Aral Sea. The incident sickened ten people, of whom three died, and came to widespread public notice only in 2002.
1972-03		Smallpox	United Kingdom	A 23-year-old laboratory assistant at the London School of Hygiene and Tropical Medicine, was infected with smallpox after observing the harvesting of live smallpox virus from eggs without isolation cabinets at that time. The assistant was hospitalised and before being isolated, she infected two visitors to a patient in an adjacent bed, both of whom died. They in turn infected a nurse, who survived.
1963–1977		Chikungunya, Dugbe, Wesselsbron, Dengue, Orungo and Rift valley fever viruses	Nigeria	Between 1963 and 1977 at the Virus Research Laboratory, Ibadan, Nigeria: "Two cases of Chikungunya infection occurred and one each with Dugbe, Wesselsbron, and Dengue viruses ... Among 22 staff members who were monitored during this interval, three seroconverted to Orungo virus and two each to Chikungunya and Rift Valley fever viruses, without experiencing any clinically recognized disease".
1976		Ebola	United Kingdom	Ebola laboratory infection by the accidental stick of contaminated needle in the United Kingdom.
1977–1979	1977 Russian flu	H1N1 influenza virus	Soviet Union / China	H1N1 influenza virus reappeared circulating in humans in 1977, in the Soviet Union and China. Some virologists, including Joel Wertheim, Shanta Zimmer, and Donald Burke, have suggested the cause of the reappearance was a laboratory escape of a 1949-1950 virus, based on serologic and genetic testing. The WHO conducted an investigation in 1978, after which they concluded the virus was likely not of laboratory origin. Other virologists, such as Peter Palese and Chi-Ming Chu, have suggested the 1977 outbreak was the result of human challenge trials of a vaccine against the 1950 H1N1 virus.
1978-08-11	1978 smallpox outbreak in the United Kingdom	Smallpox	United Kingdom	The 1978 smallpox outbreak in the United Kingdom occurred due to accidental exposure of a strain of smallpox virus that had been grown in a research laboratory in The East Wing of the University of Birmingham Medical School, leading to the illness and death of Janet Parker, who became the last recorded person to die of the disease.
1978	Plum Island Animal Disease Center	Foot-and-mouth disease	United States	Foot and mouth disease was released to animals outside the center.
1979-04-02	Sverdlovsk anthrax leak	Anthrax	Soviet Union	Spores of anthrax were accidentally released from a Soviet military research facility near the city of Sverdlovsk, Russia (now Yekaterinburg), resulting in approximately 100 deaths, although the exact number of victims remains unknown. The cause of the outbreak was denied by the Soviet authorities, and all medical records of the victims were removed to hide serious violations of the Biological Weapons Convention that had come in effect in 1975. Scientists from the United States ultimately proved the incident was the result of an aerosolized plume of anthrax spores which were genetically identical to the strain studied in a nearby laboratory, not from environmentally contaminated meat, which was the official Soviet explanation. The accident is sometimes referred to as "biological Chernobyl".
1988	Marburg virus disease	Marburg virus	Soviet Union	Researcher Nikolai Ustinov was lethally infected with the Marburg virus after accidentally pricking himself with a syringe used for inoculation of guinea pigs. The accident occurred at the Scientific-Production Association "Vektor" (today the State Research Center of Virology and Biotechnology "Vektor") in Koltsovo, USSR (today Russia).
1990	Marburg virus outbreak	Marburg virus	Soviet Union	There was an outbreak of Marburg virus due to a laboratory accident in Koltsovo, Soviet Union, killing one lab worker.
1994		Sabia Virus	United States	Centrifuge accident in BSL3 laboratory at Yale University.
2001	2001 anthrax attacks	Anthrax	United States	On September 18, 2001, one week after the September 11 terrorist attacks, letters containing anthrax spores were mailed to several news media offices and to Democratic Senators Tom Daschle and Patrick Leahy, killing five people and infecting 17 others. According to the Federal Bureau of Investigation, the ensuing investigation became "one of the largest and most complex in the history of law enforcement". On August 6, 2008, Federal prosecutors declared Bruce Edwards Ivins the sole culprit, based on DNA evidence leading to an anthrax vial in his lab.
2002		Anthrax	United States	2002 Fort Detrick anthrax containment breach
2002		West Nile virus	United States	Two cases of laboratory-acquired West Nile virus infections through dermal punctures.
2002		Arthroderma benhamiae	Japan	Incident in Japan with Arthroderma benhamiae.
2003-08	Severe acute respiratory syndrome	SARS	Singapore	A 27-year-old doctoral student at the Singapore General Hospital (SGH) developed symptoms consistent with severe acute respiratory syndrome (SARS). An investigation found that the student was infected with samples from SARS coronavirus in the Department of Pathology, while its two BSL-2 and BSL-3 laboratories were undergoing renovation, which compromised safety practices.
2003-12	Severe acute respiratory syndrome	SARS	Taiwan	A 44-year-old senior scientist at the National Defense University in Taipei was confirmed to have the SARS virus. He had been working on a SARS study in Taiwan's only BSL-4 lab. The Taiwan CDC later stated the infection occurred due to laboratory misconduct.
2004-04	Severe acute respiratory syndrome	SARS	China	Two researchers at the Chinese Center for Disease Control and Prevention contracted the virus in Beijing, China around April 2004, and then spread the infection to around six other people. The two researchers contracted the virus in two incidents, two weeks apart.
2004-05-05		Ebola	Russia	A researcher at Russian biological weapons research facility VECTOR died after accidentally pricking herself with a needle contaminated with the Ebola virus.
2004	Plum Island Animal Disease Center	Foot-and-mouth-disease	United States	Two incidents of foot-and-mouth disease outbreak at Plum Island.
2004		Tuberculosis	United States	A researcher and two technicians at the Infectious Disease Research Institute were infected with tuberculosis while developing a vaccine for the disease. The exact cause of the infection is unknown, but the accident occurred while infecting guinea pigs in a small chamber with the bacteria.
2005		H2N2 influenza virus	United States and 17 other countries	The 1957 pandemic strain of H2N2 influenza virus was included in routine testing kits sent to over 5,000 laboratories, mostly in the United States. The virus was to be used as a positive control in the testing kits when prepared by Meridien Biosciences, but as no one born after 1968 likely has immunity to the virus, this was considered an "unwise" choice of strain by Klaus Stohr, WHO influenza chief at the time.
2005 – 2015		Anthrax	United States	From 2005 to 2015, the U.S. Army Dugway Proving Ground mistakenly shipped live anthrax at least 74 times to dozens of labs.
2007-07	2007 United Kingdom foot-and-mouth outbreak	Foot-and-mouth-disease	United Kingdom	The 2007 United Kingdom foot-and-mouth outbreak was the accidental discharge of virus FMDV BFS 1860 O from a laboratory of the Institute for Animal Health in Pirbright, through possible leakage from broken pipework and via unsealed overflowing manholes, leading to foot-and-mouth disease infections at multiple nearby farms and the culling of over 2,000 animals.
2006		Brucella	United States	
2006		Q fever	United States	
2009-03-12		Ebola	Germany	Infection of a German researcher following an accidental laboratory exposure to Ebola, a virus with a high fatality rate.
2009-09-13	Malcolm Casadaban	Yersinia pestis	United States	Malcolm Casadaban died following an accidental laboratory exposure to an attenuated strain of Yersinia pestis, a bacterium that causes the plague.
2010		Classical swine fever virus	United States	In 2010 a release of classical swine fever virus, also known as hog cholera, resulted in the illness of two animals, which were euthanized.
2010		Cowpox	United States	Cross‐contamination led to the first laboratory‐acquired human cowpox virus infection in the US in a laboratory worker conducting research on non-orthopoxvirus.
2011		Dengue	Australia	A scientist at a research laboratory in Australia got infected with Dengue through a mosquito bite in the laboratory.
2012		Anthrax	United Kingdom	The UK's Animal and Plant Health Agency sent out live samples of anthrax by mistake. Its Surrey lab was subject to a Crown Prohibition Notice (CPN), closing it until improvements were made.
2012-04-28		Neisseria meningitidis	United States	Richard Din died after being infected during vaccine research into Neisseria meningitidis bacteria at a lab inside San Francisco's VA medical center.
2013		H5N1 influenza virus	United States	A researcher at the Center for Infectious Disease Research in Milwaukee accidentally punctured his gloved hand with a needle loaded with H5N1, a highly pathogenic avian influenza. This incident was one of four notifiable accidents involving dermal punctures at the facility.
2014		H1N1 influenza virus	United States	Eight mice, some of which may have possibly been infected with SARS or the H1N1 influenza virus, escaped primary containment at a laboratory at the University of North Carolina-Chapel Hill. The mice were recovered quickly within the lab and no transmission to workers was identified.
2014-03-12		H5N1 influenza virus	United States	Accidental shipping of H9N2 vials contaminated with H5N1 from the CDC lab to a USDA lab.
2014-06-05		Anthrax	United States	Accidental exposure of viable anthrax to 75 personnel at CDC's Roybal Campus.
2014-07-01		Smallpox	United States	Discovery of six vials containing viable smallpox from the 1950s labeled as Variola (another word for smallpox) in a Food and Drug Administration-managed room on the campus of the National Institutes of Health.
2014		Burkholderia pseudomallei	United States	Highly toxic Burkholderia pseudomallei bacteria escaped from a BSL-3 laboratory at the Tulane National Primate Research Center near New Orleans, likely on employees' clothes, infecting two monkeys that lived in outdoor cages and later infecting others.
2014		Ebola	Sierra Leone	A Senegalese epidemiologist was infected with Ebola at a BSL-4 laboratory in Kailahun, Sierra Leone. The World Health Organization later shut down the lab.
2014		Dengue	South Korea	A 30-year-old female laboratory worker in South Korea working at a BSL-2 was infected with Dengue through a needlestick injury.
2016		Zika virus	United States	Researcher infected with zika virus in a laboratory accident at University of Pittsburgh.
2016		Nocardia testacea	Australia	30 members of staff were exposed to toxic Nocardia testacea bacteria at a CSIRO's Black Mountain site in Canberra, Australia. The Australian government has confirmed this incident as one of two biosecurity incidents.
2016 - 2017		Brucella	China	In 2016 and 2017, hospital cleaning staff in Nanchang (Jiangxi, China) were accidentally infected with Brucella.
2018		Ebola	Hungary	Ebola from a laboratory accident led to a single worker being exposed to the Ebola virus, though he did not develop symptoms.
2019-09-17			Russia	A gas explosion occurred at Vector. One worker suffered third-degree burns, and the blast blew out window panes. In a statement, Vector said that no biohazard material was stored in the room where the explosion occurred.
2019	2021 French moratorium on prion research	Prions	France	Émilie Jaumain died from variant Creutzfeldt-Jakob disease (vCJD) ten years after pricking her thumb during an experiment with prion-infected mice at the Research Institute for Agriculture, Food and Environment (INRAE).
2019		Brucella	China	An accident in a laboratory at the Lanzhou Veterinary Research Institute caused 65 workers to become infected with brucellosis. More than 10,000 residents of Lanzhou were infected by November 2020. The outbreak was reportedly caused by incompletely sterilized waste gas from a nearby biopharmaceutical factory. The resulting bacteria-containing aerosols were carried in the wind to the Veterinary Research Institute, where the first cases were recorded in November 2019.
2021		SARS-CoV-2	Taiwan	In November 2021, during the COVID-19 pandemic, a research assistant at the Genomics Research Center of Academia Sinica in Taipei contracted COVID-19 at a time when Taiwan had no confirmed locally transmitted cases. The sequence of her virus matched a SARS-CoV-2 Delta variant strain held by the lab, rather than the Delta strains previously circulating in the community, and an investigation strongly suggested the infection occurred in the lab. It was apparently the first documented laboratory-acquired infection with SARS-CoV-2. Investigators found inadequate protective equipment, failure to follow procedures for biosafety cabinets and removing protective equipment, and insufficient staff training, and Academia Sinica was fined NT$150,000. All 110 close contacts and 373 other people connected to the case tested negative.
2022		Polio	Netherlands	Routine wastewater surveillance of the vaccine production facility at Utrecht Science Park/Bilthoven detected infectious poliovirus from a sample collected on 15 November 2022. Full genome sequencing indicated the sample was shedded from an active human infection of wild poliovirus type 3 (WPV3), and further testing of all employees with access to WPV3 found one employee was infected. The employee was isolated until their polio infection was resolved. It remains unclear how the employee became infected given the biosafety measures used at the facility.
2026		Pneumonic plague	Russia	In September 2026, Darya Shipilova, a researcher at a high-biosecurity facility in Siberia, Russia, told her colleagues at the Irkutsk Anti-Plague Institute that she had accidentally broken a test tube with live bacteria containing Yersinia pestis, while collecting samples for testing. She was later hospitalized and died.

== See also ==
- Biological hazard
- Biosafety level
- Laboratory safety
- List of anthrax outbreaks
- Select agent
- Cambridge Working Group
