= 2026 Russian plague scare =

2026 outbreak in Russian federation

In 2026, a possible case of pneumonic plague was suspected in the Russian region of Siberia. On 2 October 2026, Darya Shipilova (Russian: Дарья Шипилова), a 28-year old researcher at the Irkutsk Anti-Plague Research Institute of Siberia and the Far East in Irkutsk, Siberia, Russia, died under unclear circumstances, causing concern over a potential plague outbreak.

== Timeline ==
The disease was suspected after a 28-year-old female lab worker at a plague research institute in Siberia's Irkutsk region fell ill and died two days later, allegedly by contracting the plague via a broken test tube. According to Lyudi Baikala, an independent regional outlet, Darya Shipilova, a biochemist and researcher at the Irkutsk Anti-Plague Research Institute of Siberia and the Far East in Siberia, Russia, was hospitalised on 29 September 2026 in Shelekhov, Irkutsk Oblast, with severe pneumonia.

Unverified reports suggested she had fallen ill after a potential lab-break or after traveling to a different region. Independent regional reporting, cited by Radio Free Europe/Radio Liberty and others, said she had broken a test tube containing Yersinia pestis (pneumonic-plague bacteria) on 25 September. Russian authorities did not confirm that account.

According to the World Health Organization, Shipilova died in the early hours of 2 October, the cause not being confirmed.

As of 7 October 2026, 200 people had been quarantined.

== Reactions ==
=== Within Russia ===
Russian authorities have officially denied the existence of a plague outbreak, and have been accused of downplaying and covering up the plague.

Rospotrebnadzor, Russia's national public health agency, said Shipilova had been diagnosed with pneumonia of undetermined etiology, that expanded testing did not find microorganisms linked to her work, and that commissions examining biosafety at the institute found no accident involving pathogenic microorganisms. The agency said the sanitary situation in Irkutsk Oblast, Irkutsk, and Shelekhov was stable.

The day that Shipilova died, Irkutsk governor Igor Kobzev said that Anna Popova, head of Rospotrebnadzor, had called for an "extraordinary meeting" about a suspected case of "particularly dangerous infection" in the region. He stated that no people under observation had tested positive for infection.

Meanwhile the head of the neighbouring Buryatia region, Alexey Tsydenov, said that there had been a death of plague in the Irkutsk region, though his statement was later edited to say ″possibly died from plague″.

The former head of the national public health agency Rospotrebnadzor stated that the disease the researcher died of is "most likely not the plague, but even if confirmed, there will be no spread of this disease".

==== Quarantines and contact tracing ====
Despite official Russian insistence of there being no cause for alarm, about 200 contacts were placed under medical observation, and quarantines were reported at hospitals in the region. Independent sources told Radio Free Europe/Radio Liberty that institute staff had been confined to the building from 2 October while awaiting test results. According to Russian media, 60 of her colleagues had been locked inside the institute since 2 October, sleeping on chairs and floors amidst tests being run. Similar measures were reported in five hospitals. Russian officials said no one in contact with Shipilova had tested positive for pneumonic plague.

=== Outside Russia ===
The World Health Organization (WHO) have assessed the suspected outbreak as "moderate to low" risk for the immediate region, "low" risk for the rest of Russia, and "very low" risk for Europe. The WHO said Russian officials had informed it that no case of plague had been recorded in Irkutsk. Deutsche Welle assessed claims of a plague leak as unproven.

The incident received widespread coverage outside Russia and prompted several countries to issue travel warnings. Several countries implemented health survelliance and control measures near borders with Russia and on national entry points. On 6 October, the countries of Kazakhstan, Kyrgyzstan, and Uzbekistan said they had stepped up precautionary measures at their borders with Russia against possible infectious diseases. Mongolia on 7 October announced health survelliance measures near the border with Russia.

PBS News Hour said on 5 October that the U.S. was following the case closely. The US State Department announced that it is monitoring the situation and has requested the Russian government to give further information on the incident. American president Donald Trump has offered assistance, stating that he will be discussing the incident in meeting with Russian president Vladimir Putin.

The European Commission said that it was monitoring the outbreak alongside the European Center for Disease Prevention and Control. The European Union said on 6 October that its Commission and representatives planned to meet by 7 October to discuss the incident, with Health Security Committee adding risk of outbreak 'not yet confirmed'. The European Centre for Disease Prevention and Control said that "there is little travel between Irkutsk and the EU, particularly at present due to Russia's war against Ukraine".

On 7 October, the WHO said the risk of an epidemic was low, while urging Russia to be transparent about Shipilova's death. The WHO was unable to figure out what caused the fatal pneumonia that killed Darya Shipilova. It also confirmed that the incident had not been tied to any plague cases. Russian health authorities told the WHO that tests on Shipilova and on her contacts came back negative for the pathogens they had checked for. The WHO said there was no evidence of continuing transmission, but it admitted that without a confirmed diagnosis, a central question remains unanswered.

Academics and EU legislators said the case reveals weaknesses in the effectiveness of the International Health Regulations in ensuring transparency about potential disease outbreaks.

== Research ==
As of 7 October 2026, the research is ongoing and the plague has not yet been formally named. It is caused by the bacteria Yersinia pestis.

== See also ==
- Sverdlovsk anthrax leak
