= Anthrax Island =

Anthrax Island may refer to one of three sites for hazardous biological disease testing:

- Gruinard Island, a Scottish island in the United Kingdom used in World War II
- Vozrozhdeniya Island, in the Aral Sea, used by the Soviet Union in the Cold War
- Plum Island (New York), off Long Island, New York in the United States, the location of a testing lab for hazardous livestock diseases
