= Laboratory-acquired infection =

Infection obtained from a laboratory

A laboratory-acquired infection (LAI) is an infection that is acquired in a laboratory, usually as part of a medical research facility or hospital.

== Causes ==
There are various microbes, viruses, fungi, and parasites that can infect a host via several routes of transmission.

Types of infectious agents
Agent	Description
Microorganisms	Microorganisms, or microbes are extremely diverse microscopic organisms, including archaea and bacteria, which are commonly grown and studied in laboratories and can infect laboratory animals and laboratory workers.
Viruses	Viruses infect all types of life forms, from animals and plants to microorganisms, including bacteria and archaea, and are commonly passaged and studied in laboratories, which can directly or indirectly cause zoonotic infection of laboratory animals and laboratory workers.
Parasites	Parasites may include various types of protozoa, worms and ectoparasites which are studied in laboratories and which can cause the infection of laboratory workers and animals.

Routes of transmission
Route	Description
Mucous membranes	This occurs when microbes, viruses and/or parasites are transmitted through direct contact with laboratory workers, or contaminated surfaces, or items such as vials, devices, and/or equipment, to the host's mucous membranes.
Respiratory tract	This occurs with the dissemination of either airborne droplet nuclei of evaporated droplets containing microorganisms or viruses, or dust particles containing the infectious agent, are transmitted via the host's respiratory tract. Microorganisms carried in this manner can be dispersed widely by air currents and may become inhaled by the infected host within the same room or over a longer distance from the source host, depending on environmental factors.
Gastrointestinal tract	This occurs with the oral intake of an infectious agent through a pipette, smoking or eating, infecting the host through their gastrointestinal tract.
Percutaneous inoculation	This occurs with a vector, such as mosquitoes, flies, rats, and other vermin transmit microbes, viruses and/or parasites to a host through a bite or scratch; or the transmission of an agent carrying an infectious pathogen through a needle or syringe.

== Prevention ==
Laboratory facilities handling microbes, viruses and/or parasites adhere to various biosecurity measures in order to prevent biosecurity accidents and incidents.

=== OECD Best Practice Guidelines for Biological Resource Centres ===
In 2001, experts from OECD countries created a consensus report called, calling upon "national governments to undertake actions to bring the BRC concept into being in concert with the international scientific community". The report details "Biological Resource Centres" (BRCs) as "repositories and providers of high-quality biological materials and information".

== History ==
The first laboratory-acquired infection was reported at the time of Pasteur and Koch in 1890.

Prior to 1950, few reports were made on laboratory-acquired infections, due to the lower level of awareness concerning the problem. In 1951, a paper from Sulkin and Pike presented data on viral infections contracted in laboratories, which advised caution on handling viruses in laboratory environments and brought public awareness to the issue. Soon after, the American Public Health Association formed a standing committee on Laboratory Infections and Accidents and created a file to document cases of laboratory-acquired infections reported by the public and through private communications.

== See also ==
- Dora Lush
- Biotechnology risk
- Biosafety level
- List of accidents and incidents involving laboratory biosecurity
