= Kantubek =

Ghost town on an island in the Aral Sea

Native name: Russian: Кантубек Uzbek: Kantubek Karakalpak: Qantubek
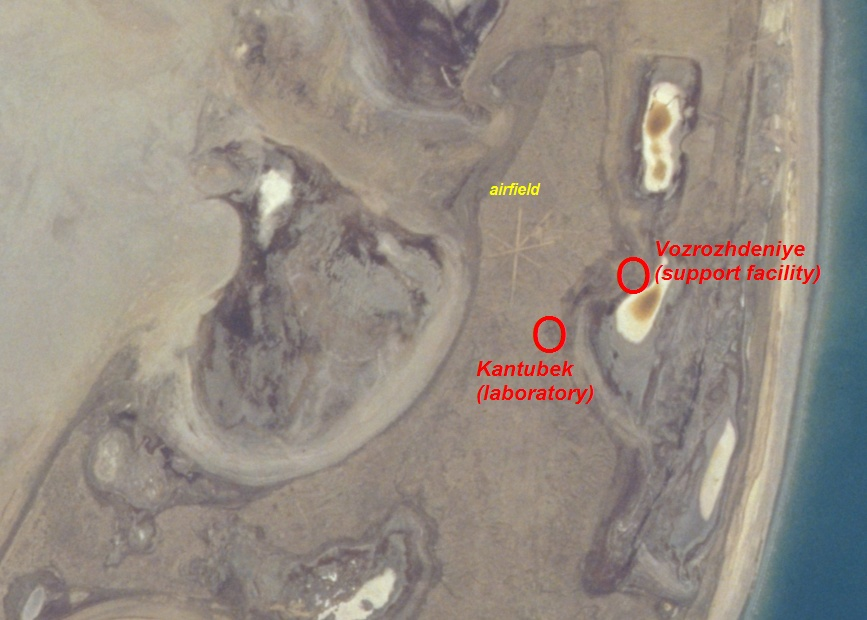
- Satellite image of former Kantubek, November 1997
- Interactive map of Kantubek

Geography
- Location: Central Asia
- Coordinates: 45°09′17″N 59°20′06″E

Demographics
- Population: 0 (2020)

Kantubek (Russian: Кантубек; Karakalpak: Qantubek) is a ghost town on Vozrozhdeniya Island in the Aral Sea. The town is still found on maps but was abandoned in 1992 following the dissolution of the Soviet Union. It has since been demolished, and there are plans to make the area a national park. Kantubek used to have a population of approximately 1,500 and housed scientists and employees of the Soviet Union's top-secret Aralsk-7 biological weapons research and test site.

Brian Hayes, a biochemical engineer with the United States Defense Threat Reduction Agency, led an expedition in the spring and summer of 2002 to neutralize what was believed to be the world's largest anthrax dumping grounds. His team of 113 people neutralized between 100 and 200 tonnes of anthrax over a three-month period. The cost of the cleanup operation was approximately US$5 million.

== See also ==
- Vozrozhdeniya Island
- Gruinard Island in Scotland, used for anthrax testing
