= Gennady Onishchenko =

Russian government official

- Геннадий Онищенко
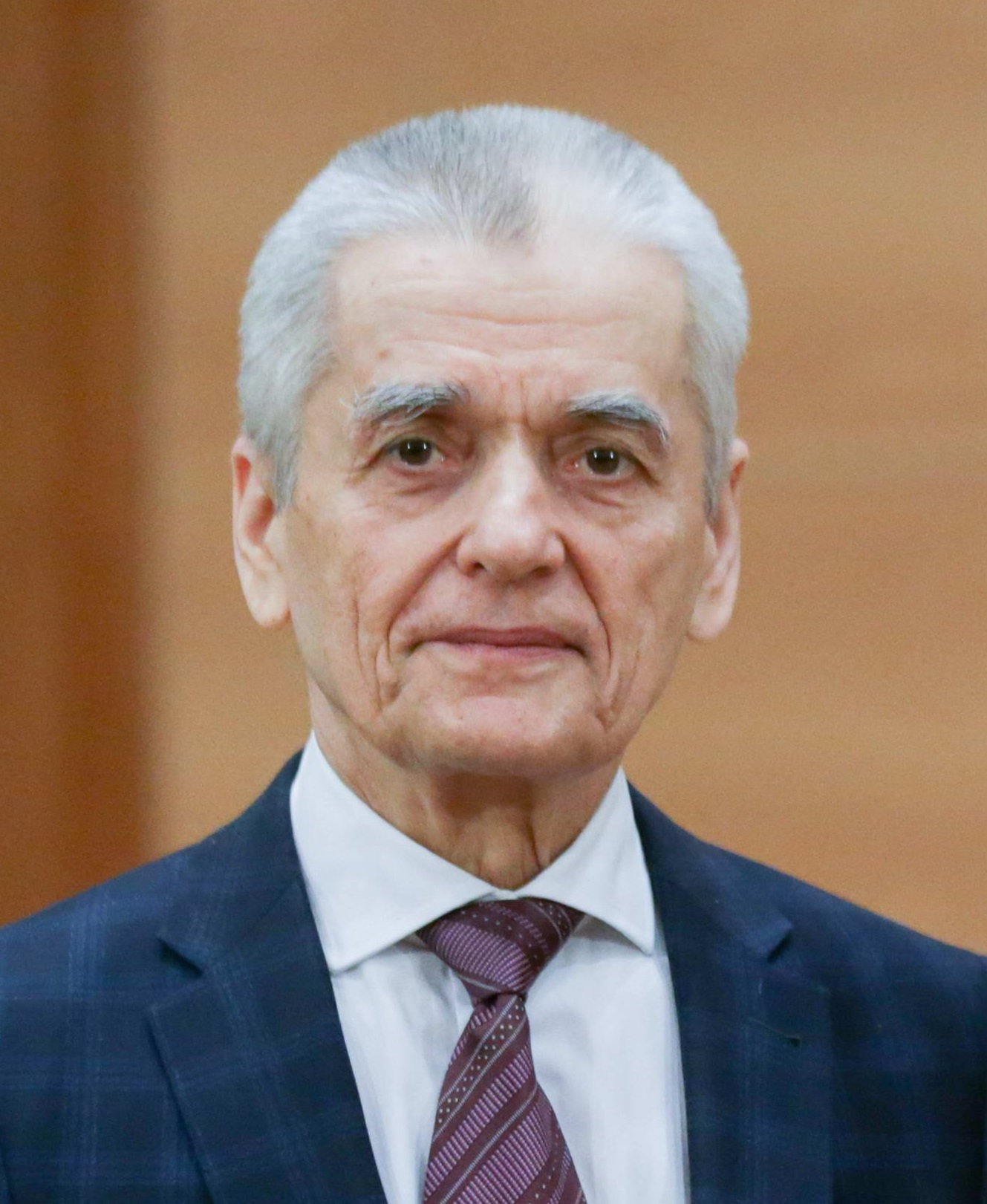
- Onishchenko in 2019

Member of the State Duma from Moscow's Tushino constituency
- In office 10 October 2016 – 12 October 2021
- Succeeded by: Alexander Mazhuga

Chief Sanitary Inspector of Russia
- In office 25 October 1996 – 23 October 2013
- Preceded by: Yevgeny Belyayev
- Succeeded by: Anna Popova

Personal details
- Born: November 20, 1950 (age 75) Changyr-Tash, Jalal-Abad Oblast, Kirghiz SSR, Soviet Union
- Awards: Alt text

Gennadiy Onishchenko's voice
recorded January 2013

Gennadiy Grigoryevich Onishchenko (Russian: Геннадий Григорьевич Онищенко, born 20 November 1950) is a Russian government official who was the Chief Sanitary Inspector of Russia from 1996 to 2013. He has the federal state civilian service rank of 1st class Active State Councillor of the Russian Federation.

== Early life ==
Gennady Onishchenko was born on 20 November 1950 in Changyr-Tash village, modern Kyrgyzstan. In 1973 he graduated from the M. Gorky Donetsk State Medical Institute. He is a Candidate Master of Sports in weightlifting.

From 1973 to 1987 he worked in the Ministry of Railways of the USSR as a doctor-epidemiologist. In 1982 he became the chief sanitary doctor of the Moscow metro, in 1983 — the head of the central sanitary and epidemiological station of the Ministry of Railways. In 1988 he was appointed Deputy Head of the Main Directorate of Quarantine Infections of the USSR Ministry of Health. Onishchenko participated in the liquidation of the Chernobyl disaster.

In the fall of 1995, during the First Chechen War, Onishchenko was kidnapped on the way from Mozdok to Grozny, and was held captive by Chechen separatists.

From 1993 to 2002 he was a member of the Constructive-Ecological Movement of Russia "Kedr", transformed into the Russian Ecological Party "The Greens" in 2002.

On June 24, 2009, Eduard Kokoity granted Onishchenko honorary citizenship of South Ossetia.

== Chief Sanitary Inspector ==
From 1996 to 2013 Onishchenko was the Chief State Sanitary Doctor of Russia and ex officio First Deputy Minister of Health. Since 2004 he was the head of newly established Federal Service for Supervision of Consumer Rights Protection (Rospotrebnadzor).

During Onishchenko's 17-year-long tenure his department made numerous radical and controversial actions:

- In March 2006, Rospotrebnadzor completely banned the import of Georgian and Moldovan wines to Russia, motivating this step with the non-compliance of a significant part of them with sanitary standards. The Georgian government recognized the presence of a large mass of counterfeits on the Georgian wine market and initiated criminal cases against the management of a number of wineries. According to a VCIOM poll, 71% of the Russians supported the restrictions imposed by Onishchenko.
- Since June 2009, Rospotrebnadzor has banned the import of almost 500 types of dairy products from Belarus, and then another 800 due to the fact that Belarusian producers did not re-register documents in accordance with Russian technical regulations for milk. The Belarusian delegation did not attend the CSTO summit in Moscow on June 15, explaining their move by "economic discrimination" from one of the CSTO countries.
- In October 2012, speaking on the draft of a new anti-smoking legislation, Onishchenko said: "If our Duma would not accept the law that was introduced, I will raise the issue of its dissolution. As a voter, I have the right to say so." In response, member of the Duma from United Russia Andrey Makarov suggested "sending Mr. Onishchenko for a psychiatric examination."
- In July 2013, the head of Rospotrebnadzor announced a ban on the Ukrainian Roshen confectionery products to Russia. On July 29, Onishchenko said that the agency's suspicions were "justified", that the Roshen's products "did not correspond to the declared parameters", and there was also a complaint about the quality and safety of the goods.

On 22 October 2013, Deputy Prime Minister of Russia Olga Golodets, commenting on rumors about Onishchenko's resignation, said: "Gennady Onishchenko's term as head of Rospotrebnadzor has expired, so he is leaving this post. Deputy Head of Rospotrebnadzor Anna Popova will be appointed the new head of the department." Later that day, Onishchenko refused to confirm information about his resignation, calling Golodets "a strange person" who "does not belong to the number of decision-makers." On the evening of October 23, Gennady Onishchenko was officially dismissed from his post as head of Rospotrebnadzor and appointed assistant to the Prime Minister of Russia Dmitry Medvedev. The reason for the resignation of Onishchenko, according to one of the government officials, was the "problem of controlling him."

== Member of parliament ==
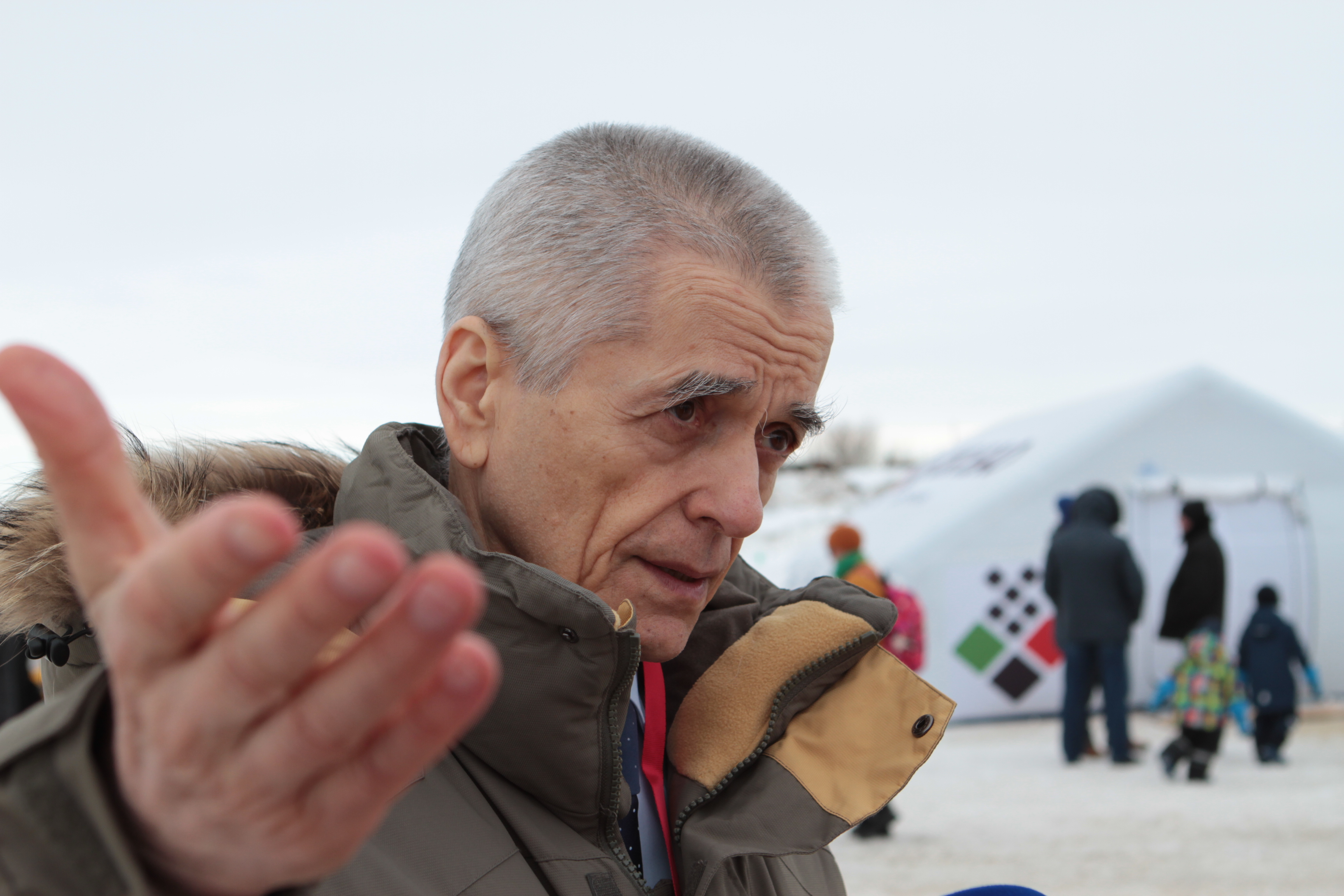
Gennady Onishchenko in Naryan-Mar at Artur Chilingarov's snowmobile races, 2017

On 22 May 2016, Onishchenko won United Russia's primaries in Tushino constituency No. 206 in Moscow. Two days later, the prime minister Dmitry Medvedev removed the reprimand imposed on Onishchenko in February "for violating the requirements of article 18 of the Law on the state civil service." When submitting the declaration, Onishchenko did not mention the residential building in Moscow Oblast.

On 18 September 2016 he was elected member of the 7th State Duma He became first deputy Chairman of the Committee on Education and Science in the new Duma convocation.

In July 2017, Onishchenko proposed to ban fidget spinners in Russia. In April 2018 he became one of the initiators of the bill "On measures of counteraction on unfriendly actions of the USA and (or) other foreign states" in the article 2 of which it was proposed to ban or restrict the import of drugs produced in the United States or other foreign countries. The project law was criticized by a number of public organizations, the Federation Council committee on social policy and State Duma committee on foreign affairs.

== Personal life ==
Onishchenko has three children, one daughter and two sons.
