= Jeanne Guillemin =

American anthropologist (1943–2019)

- Born: March 6, 1943
- Died: November 15, 2019 (76)
- Other names: Harley
- Citizenship: American
- Education: Harvard University (bachelor's degree) 1968, Brandeis University (PhD) 1973
- Occupations: Medical anthropologist, and Author
- Years active: 1972 - 2005
- Employer: Boston College
- Known for: An authority on biological weapons
- Notable work: Established an endowed fund to provide financial support to female PhD candidates studying international affairs

Jeanne Harley Guillemin (March 6, 1943 - November 15, 2019) was an American medical anthropologist and author, who for 25 years taught at Boston College as a professor of Sociology and for over ten years was a senior fellow in the Security Studies Program at Massachusetts Institute of Technology. She was an authority on biological weapons and published four books on the topic.

== Biography ==
Born (March 6, 1943) Jean Elizabeth Garrigan in Brooklyn, New York City, she was raised in Rutherford, New Jersey and received a bachelor's degree (1968) in social psychology from Harvard University. In 1973, she completed a PhD in sociology and anthropology at Brandeis University. She taught at Boston College from 1972 until 2005.

While at Boston College, Guillemin did extensive research on hospital technology and medical ethics, receiving fellowships to work on the U.S. Senate Finance Committee staff and at the Hastings Center for the Study of Ethics. She was also co-head of the National Library of Medicine's HealthAware Project, a joint project with Harvard Medical School to test how the internet could be used to educate people about preventive health measures.

She married Robert Guillemin and had two sons, Robert and John. She divorced her first husband and in 1986, married Matthew Meselson.

In the 1980s, Guillemin became interested in the misuse of biomedical science by government weapons programs. She involved herself in two of her husband's investigations of alleged violations of international arms control agreements by the Soviet Union which involved germ weapons. The first was the "yellow rain" accusation by the United States against the USSR, to the effect that the Soviets enabled the Laotian army to use deadly mycotoxins to attack Hmong refugees allied with the US during the Vietnam War. This accusation had been disputed by Meselson in 1983 when he argued that the yellow material was actually bee feces mistaken for a biological weapon by those under attack and by certain US government scientists. (The issue remains disputed and the US government has not withdrawn the allegations, arguing that the controversy has not been fully resolved.)

In 1992, Guillemin became part of Meselson's investigation into another Cold War controversy, the 1979 outbreak of anthrax in Sverdlovsk, a closed Soviet city in the Ural Mountains. The Soviet government claimed the cause was infected meat. Guillemin's interviews with the families of victims (64 people were recorded as dying) resulted in an epidemiological map showing the source to be an air-borne release of anthrax spores from a military facility where, in violation of the 1972 Biological Weapons Convention, the testing of anthrax weapons had been in process. In 1994, the results of this research were published in Science and in 1999 her book on this research was published (Anthrax: The Investigation of a Deadly Outbreak, U of California Press).

After 9/11, with the advent of the anthrax letter attacks, Guillemin was frequently asked by the media to explain the disease, based on her experience in Russia. In 2005 she published Biological Weapons: From State-sponsored Programs to Contemporary Bioterorism, Columbia U Press) which offers a concise, comprehensive history of how anthrax and other microbes were developed as weapons over the course of the 20th century, resulting in potential bioterrorism. She turned her attention to the 2001 anthrax letter attacks after the 2008 suicide of the FBI's prime suspect, an anthrax scientist who worked for the U.S. Army at Fort Detrick, Maryland. Her third book on biological weapons is about the letters and their impact on victims and government organizations. It is called American Anthrax: Fear, Crime, and the Investigation of the Nation's Deadliest Bioterror Attack, (Macmillan/Holt/Times, 2011).

Guillemin joined the MIT Center for International Studies in 2006 as a research associate and senior advisor. In October 2019, she established an endowed fund to provide financial support to female PhD candidates studying international affairs.

Guillemin died on November 15, 2019, at the age of 76.

== Books ==
- Guillemin, Jeanne, Urban Renegades: The Cultural Strategy of American Indians, Columbia University Press, 19?? (New edition, 1975).
- Guillemin, Jeanne Harley and Lynda Lytle Holmstrom, Mixed Blessings: Intensive Care for Newborns, Oxford University Press, 1986.
- Guillemin, Jeanne, Anthrax: The Investigation of a Deadly Outbreak, Berkeley, University of California Press, 1999.
- Guillemin, Jeanne, Anthrax and Smallpox: Comparison of Two Outbreaks, National Technical Information Service, 2002.
- Guillemin, Jeanne, Biological Weapons: From the Invention of State-sponsored Programs to Contemporary Bioterrorism, Columbia University Press, 2005.
- Guillemin, Jeanne, American Anthrax, Henry Holt and Company, LLC, 2011.
- Guillemin, Jeanne, Hidden Atrocities: Japanese Germ Warfare and American Obstruction of Justice at the Tokyo Trial, Columbia University Press, 2017.

Guillemin wrote introductions to new editions of:

- Mead, Margaret, Kinship in the Admiralty Islands, In Anthropological Papers of the American Museum of Natural History, Volume 34, Issue 2 pages 181–358; American Museum of Natural History ( AMNH ), New York, 1934 [Transaction Publishers edition, 2001].
- Brown, Fredric Joseph, Chemical Warfare: A Study in Restraints, Princeton University Press, 1968; [Transaction Publishers edition, 2005].

Guillemin edited:

- Guillemin, Jeanne (ed.), Anthropological Realities: Readings in the Science of Culture, Transaction Publishers, 1980.
