= Irkutsk Anti-Plague Institute =

Russian anti-epidemic research institute

Irkutsk Anti-Plague Research Institute of Siberia and the Far East
- Иркутский научно-исследовательский противочумный институт Сибири и Дальнего Востока
- Founded: June 5, 1934 (laboratory predecessor, 1923)
- Founder: Aleksey Skorodumov
- Type: Research institute
- Headquarters: 78 Trilisser Street, Irkutsk, Russia
- Key people: Sergei Balakhonov (director)
- Website: irknipchi.ru

The Irkutsk Anti-Plague Research Institute of Siberia and the Far East (Russian: Иркутский научно-исследовательский противочумный институт Сибири и Дальнего Востока) is a Russian microbiological and anti-epidemic research institute in Irkutsk. It was established in 1934, from a laboratory founded in 1923, as the scientific and operational centre of the Soviet anti-plague system for Siberia and the Far East. It is one of Russia's specialised anti-plague institutes and operates under Rospotrebnadzor. Its stated work covers surveillance, diagnosis, and control of plague and other particularly dangerous infections, including cholera, brucellosis, tularemia, and anthrax.

== History ==
A plague laboratory was established in Irkutsk in 1923 during an outbreak in Transbaikal, a natural plague zone. Bacteriologist Aleksey Mikhailovich Skorodumov, sent from Petrograd, headed the laboratory.

On June 5, 1934, by Order No. 1 of the Authorised Council of Labour and Defence of the USSR, the laboratory was reorganised as the Irkutsk State Anti-Plague Institute, known as "Chumin," a scientific and operational body for plague control. Skorodumov became its first director. On his initiative the Siberian and Far Eastern anti-plague system was organised around the institute, with stations in Chita and Khabarovsk, anti-plague departments, and an anti-plague train. Skorodumov took part in work on outbreaks in Transbaikal, Mongolia, and China, and published Plague in Siberia (1937).

Skorodumov was arrested in 1937 during the Stalin-era purges, convicted on a charge later treated as false, and sentenced to death on April 14, 1939. He was rehabilitated posthumously in 1955. The institute was first housed in central Irkutsk. In 1939 it moved to a purpose-built complex on 3rd Sovetskaya Street, now Trilisser Street, then on the edge of the city.

In 1939 microbiologist Nikolai Akimovich Gaisky became deputy director for science. He organised work on tularemia and brucellosis and on production of bacterial preparations, and is credited as one of the developers of a live attenuated tularemia vaccine. He worked at the institute until 1947 and was buried on its grounds. During the Second World War the institute produced preventive preparations, including plague-related products and a cholera vaccine, and supported anti-epidemic work in Siberia, the Far East, and Mongolia.

In 1984 the institute was awarded the Order of the Red Banner of Labour.

A 1999 study by the James Martin Center for Nonproliferation Studies, summarised by ThePrint, described the Soviet anti-plague institutes as civilian epidemiological bodies without direct links to the Ministry of Defence or the main facilities of the Biopreparat biological programme, while noting that scientists and senior staff sometimes moved between civilian anti-plague institutes and other Soviet biological programs.

=== List of Directors ===
- F. F. Bugaychuk (1938–1940)
- V. N. Ter-Vartanov (1940–1941)
- N. I. Makarov (1941–1945)
- N. T. Bykov (1945–1948)
- N. D. Altareva (1948–1957)
- I. V. Domaradsky (1957–1964)
- M. I. Antsiferov (1964–1965)
- A. D. Safonova (1965–1978)
- E. P. Golubinsky (1978–2008)
- Sergei Vladimirovich Balakhonov (2008–present)

== Incidents ==
=== 2026 death of a laboratory worker ===
On September 29, 2026, laboratory technician Darya Shipilova (also transliterated Shpilova), aged 28, was hospitalised in Shelekhov, Irkutsk Oblast, with severe pneumonia. She died in the early hours of October 2, 2026. Independent regional reporting, cited by Radio Free Europe/Radio Liberty and others, said she had broken a test tube containing Yersinia pestis (pneumonic-plague bacteria) on September 25. Russian authorities did not confirm that account.

Rospotrebnadzor said Shipilova had been diagnosed with pneumonia of undetermined etiology, that expanded testing did not find microorganisms linked to her work, and that commissions examining biosafety at the institute found no accident involving pathogenic microorganisms. The agency said the sanitary situation in Irkutsk Oblast, Irkutsk, and Shelekhov was stable. The World Health Organization said Russian officials had informed it that no case of plague had been recorded in Irkutsk. Deutsche Welle assessed claims of a plague leak as unproven.

About 200 contacts were placed under medical observation, and quarantines were reported at hospitals in the region. Independent sources told Radio Free Europe/Radio Liberty that institute staff had been confined to the building from October 2 while awaiting test results. The head of neighbouring Buryatia, Alexey Tsydenov, initially said the employee had died "possibly from the plague," and later qualified the statement; he said Buryatia had no plague outbreaks.

The incident received widespread coverage outside Russia and prompted several countries to issue travel warnings and implement controls at national entry points.
