= Shelekhov =

Town in Irkutsk Oblast, Russia

Shelekhov Шелехов
- Town
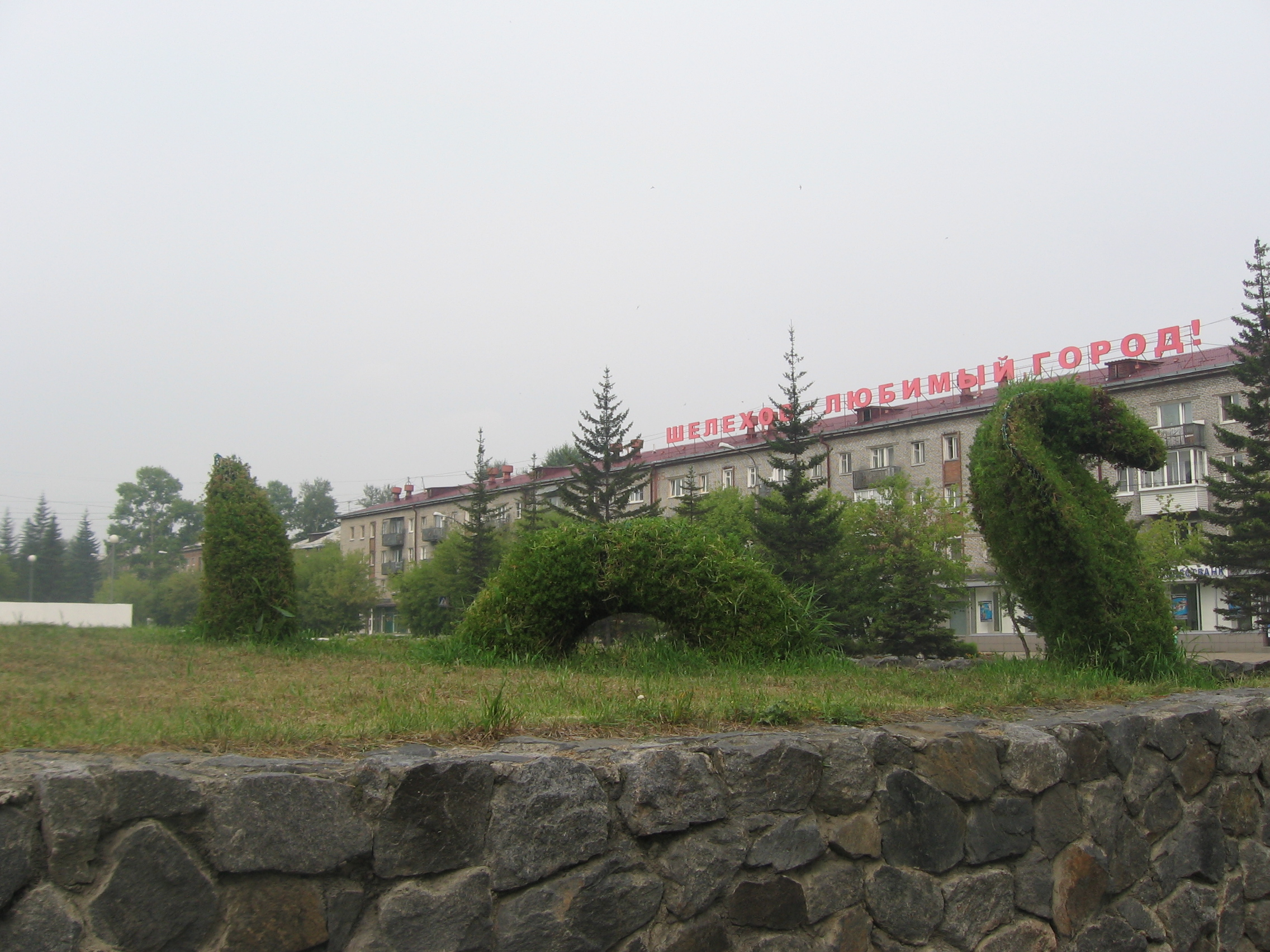
- In Shelekhov

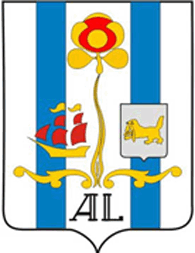
- Coat of arms
- Interactive map of Shelekhov
- Location of Shelekhov Shelekhov (Irkutsk Oblast)
- Coordinates: 52°12′36″N 104°5′51″E
- Country: Russia
- Federal subject: Irkutsk Oblast
- Administrative district: Shelekhovsky District
- Founded: May 1953
- Town status since: 1962

Government
  - Head: Valery Desyatov
- Elevation: 460 m (1,510 ft)

Population (2010 Census)
  - Total: 47,943
  - Estimate (2021): 41,998 (−12.4%)

Administrative status
  - Capital of: Shelekhovsky District

Municipal status
  - Municipal district: Shelekhovsky Municipal District
  - Urban settlement: Shelekhovskoye Urban Settlement
  - Capital of: Shelekhovsky Municipal District, Shelekhovskoye Urban Settlement
- Time zone: UTC+8 (MSK+5)
- Postal code: 666031–666037
- Dialing code: +7 39550
- OKTMO ID: 25655101001

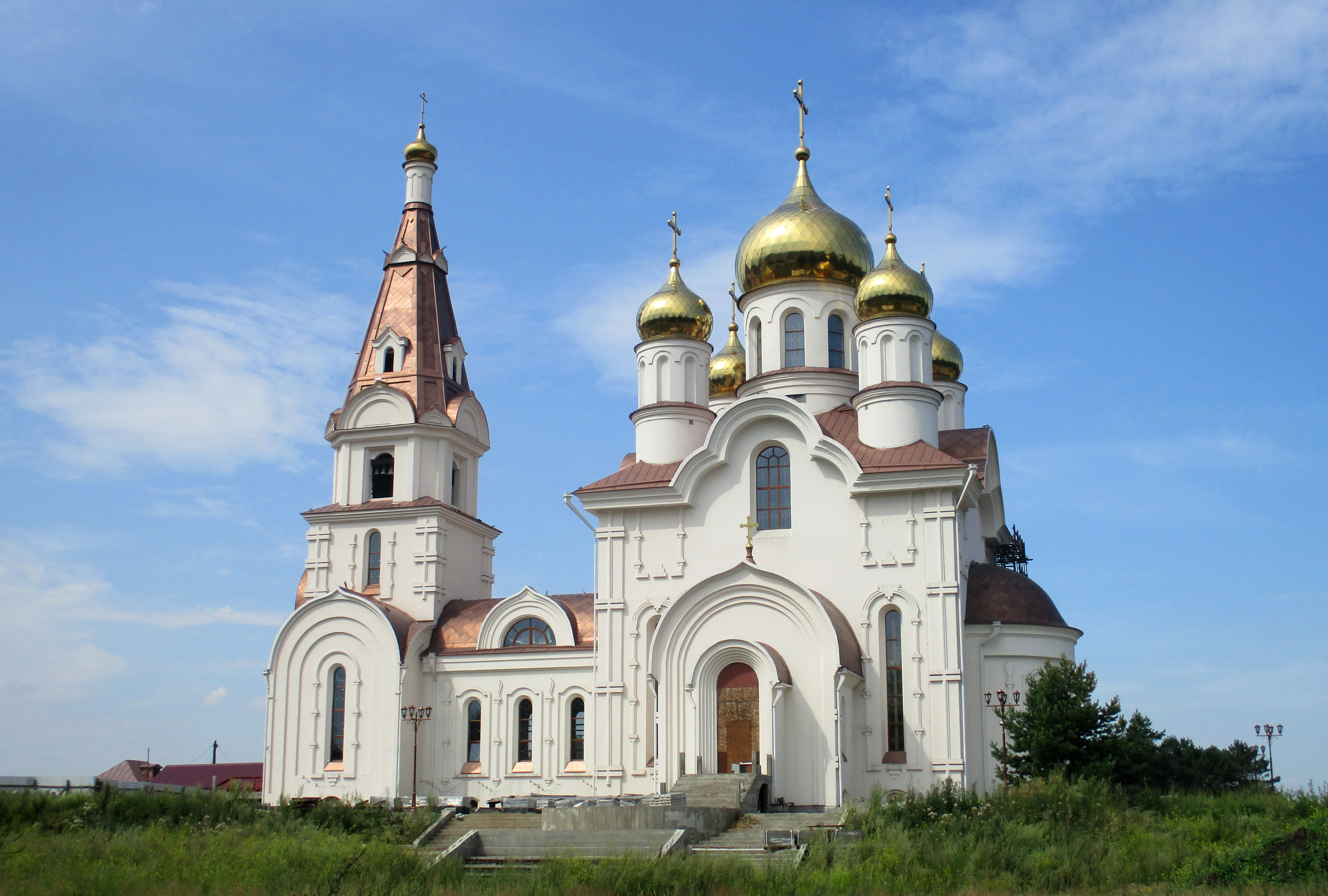
Cathedral of Sts. Peter and Paul in Shelekhov

Shelekhov (Russian: Шелехов, IPA: [ˈʂelʲɪxəf]) is a town and the administrative center of Shelekhovsky District in Irkutsk Oblast, Russia, located 20 kilometers (12 mi) southwest of Irkutsk, the administrative center of the oblast. It is located on the plains between the rivers Irkut and Olha. The official day of the city is celebrated on July 12.

== History ==
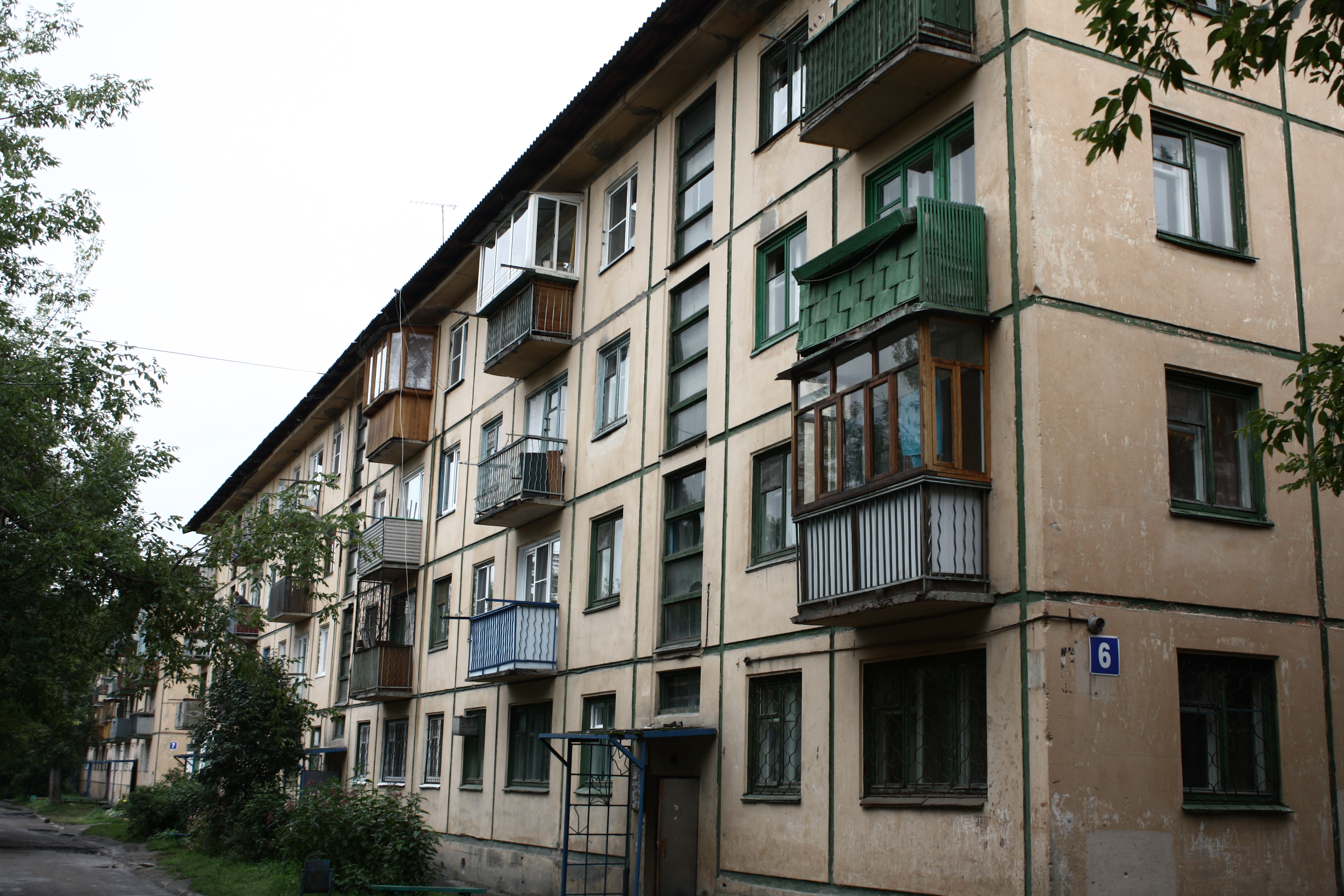
Example of dwelling housing in Block No3.

=== Etymology ===
In 1956, it was named Shelekhov honoring a Russian explorer Grigory Shelikhov. The name of the city is spelled differently from the surname of the explorer as Grigory himself used two different signatures with both spelling variants of his surname. In 1962, Shelekhov was granted town status.

=== Development ===
The city was founded in May 1953 when the first construction workers of the Irkutsk Aluminum Smelter had installed the first six housing tents. In memory of these first construction workers, a monument of concrete in the form of tents referred to as "The First Tent" was erected near the administrative building of the plant. However, this year mostly symbolizes first mention of an actual inhabited area as the settlement was then called by the abbreviation of the aluminum plant- IrkAZ, and not Shelekhov.

According to Giprogor Russian Institute of Urban and Investment Development, a Russian urban planning and investment company, it was initially planned to create a city with a population of 100,000 people. The first inhabitants were the people of the villages Olkha, Markovo, Vvedenschina and the settlement of Bolshoj Lug.

On March 30, 1954, the commission adopted a temporary construction scheme of dwelling houses. In autumn a film projector was launched that held regular movie showings. In October the first ten members of the Komsomol had arrived for the construction of the Irkutsk Aluminum Smelter. By the end of the year 2148m² of living space was commissioned.

Initially, the residential buildings were planned to be divided into different blocks. However currently, the city is represented by several blocks and residential areas.

By the end of 1955 the construction site and the settlement received permanent electric lighting from the grid. In June 1956 the first workers of the Orel Komsomol arrived on train to the site. Over a thousand people were initially housed in a tent city near Kultuk. Given the increase in demand, the first kindergarten was opened on September 15, 1955, and the first high school was opened by the end of 1956.

=== 2026 plague incident ===
On September 25, 2026, 28-year-old laboratory assistant Darya Shipilova of the Irkutsk Anti-Plague Institute accidentally broke a test tube containing Yersinia pestis. Shipilova's condition worsened on September 27; she was admitted to the Shelekhov district hospital on either September 29 or October 1, and she died inside the hospital's intensive care unit on October 2. Reports also state that 200 people have been quarantined at a local hospital. The incident received widespread coverage outside Russia and prompted several countries to issue travel warnings and implement controls at national entry points.

== Administrative and municipal status ==
Within the framework of administrative divisions, Shelekhov serves as the administrative center of Shelekhovsky District, to which it is directly subordinated. As a municipal division, the town of Shelekhov is incorporated within Shelekhovsky Municipal District as Shelekhovskoye Urban Settlement.

== Sports ==
The Canada-United States match of the 2012 Women's Bandy World Championship was played in Shelekhov. Irkutsk was awarded the 2014 World Championship for men and some of the matches were played in Shelekhov, at the Stroitel Stadium. The town hosted two matches at the 2017 Girls-17 World Championship.

== International relations ==
=== Twin towns and sister cities ===
Shelekhov is twinned with:

- Nomi, Japan
- Rylsk, Russia
