= 2021 French moratorium on prion research =

Three-month research moratorium on prions

The 2021 French moratorium on prion research was a three-month moratorium on research on prions in France. The moratorium was announced in July 2021 by several public research institutions after a retired lab worker was diagnosed with variant Creutzfeldt–Jakob disease and came two years after the death of Émilie Jaumain from the same disease after acquiring it in a lab accident.

== 2010 incident ==
In May 2010, Émilie Jaumain, a 24 year-old scientist working in the virology and molecular immunology unit of the French National Institute of Agricultural Research (Institut national de la recherche agronomique, INRAE) in Jouy-en-Josas, accidentally pricked her thumb on a pair of forceps while cleaning a cryostat which stored the frozen brains of transgenic mice that overexpressed human prion protein. Despite wearing a double pair of latex gloves, the forceps cut her skin.

In 2017, Jaumain began experiencing a number of neurological symptoms. In early 2019, she was diagnosed with variant Creutzfeldt–Jakob disease, caused by prions. Three months after her diagnosis and less than a decade after the accident, she died. A 2020 paper in the New England Journal of Medicine that reviewed her case found that "percutaneous exposure to prion-contaminated material is plausible in this patient" and that there was a "need for improvements in the prevention of transmission of variant CJD and other prions that can affect humans in the laboratory and neurosurgery settings."

After her death, Jaumain's family announced that they would be suing INRAE for negligence and manslaughter. The lawsuit alleged that she had not received proper training for handling prions, that she had not been supplied with cut-resistant gloves, and that there was a delay of twenty minutes for her to receive decontamination care for her injury. A 2020 government inspection on safety conditions in prion research in France found that labs in France conformed to safety regulations, but that there was room to improve. The report further found that at least 17 lab accidents had been recorded in the last decade, of which five involved researchers being cut with contaminated blades and at least one of which occurred in the same lab where Jaumain worked in 2005 (although the researcher has not developed any symptoms). A number of labs across France introduced more stringent safety rules after Jaumain's diagnosis, including switching to plastic scalpels. However, the seven recommendations made in the report to improve security have gone largely unheeded in the laboratory where Emilie Jaumain was infected.

In April 2020, the Association EMILYS was founded to lobby for better health and safety regulations in research. In June 2021, INRAE chair Philippe Mauguin wrote a letter to the Association EMILYS stating that "we recognize, without ambiguity, the hypothesis of a correlation between Emilie Jaumain-Houel's accident... and her infection with vCJD." However, it was not until March 2022 that this causal link was finally officially recognized by the institute, after a second death, intense media and activist coverage, and nearly two years after the publication of the case report in the NEJM, which deemed the probability of contamination by other means to be "negligible or nonexistent".

As of 2023, the institute where these two research technicians were infected does not acknowledge the safety breaches that led to these tragedies.

== 2021 moratorium ==
In July 2021, it was announced that a second lab worker in France had been diagnosed with Creutzfeldt–Jakob disease. In response, five public research institutions in France announced a three-month moratorium on prion research. The statement, backed by the French government, was signed by Inserm, INRAE, French National Centre for Scientific Research, French Alternative Energies and Atomic Energy Commission, and the Agence nationale de sécurité sanitaire de l'alimentation, de l'environnement et du travail.

This moratorium was lifted in September 2022 in INRAE's prion research laboratories, where two research technicians had been infected at work, while it remained in place in other institutes. Serious doubts remain about the safety of staff and the ability and willingness of the ministries responsible for this institute to ensure that safety. The concern of the scientific technical community is heightened by the death of a Spanish prion researcher from Creutzfeldt-Jakob disease, revealed by El País after months of opacity on the part of the university where he had worked and exposed staff to this risk.

== See also ==
- List of laboratory biosecurity incidents
