= Sverdlovsk anthrax leak =

1979 anthrax outbreak in the Soviet Union

On 2 April 1979, an accidental release of spores of Bacillus anthracis (the causative agent of anthrax) is reported to have started an outbreak of the disease which resulted in the deaths of at least 68 people. Soviet authorities contemporaneously maintained that the illness was due to consumption of tainted meat in the area, with butchers' subcutaneous exposure being indicative of a tainted meat origin. The purported accident became the earliest chronological event cited in the Western world as evidence of the Soviet Union hosting a programme aimed at the production of biological weapons.

== Background ==
Sverdlovsk had been a major production center of the Soviet military-industrial complex since World War II. By the 1970s, 87 percent of the city's industrial production was military; only 13 percent for public consumption. It produced tanks, ballistic missiles, rockets, and other armaments. The city has at times been referred to as Russia's Pittsburgh because of its large steelmaking industry. During the Cold War, Sverdlovsk became a Soviet "closed city" to which travel was restricted for foreigners.

The biological warfare (BW) facility in Sverdlovsk was built during the period 1947 to 1949 and was a spin-off of the Soviet Union's main military BW facility in Kirov. It was allocated the former site of the Cherkassk-Sverdlovsk Infantry Academy in Sverdlovsk on Ulitsa Zvezdnaya, 1, and abutted the southern industrialised sector of the city. The new facility, known as the USSR Ministry of Defence's Scientific-Research Institute of Hygiene, became operational on 19 July 1949. Alibek suggests that the construction of the institute incorporated technical knowledge which had been extracted from captured Japanese scientists who had participated in the Japanese biological warfare programme. Research was initiated at Sverdlovsk on bacterial pathogens including Bacillus anthracis. In 1951, a programme was launched which focussed on botulinum toxin. Later in the 1970s, interest in the latter ceased and there was a major shift in focus to B. anthracis. In 1974, the facility was re-named as the Scientific-Research Institute of Bacterial Vaccine Preparations.

The BW facility at Sverdlovsk was located within a military base known as Compound 19 (19th gorodok, Russian:19-й городок) which itself was created between 1947 and 1949. Compound 19 abutted the southern industrialised sector of the city in the Chkalovskii district. It was located immediately adjacent to the Vtorchermet housing estate. A meat-processing plant was located nearby with a view to supplying components of bacterial nutrient media. There was a high degree of autonomy with regard to the secret base. As well as the military institute, Compound 19 embraced its own 75-bed military hospital, a postal service, a range of shops, a kindergarten, schools, a social club, a sports stadium, parks and walkways, a civil registry office, and its own special prosecutor's office. Sentries and construction workers at the site required special security clearance. A Russian television crew visited the site shortly after the collapse of the USSR. It is likely that much of what they observed may not have been greatly different from the situation in 1979. They reported that Compound 19 comprised around 200 hectares and was sub-divided into three main zones. The first, residential zone, housed the scientists and their families, around 7,000 inhabitants, along with the ancillary services described above. Nestled within the outer zone there was a check-point which provided restricted access to a so-called industrial zone. At the very heart of Compound 19, guarded by a final check-point and barbed wire, was the most secret special working zone which housed the main administration building together with secret laboratories and production units housed underground.

During the 1960s, Compound 32, an army base with barracks and apartments for Soviet soldiers serving in armoured and artillery units, and with no connection to BW, was added to the southern edge of Compound 19.

== Accident ==
In a Harvard University Press account, Leitenberg and Zilinskas with Kuhn report that, at some point during the period 2–3 April 1979, B. anthracis spores were released from a four-story building located in a Soviet Armed Forces research facility near the city of Sverdlovsk in the Soviet Union, referred to as Compound 19's special zone. The building is said to have housed a production unit which produced dry B. anthracis spores for weapons use. The spores could have created a plume which the wind carried over parts of Sverdlovsk itself as well as a number of rural villages. Russian sources indicate that the release occurred as a result of a defect in an air-handling system which carried exhaust from a spray dryer. The release, according to one Russian source, took place during the evening or night of 2–3 April. Based on interviews with friends and families of victims, together with a study of wind data, Meselson and his investigative team conclude that the release probably took place during the day of 2 April.

The estimated fatalities associated with the military leakage of anthrax spores is not precisely known. Meselson's group reports that the incident led directly to the deaths of at least 68 people in Sverdlovsk itself and to cases of animal anthrax in nearby villages (Rudnii, Bol'shoe Sedelnikovo, Maloe Sedelnikovo, Pervomaiskii, Kashino and Abramovo) to the south-east of the city. Leitenberg and Zilinskas with Kuhn quote a Russian source which indicates that "According to the official data, 95 people were infected, 68 (71.5 per cent) died [but] actually the number of the dead and infected was larger". The leakage of anthrax hit the ceramics factory, south of Compound 19, the hardest. The factory, which employed 2,180 personnel, was in possession of a ventilation system which sucked air from the outside, directing some to the furnaces with the remainder being directed to the workforce. In the following weeks at least 18 workers at the factory died.

In response to the incident, the Soviet authorities acted to mobilise medical teams in the affected district. Tetracycline was administered to affected households, sick rooms were disinfected and potentially contaminated sheets and clothing were collected. Checks for illness in family members were made. Individuals who had fevers were directed to polyclinics and those who were very ill were transferred to the local Hospital 40. A Moscow-controlled Extraordinary Commission was eventually established to manage the response and on the 22 April firemen and factory workers began hosing down buildings with solutions of chlorine. The large-scale vaccination of the population in the affected Chkalovskii district was also undertaken by the authorities. In all, some 80 per cent of around 59,000 eligible individuals were injected with the Soviet STI anthrax vaccine. The latter had been manufactured by the Scientific-Research Institute of Vaccines and Sera based in Tbilisi, Georgia. The first indication in the West of the accident in Sverdlovsk was a story which appeared in January 1980 in an obscure Frankfurt-based magazine named Possev which was published by a group of Russian emigres. It claimed that there had been an outbreak of anthrax in April 1979 in Sverdlovsk after an explosion at a military settlement south-west of the city.

In 1986, Matthew Meselson of Harvard University was granted approval by Soviet authorities for a four-day trip to Moscow where he interviewed several senior Soviet health officials about the outbreak. He later issued a report which agreed with the Soviet assessment that the outbreak was caused by a contaminated meat processing plant, concluding the Soviets' official explanation was completely "plausible and consistent with what is known from medical literature and recorded human experiences with anthrax". In October 1991, the Wall Street Journal's Moscow Bureau Chief, Peter Gumbel investigated the outbreak and others have reported that after interviewing numerous families, hospital workers and doctors, he found the Soviet version of events "riddled with inconsistencies, half-truths and plain falsehoods".

The post-Soviet Russian government maintains that the outbreak stemmed from food contamination. It has been reported that President Boris Yeltsin, who had been Sverdlovsk's Communist Party chief at the time of the accident, in May 1992 revealed that "our military development was the cause". However, what was thought to be an admission is a translator's footnote in the English version of Yeltsin's autobiography. Based on the reports in Western media at the time, a team of Western scientists led by Meselson gained access to the region in June 1992. Before they arrived they had been provided by the authorities with a list of 68 known incident victims in Sverdlovsk. By visiting and questioning in their homes surviving relatives of those who had died, the investigating researchers ascertained both where the victims had been living and where they had been during daylight hours at the time during which hospital admission records indicated a possible release into the atmosphere of anthrax dust. When the locations were plotted on maps, the places where the victims lived did not form a clear geographical pattern. However, there was a very precise indication from their reported locations during working hours, that all of the victims had been directly downwind at the time of the release of the spores via aerosol. Livestock in the area were also affected. Had the winds been blowing in the direction of the city at that time, it could have resulted in the pathogen being spread to hundreds of thousands of people. Meselson's original conclusion had been that the outbreak was a natural one and that the Soviet authorities were not lying when they disclaimed having an active offensive bio-warfare program. A subsequent conclusion by Meselson suggests that the accidental military leak is more likely.

== Aftermath ==
In April 1992, President Boris Yeltsin issued a decree On ensuring the implementation of international pledges in the sphere of biological weapons. Under the reforming president, there was a desire, over time, to shift the Ministry of Defence's BW institutes from military jurisdiction to work for the civil economy. It was against this background, that at some point between 1992 and 1994, a representative from the US investment bank and stock brokerage firm Paine Webber Incorporated, held a meeting with members of Russia's Committee on Convention Problems of Chemical and Biological Weapons which was specifically focused on the potential for cooperation with Compound No. 19 (Ekaterinburg) in the areas of infectious diseases in animals and production of veterinary vaccines.

Medical anthropologist Jeanne Guillemin, member of the 1992 expedition team and wife of Meselson, published a comprehensive book about the investigation in 1999, titled Anthrax – The Investigation of a Deadly Outbreak.

In August 2016, the journal Science reported that anthrax scientist Paul Keim of Northern Arizona University (Flagstaff) and colleagues had attempted to sequence the B. anthracis genome from two samples taken from victims of the Sverdlovsk anthrax leak. The samples had been preserved by local Russian pathologists who investigated the outbreak as it was occurring. Later, they shared the material with Professor Meselson during his investigative trip in 1992 (see above). The samples had been fixed in formalin and embedded in paraffin and the DNA was, as a result, badly degraded. Nevertheless, researchers were able to isolate the pathogen's DNA and piece together its entire genome, comparing it with hundreds of other anthrax isolates. Keim and his team reported that they had not found any genomic evidence that the Soviet military had attempted to grow an antibiotic- or vaccine-resistant strain or genetically engineered the strain in any way. Meselson commented that although this was a perfectly ordinary strain, "that doesn't mean it wasn't nasty. It was extracted from people who were killed by it."

Zilinskas and Mauger in 2018 provided the most up-to-date information regarding the current status of the Sverdlovsk military facility. Under the National System of Chemical and Biological Safety/Security of the Russian Federation, funding has been provided to the Sverdlovsk institute for the renovation of two facilities for the production of antibiotics. Such products could be used in the civil medical sector. Major reconstruction work has also been carried out with regard to a building that used to produce B. anthracis spores. A building used for media and substrate production has also been extensively renovated. Refurbishment has also been underway in recent years of an open-air test site—the so-called Pyshma field test base—for the Sverdlovsk institute. Once complete, it was intended to be used to "assess the effectiveness of means and methods of biological prospecting and the elimination of the consequences of emergency situations". As of late 2015, this refurbishment project remained incomplete.

In August 2020, the US Commerce Department's Bureau of Industry and Security (BIS) imposed "blacklist" restrictions on three Russian military biological institutes for their alleged involvement with the Russian biological weapons programme. One of these was the Sverdlovsk institute (now operating under the name 48th Central Scientific Research Institute, Yekaterinburg). On 2 March 2021, additional US sanctions were imposed on the 48 Central Scientific Research Institute Yekaterinburg (aka 48th TsNII Yekaterinburg) along with its associated military BW institutes in Kirov and Sergiev Posad.

== See also ==
- Soviet biological weapons program
- Biological warfare
- List of anthrax outbreaks
- List of laboratory biosecurity incidents
- Poison laboratory of the Soviet secret services
