= 1966 smallpox outbreak in the United Kingdom =

UK communicable disease incident

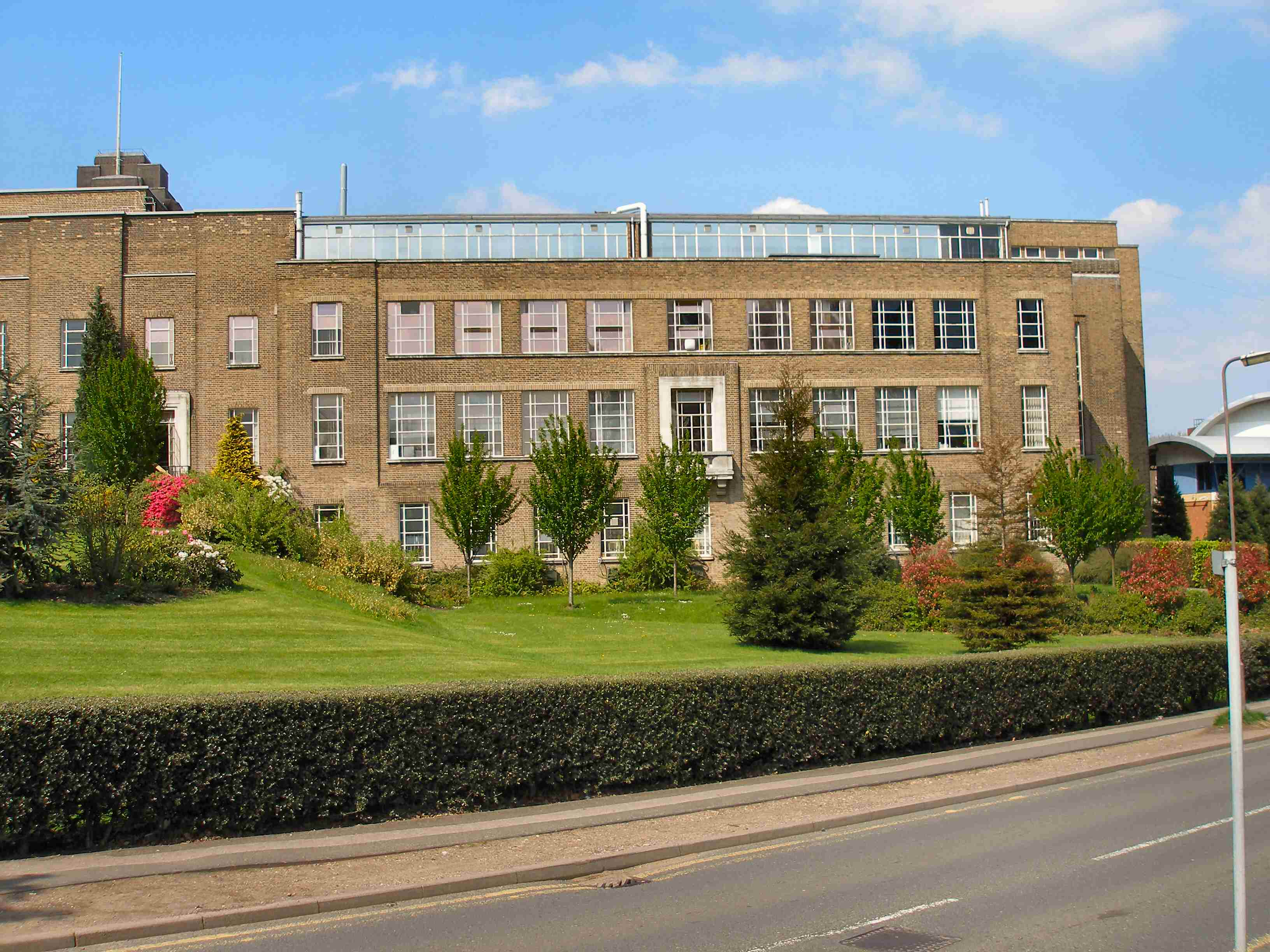
The East Wing of the University of Birmingham Medical School

The 1966 smallpox outbreak in the United Kingdom was an outbreak of mild smallpox which began with Tony McLennan, a photographer at the Medical School in Birmingham, which housed a smallpox laboratory and where 12 years later the last fatal smallpox outbreak would occur, also beginning with a medical photographer.
