= Anna Popova =

Russian physician and public health official (born 1960)

- Анна Попова
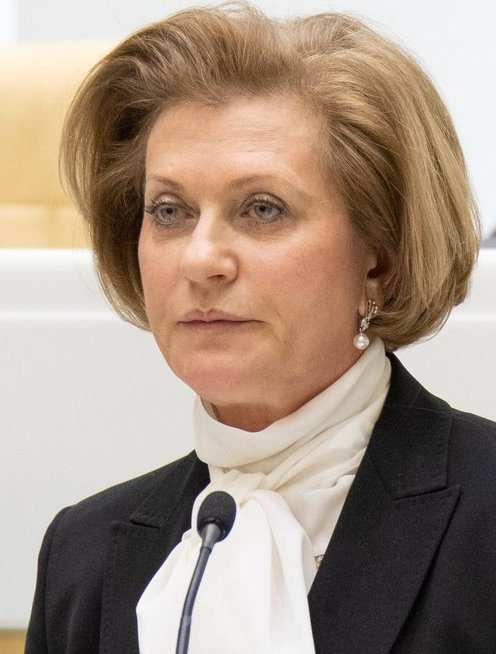
- Popova in 2019

Russian Chief Sanitary Doctor
- Incumbent
- Assumed office October 2013
- Prime Minister: Dmitry Medvedev; Mikhail Mishustin
- Preceded by: Gennady Onishchenko

Personal details
- Born: 18 October 1960 (age 66) Rostov-on-Don, Russian SFSR Soviet Union
- Education: Rostov State Medical University; Erisman Federal Scientific Center for Hygiene
- Profession: Educator

Anna Yuryevna Popova (Russian: Анна Юрьевна Попова; born 18 October 1960) is a Russian physician and public health official. She is serving as head of the Federal Service for Supervision of Consumer Rights Protection and Human Welfare, practically the Chief State Sanitary Doctor of the Russian Federation since 23 October 2013. She was acting State Advisor to the Russian Federation, Class 1 (2013), and is an epidemiologist, hygienist, MD, and professor.

She has the federal state civilian service rank of 1st class Active State Councillor of the Russian Federation.

== Biography ==
Anna Popova was born in Rostov-on-Don on October 18, 1960. In 1984 she graduated from Rostov State Medical University with a degree in hygiene, sanitation and epidemiology.

She worked as an epidemiologist, head of the epidemiological department of the Budyonnovsky sanitary and epidemiological station in the Stavropol Krai, then as an epidemiologist, chief physician of the Center for State Sanitary and Epidemiological Surveillance in Serpukhov, Moscow Oblast. From 1994 to 2005, she headed the sanitary and epidemiological service of the Serpukhov district of the Moscow Oblast.

From 2006 to 2008, she was the First Deputy Head of Rospotrebnadzor in the Moscow Oblast. In 2008, she was appointed head of the Personnel, Postgraduate Education and Hygienic Education Department of the Federal Service for Supervision of Consumer Rights Protection and Human Well-Being (Rospotrebnadzor). Since 23 December 2011, she served as Deputy Head of Rospotrebnadzor. Since 23 October 2013, she was Acting Head of Rospotrebnadzor (Order of 23 October 2013 No. 1931-p). On 10 April 2014, she was appointed the head of the department. She achieved the return of unscheduled inspections without prior warning of catering enterprises and supermarkets. The relevant authority Rospotrebnadzor received from 23 January 2015.

In 2013, she was awarded the class rank of State Class Counselor of the Russian Federation, Class 1.

On 14 October 2014, she signed the Decree of the Chief State Sanitary Doctor of the Russian Federation N 65 "On establishing the size of the sanitary protection zone of the Shirokorechenskoye cemetery in the city of Yekaterinburg, Sverdlovsk Oblast" (registered with the Ministry of Justice of the Russian Federation on 12 November 2014, registration No. 34665) resetting the borders of the existing Shirokorechensky cemetery of hazard class II from 500 meters to 0 meters, from the side of the Shopping and entertainment center "RAINBOW PARK", based on the data presented to it on the presence of "noise and dust" from a biology source biological and bacteriological hazards.

=== Academics ===
In 1997, she defended her thesis on "The effect of environmental pollution by chlorinated biphenyls on non-specific resistance and post-vaccination immunity" at the F. F. Erisman Research Institute of Hygiene (Russian: Федеральный научный центр гигиены имени Ф. Ф. Эрисмана).

In 2000, she defended her doctoral dissertation on the topic "Hygienic safety of the population under environmental pollution by chlorinated biphenyls using the model territory as an example".

In 2005, she was awarded the title of professor in the specialty "Hygiene". She is the Head of the Department of Social Hygiene and Organization of the State Sanitary and Epidemiological Service RMAPO (Russian: Российская медицинская академия непрерывного профессионального образования). She teaches the discipline "General Hygiene" at the Department of Hygiene in First Moscow State Medical University. She is the editor-in-chief of the monthly scientific and practical journal "Public Health and the Environment - ZNiSO". She is the author and co-author of more than 70 scientific papers, two monographs, more than 50 normative and methodological documents.

=== COVID-19 ===
Her organisation is responsible for the Russian response to the COVID-19 pandemic in Russia. On 28 April 2020 she provided a presidential update on how the virus had been controlled, along with testing, rates of infection and the requirement to observe lockdown.
