= Malcolm Casadaban =

American scientist

Malcolm John Casadaban
- Born: August 12, 1949; New Orleans, Louisiana, United States
- Died: September 13, 2009 (aged 60); Chicago, Illinois, United States
- Education: Massachusetts Institute of Technology; Harvard Medical School
- Occupations: Genetic and Cell Biology Professor
- Known for: Death caused by plague

Malcolm Casadaban (12 August 1949 – 13 September 2009) was an American biologist who was associate professor of molecular genetics, cell biology, and microbiology at the University of Chicago. Casadaban died following an accidental laboratory exposure to an attenuated strain of Yersinia pestis, a bacterium that causes plague.

== Early life and education ==
Casadaban was born to John and Dolores Casadaban in New Orleans, Louisiana. He graduated with a degree in biology from the Massachusetts Institute of Technology in 1971. In 1976, he earned a PhD from Harvard Medical School in the laboratory of Jon Beckwith. He did a postdoctoral fellowship under Stanley Norman Cohen.

== Career ==
In his postdoctoral training, Casadaban began studying gene fusion, using novel methods for this technique.

Casadaban became an assistant professor at Chicago in 1980, and associate professor in 1985.

He had also been associated with Thermogen, a company he formed with two of his former graduate students in 1998, to commercialize his work with thermophilic bacteria. The company expanded to an annual revenue of about $2 million, but was sold to MediChem in 2000; this company, in turn, was later purchased by DeCODE Genetics.

He had 17 scientific publications cited over 100 times.

== Death ==
Casadaban died September 13, 2009, shortly after falling ill due to infection with an attenuated strain of Yersinia pestis, a bacterium that causes plague. It was not known exactly how he was exposed to the bacterium he studied in his laboratory.

According to a CDC report on the incident, the strain that killed Casadaban (KIM D27) had never been known to infect laboratory workers, as it was an attenuated strain that had defective genes for iron uptake. On autopsy, Casadaban was found to have undiagnosed hereditary hemochromatosis (iron overload), which likely played a role in his death.
