= List of anthrax outbreaks =

Update: latest outbreak of anthrax on Sept. 14, 2026 in Zambia. https://globalnews.ca/news/12058617/anthrax-outbreak-zambia-dead-animals/

This page lists notable outbreaks of anthrax, a disease of humans and other mammals caused by Bacillus anthracis, organized by year.

== Incidents ==
Incident	Date	Casualties	Description
Sverdlovsk anthrax leak	2 April 1979	Around 105 victims	On 2 April 1979, an outbreak of anthrax occurred in Sverdlovsk, USSR. The anthrax spores were accidentally released from a secret military facility. An official report stated that 68 people died during April and June. The victims died within a few weeks of exposure to the bacteria. 11 others survived. Traces of the leak were allegedly covered up by Soviet authorities. The Soviet Union strongly denied any involvement and blamed locals consuming infected meat, in fear of revealing Biological Weapons Convention violations. A leaflet campaign warned residents not to buy meat from unofficial markets. The cause of the incident was kept secret until the 1990s. Victims suffered from pulmonary anthrax but Soviet scientists claimed that it was gastrointestinal to support the claims that infected meat was responsible for the outbreak. Some journalists claimed that the death toll was as high as 100 victims.
1998 Russian Federation	June–July 1998	2 deaths 15 infected	A relatively small outbreak started in Russia after the consumption of meat from privately-raised cattle. All received treatment and officials reported the situation as under control by August 1998.
2001 anthrax attacks	18 September 2001	5 deaths 17 infected	In September 2001, letters containing anthrax spores were mailed to several news media offices and two U.S. Senators, killing five people and infecting 17 others. Of those infected, 11 developed cutaneous anthrax, while 11 developed inhalation anthrax. 20 of the 22 infected worked at a site where contaminated mail was handled or received. It is possible that Bruce Edwards Ivins was responsible for this incident. He was a doctor working on an anthrax vaccination for more than 20 years, which got pulled off the market. Federal investigators have suggested that he infected the mail with anthrax spores so the public would realize they need the anthrax vaccination. He later killed himself with a tylenol overdose before charges could be brought against him.
2014 anthrax outbreak	October 2014	7 deaths	In October 2014, an outbreak of gastrointestinal and skin anthrax in a village from India in the Simdega district, Jharkhand allegedly killed seven people. Indian government health personnel quarantined 30 houses as a result. Officials traced the anthrax spores to a cow and found that people who had touched the dead cow or eaten from it became infected. The Indian National Centre for Disease Control said at the time that the outbreak was one of the biggest in recent years in terms of deaths. Government officials sent samples of the suspected anthrax to a laboratory in Delhi for confirmation testing. People with the victims reported that the victims vomited blood and complained of chest and stomach aches. The Hindustan Times reported that village residents lynched a man who had treated some anthrax patients with herbs.
2016 anthrax outbreak	July 2016	1 human death (~100 infected) 2,300 animal deaths	In July 2016, nearly 100 people were hospitalized amid an anthrax outbreak among nomadic communities in northern Siberia, Russia and more than 2,300 reindeer died from anthrax infections in Yamalo-Nenets Autonomous Okrug. A 12-year-old child also died due to the outbreak. Scientists believe the melting unearthed the frozen carcass of a reindeer that died in a previous anthrax outbreak in 1968.
2018 anthrax outbreak	June 2018	Cattle farms affected in France	
2022–2023 Croatia outbreak	2022–2023	Several human cutaneous cases (0 deaths); 29 animal deaths	In Lonjsko Polje, Croatia, anthrax was confirmed in 29 animals (17 horses and 12 cattle). Several human cutaneous cases were recorded; all recovered.
2023 Minnesota outbreak	July 2023	No human cases; several animal deaths	First detection of anthrax in over a decade in Minnesota, confirmed in cattle and a horse in Kittson County.
2024 Odisha outbreak	May–June 2024	≥3 human cases (0 deaths)	Several confirmed human cases in Koraput district, Odisha, India, linked to infected cattle; livestock vaccination drives launched.
2024 Shandong outbreak	August 2024	5 human infections (0 deaths)	An outbreak occurred in Yanggu County, China; farm quarantined and all cattle culled. Five human cutaneous anthrax cases were confirmed.
2025 Virunga National Park outbreak	April 2025	No human deaths, 50+ animal deaths	Suspected anthrax outbreak in Virunga National Park, Democratic Republic of the Congo, killing around 50 hippopotamuses and other wildlife.
2025 Thailand outbreak	May 2025	4 human cases (1 death)	Cutaneous anthrax cases reported in Mukdahan Province, Thailand, linked to cattle slaughter and meat distribution.
