= 1971 Aral smallpox incident =

Smallpox outbreak from a Soviet bioweapon test

The Aral smallpox incident was a 30 July 1971 outbreak of the viral disease which occurred as a result of a field test at a Soviet biological weapons (BW) facility on an island in the Aral Sea. The incident sickened ten people, of whom three died, and came to widespread public notice only in 2002.

== Background ==
In 1954, an existing biological weapons test site originally constructed on Vozrozhdeniya Island in the Aral Sea in 1948 was greatly expanded by the Soviet Ministry of Defence, including to the neighboring Komsomolskiy Island, and named Aralsk-7. A field scientific research laboratory to conduct biological experiments was expanded, and the town of Kantubek was constructed to house employees and scientists. Bio-agents tested there included Bacillus anthracis, Coxiella burnetii, Francisella tularensis, Brucella suis, Rickettsia prowazekii, Variola major (smallpox), Yersinia pestis, botulinum toxin, and Venezuelan equine encephalitis virus. (By 1960, the Soviet biological weapons program also included numerous other research and operational facilities throughout the country.) Aralsk-7 had a history of association with mass deaths of fish, various regional plague outbreaks, a saiga antelope die-off, and individual cases of infectious disease among visitors to Vozrozhdeniya Island.

== The incident ==
According to Soviet General Pyotr Burgasov (Peter Burgasov), field testing of 400 grams of smallpox at Aralsk-7 caused an outbreak on 30 July 1971. Burgasov, former Chief Sanitary Physician of the USSR, former Soviet Vice-Minister of Health and a senior researcher within the Soviet BW program, described the incident:

On Vozrozhdeniya Island in the Aral Sea, the strongest recipes of smallpox were tested. Suddenly I was informed that there were mysterious cases of mortalities in Aralsk (Aral). A research ship [the Lev Berg] of the Aral fleet came to within 15 km of the island (it was forbidden to come any closer than 40 km). The lab technician of this ship took samples of plankton twice a day from the top deck. The smallpox formulation—400 gr. of which was exploded on the island—"got her" and she became infected. After returning home to Aralsk, she infected several people including children. All of them died. I suspected the reason for this and called the Chief of General Staff of Ministry of Defense and requested to forbid the stop of the Alma-Ata-Moscow train in Aralsk. As a result, the epidemic around the country was prevented. I called [future Soviet General Secretary Yuri] Andropov, who at that time was Chief of KGB, and informed him of the exclusive recipe of smallpox obtained on Vozrazhdenie Island.

There is a contending belief that the disease actually spread to the Lev Berg from Uyaly or Komsomolsk-on-Ustyurt, two cities in what is now Uzbekistan where the ship docked.

The incident caused ten individuals to contract smallpox and three unvaccinated individuals (a woman and two children) died from the haemorrhagic form of the disease. One crew member of the Lev Berg contracted smallpox as the ship passed within 15 km (9 miles) of the island. This crew member became ill on 6 August with fever, headache, and myalgia. The ship then landed in the port city of Aral on 11 August. The ill crew member returned to her home, and she developed a cough and temperature exceeding 38.9 °C (102 °F). Her physician prescribed antibiotics and aspirin. Although she was previously vaccinated for smallpox, a rash subsequently appeared on her back, face, and scalp; her fever subsided; and she recovered by 15 August. On 27 August this patient's 9-year-old brother developed a rash and fever, his pediatrician prescribed tetracycline and aspirin, and he recovered.

During the following three weeks, eight additional cases of fever and rash occurred in Aral. Five adults ranging in age from 23 to 60, and three children (4 and 9 months old, and a 5-year-old) were diagnosed with smallpox both clinically and by laboratory testing. These children and the 23-year-old were previously unvaccinated. The two youngest children and the 23-year-old subsequently developed the haemorrhagic form of smallpox and died. The remaining individuals had previously been vaccinated, and all recovered after having an attenuated form of the disease.

The high ratio of haemorrhagic smallpox cases in this outbreak, combined with the rate of infectivity and the testimony of General Burgasov, has led to the understanding that an enhanced weaponized strain of smallpox virus was released from Aralsk-7 in 1971.

== Response ==
A massive public health response to the smallpox cases in Aral ensued once the disease was recognized. In less than two weeks, approximately 50,000 residents of Aral were vaccinated. Household quarantine of potentially exposed individuals was enacted, and hundreds were isolated in a makeshift facility at the edge of the city. All traffic in and out of the city was stopped, and approximately 5.000 sq. meter (54.000 sq. ft.) of living space and 18 metric tons of household goods were incinerated by health officials.
