= Rospotrebnadzor =

Russian government agency

Federal Service for the Oversight of Consumer Protection and Welfare
- Федеральная служба по надзору в сфере защиты прав потребителей и благополучия человека
- Emblem of the Rospotrebnadzor

- Flag of the Rospotrebnadzor

Federal service overview
- Formed: March 12, 2004
- Jurisdiction: Prime Minister of Russia
- Headquarters: 18/5 and 7, Vadkovsky Lane, Moscow, 127994, Russia
- Employees: ~110,000
- Federal service executive: Anna Popova
- Website: www.rospotrebnadzor.ru

Rospotrebnadzor (Роспотребнадзор), officially the Federal Service for the Oversight of Consumer Protection and Welfare (Russian: Федеральная служба по надзору в сфере защиты прав потребителей и благополучия человека) is the national public health agency of the Russian Federation, and is the federal service responsible for the supervision of consumer rights protection and human wellbeing in Russia.

This service was founded in 2004, and was included in the structure of the Ministry of Health Care of Russia until 2012. In May 2012 Rospotrebnadzor was removed from the supervision of the Ministry of Health and now reports directly to the government of Russia. It functions on the authority of the Act of Federal Service on the base of the Administrative Regulation. The Vector Institute falls under Rospotrebnadzor.

== History ==
Medical and sanitary work in Russia originated at the beginning of the 19th century and was subordinated to the Medical Department of the Ministry of Police.

The organization's history goes back to the Decree of the Council of People's Commissars of the RSFSR "On the Sanitary Authorities of the Republic" dated 15 September 1922.

As of 2004, 2,218 separate sanitary-epidemiological stations (centers) were open in Russia.

It initially reported to the Ministry of Health. By 2004, the Rospotrebnadzor was under the direct oversight of the Government of Russia.

From 2004 until October 2013, it was headed by Gennady Onishchenko. The current head of the Rospotrebnadzor is Anna Popova.

The service currently employs approximately 110,000 professionals in its various bodies and organizations.

== Leadership ==
The organization is headed by the chief sanitary doctor of Russia.

№	Portrait	Director	Took office	Left office	Party
1		Evgeniy Belyaev	1990	October 25, 1996	Communist Party of the Soviet Union Constructive-Ecological Movement of Russia "Kedr"
2		Gennady Onishchenko	October 25, 1996	October 23, 2013	Constructive-Ecological Movement of Russia "Kedr" United Russia
3		Anna Popova	October 23, 2013	Present	Independents

== Responsibilities ==
The Rospotrebnadzor is responsible for performing the following functions:

- sanitary control and issuing permissive documents;
- licensing of certain kinds of activities;
- certification of different objects of evaluating of conformity to Russian legislation.
- sanitary certification of production according to the requirements of the Customs Union;
- state registration of production of the RF (excepting medicaments);
- state registration of production of the Customs Union on the territory of Russia (with the exception of pharmaceuticals).
