= Dora Lush =

Australian bacteriologist (1910 – 1943)

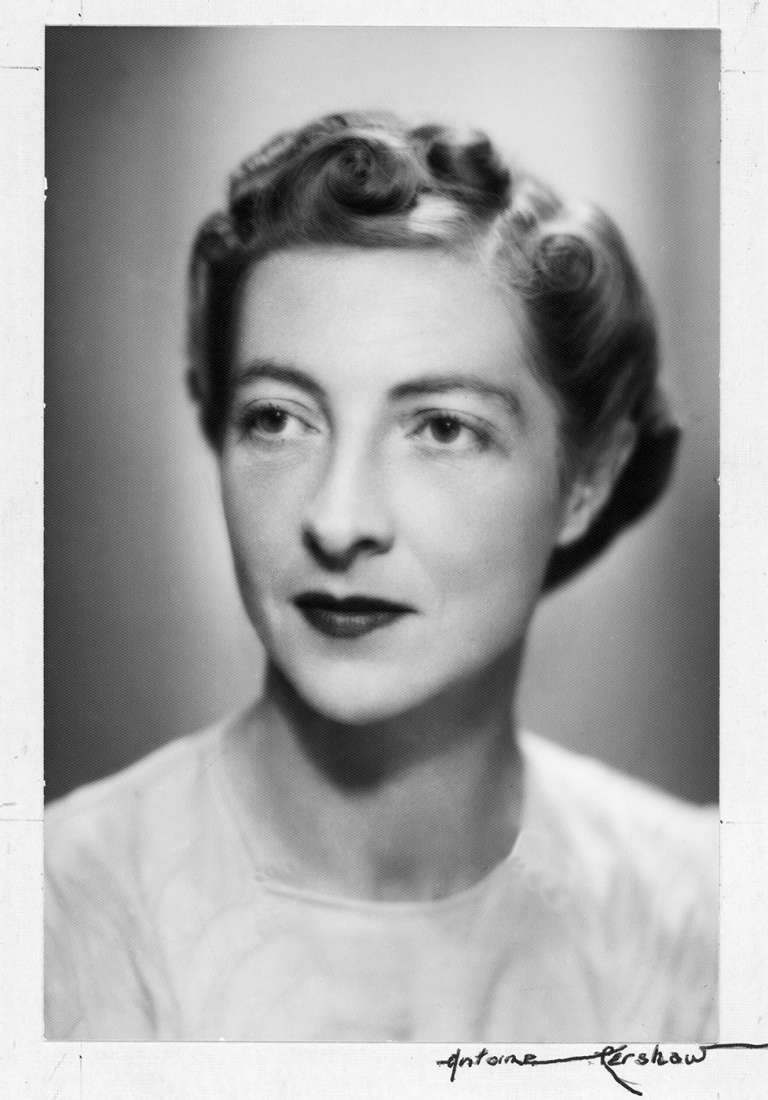
- Lush in c. 1940
- Born: 31 July 1910; Hawthorn, Victoria, Australia
- Died: 20 May 1943 (aged 32); Melbourne, Victoria, Australia
- Citizenship: Australia
- Education: University of Melbourne (B.Sc. 1932, M.Sc. 1934)
- Scientific career
- Fields: Bacteriology
- Workplaces: National Institute for Medical Research; Walter and Eliza Hall Institute of Medical Research

Dora Mary Lush (31 July 1910 – 20 May 1943) was an Australian bacteriologist. She died after accidentally pricking her finger with a needle which contained lethal scrub typhus while attempting to develop a vaccine for the disease.

== Early life ==
Lush was born in Hawthorn, Victoria, the daughter of John Fullarton Lush, a clerk, and his wife Dora Emma Louisa née Puttmann. She had two brothers, who served as officers in the Second AIF and RAAF during World War II. She was educated at Fintona Girls' School and the University of Melbourne, gaining a B.Sc. in 1932 and an M.Sc. in 1934. She was an active sportswoman, being selected for the University of Melbourne's women's basketball team.

== Research ==
Lush worked at the National Institute for Medical Research, London, from early in 1939. She returned to Australia. Her work on the influenza virus was praised in 1940. She worked with Frank Macfarlane Burnet at the Walter and Eliza Hall Institute of Medical Research in Melbourne on a scrub typhus vaccine in 1942, as scrub typhus was a serious health risk to Australian soldiers engaged in jungle warfare in the New Guinea Campaign during World War II.

== Death ==
On 27 April 1943 Lush accidentally pricked her finger with a needle containing scrub typhus while inoculating a mouse. There was no effective treatment at the time for this often fatal disease. She died four weeks later, on 20 May 1943. Before her death she insisted that blood samples be taken from her to aid research. Unfortunately, the researchers were ultimately unable to develop a satisfactory vaccine.

Lush was cremated at Springvale Crematorium on 22 May 1943. A memorial tablet was placed outside the laboratory where she worked at Walter and Eliza Hall Institute.

== Legacy ==
The National Health and Medical Research Council (NHMRC) now offers postgraduate scholarships named in her honour and has referred to her work in a research impact case study.

Lush Place in the Canberra suburb of Chisholm is named in her honour.
