= Kazakhstan and weapons of mass destruction =

The Republic of Kazakhstan, once a republic of the Soviet Union (USSR), was a primary venue for Soviet nuclear weapon testing from 1949 until 1989. Following the collapse of the USSR in 1991, Kazakhstan became the fourth-largest nuclear power (following Ukraine) in the world and hosted a considerably large weapon support infrastructure due to its reliance on the Soviet nuclear program as a means to develop its own local economy. Besides the nuclear program, Kazakhstan was also a prominent site of Soviet programs of biological (only Biopreparat outside of Russia) and chemical weapons.

The former Soviet Union conducted substantial, large scale nuclear testing at the Semipalatinsk-21, whose radiological impact on the environment has resulted in numerous health issues for the population. The Nevada Semipalatinsk movement helped report the cancer-related issues which are examined through the inhabitants living and exposed to villages around Semipalatinsk.

Kazakhstan was the last Soviet republic to declare independence from the Soviet Union, doing so on 16 December 1991. Due to concerns of the spread of cancer to its population, it engaged in rapid denuclearization with help from the United States. Over the years, Kazakhstan has cooperated with Russia in returning all 1,400 active nuclear warheads, and took on a leading role in declaring the Central Asian Nuclear Weapon Free Zone. In 2017, Kazakhstan voted for the Treaty on the Prohibition of Nuclear Weapons and ratified it in 2021.

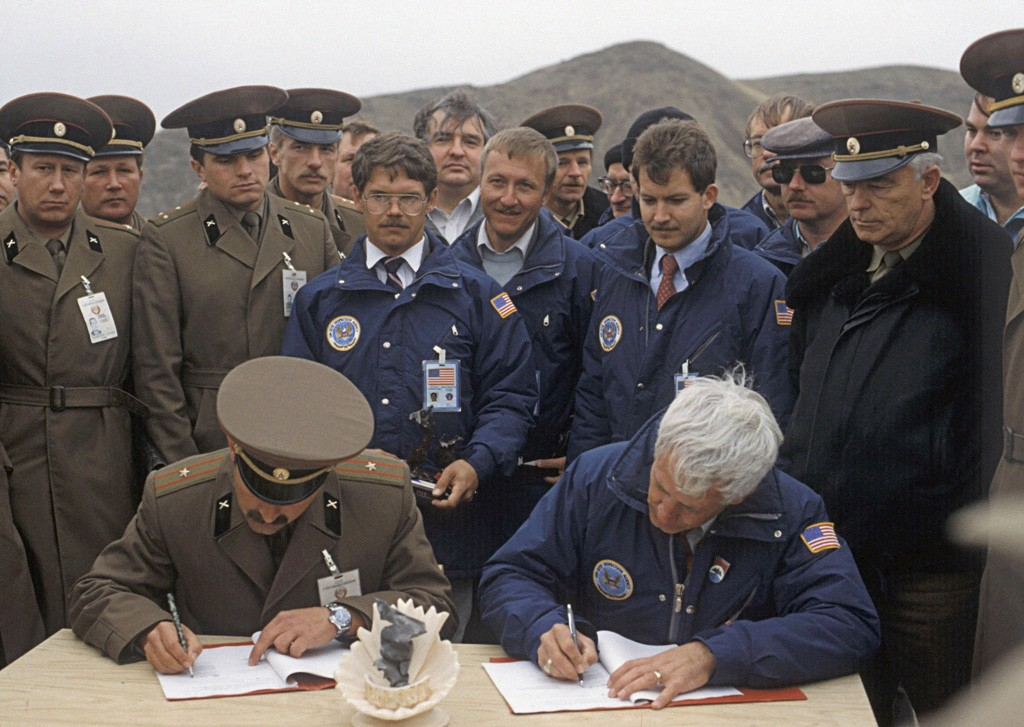
Soviet and US officers at a military base in Kazakhstan. Major Igor Kirichenko and Captain John C. Williams, head of a delegation of US military inspectors, sign report on scrapping the last OTR-23 [SS-23 Spider] missiles in accordance with the Soviet-US Intermediate-Range Nuclear Forces Treaty while Colonel S. Petrenko and the inspection and escort teams look on. Saryozek Missile Elimination Facility, 1989.

== Origins ==
=== Nuclear testing venue ===
On 21 August 1947, the Soviet government established a town, (Kurchatov), in the north-eastern part of the Soviet-managed Kazakhstan to support the Semipalatinsk-21 site as the primary testing venue for Soviet program of nuclear weapons— the first Soviet device, RDS-1, was carried out on 29 August 1949. The Kurchatov is situated in the east of Semipalatinsk (now Semey), a region that once conveyed a sacred cultural meaning to local Kazakhs with its production of many Kazakh writers and musicians. The Semipalatinsk-21 (in Russian: Полигон, lit. Polygon) held 18,300 square kilometres (7,100 sq mi) of vast but relatively remote grassland territory, where the Soviets conducted weapon testing at very large scale on a four major testing venues with two research reactors. For the 40 years, the Semipalatinsk-21 was kept as a former Soviet nuclear testing venue where the nuclear weapon testings (456 nuclear explosive operations were conducted with 116 atmospheric nuclear tests (in air and on surface) taking place at the "Experiential Field" between 1949 and 1963) without the regard of the environmental safety or public health concerns for the local Kazakhs.

With the enforcement of the Partial Test Ban Treaty (PTBT) in 1963, the Soviet program managers began conducting underground nuclear testing and slowly moved the weapon testing infrastructure to Novaya Zemlya, which is north of the Russia. Opposition by local Kazakhs, the Soviets conducted the last test at Semipalatinsk-21 took place in November 1989 and left an active nuclear warhead in 1990 after the collapse of the Soviet Union in 1991, as Kazakhstan inheriting the Semipalatinsk-21 along with Baikonur.

As of current, the Semipalatinsk-21 is overseen by the National Nuclear Center of Kazakhstan with focused on the site's peaceful conservation and its mission is to provide scientific-technical support in areas covering: nuclear power development in Kazakhstan, development of fusion technologies, radiation ecology in Kazakhstan, non-proliferation regime support, and information and staff support in the nuclear industry.

==== Nevada Semipalatinsk movement ====
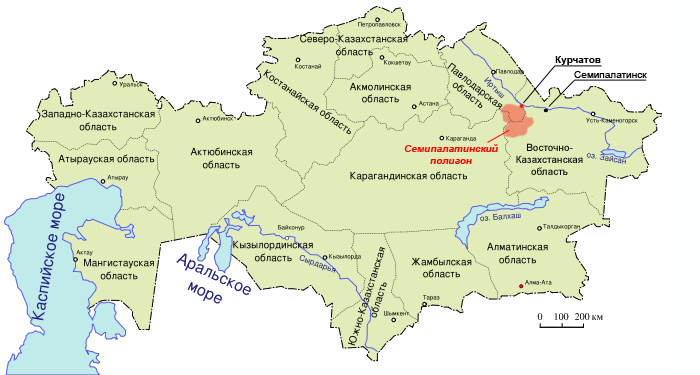
The Russian data shows the primary testing venue for the former Soviet Union's nuclear weapons in Kazakhstan.

The Glasnost' (Russian:Гласность) initiatives led by former Soviet President Mikhail Gorbachev in 1986 provided the Kazakh people to demand the halt of the Soviet nuclear testing, and it gained more public support when the news of possible radioactive contaminants the testing site emitted became public in 1989.

Named as Nevada Semipalatinsk led by Kazakh activist, Olzhas Suleimenov, successfully halted the Soviet nuclear testing in Semey and it played a positive role in promoting public understanding of "the necessity to fight against nuclear threats and finding solutions to global ecological problems", according to UNESCO.

Between 1989 and 1992, Kazakh activists toured the United States with the Nevada Desert Experience in hopes of spreading awareness about the detrimental and radioactive effects of nuclear testing. At the same time, the Western Shoshone, the Native American tribes of the Great Basin, was also working on attempts to reclaim their land, "Newe Sogobia", which is located in the adjacent areas of American nuclear test site known as Nevada Test Site (NTS). Inspired by this, Kazakhs and American activists worked in collaboration through political engagements and exchanged delegates. Following similar timelines, the antinuclear movement was successful in pressuring Kazakh government to close Semipalatinsk-21 in 1991 as well as the U.S. Congress in halting the testing at the Nevada Test Site in 1992.

==== The Kazakhstani cooperation with the United States ====
On 29 August 1991, the Semipalatinsk-21 was officially closed by the Kazakhstani government as the United States, through its Department of Defense, engage in a mission with the objective of enabling further protection nuclear installations and their safe decommissioning.

The American Defense Threat Reduction Agency (DTRA) worked closely with the Kazakh agencies in a joint project known as the Kazakhstani-United States Cooperative Threat Reduction (KUSCTR) project which lasted about 26 years, that safely decommissioning the Semipalatinsk-21 facilities. As a result, the Americans aided the Kazakhstanis in the initiative to safely destroy all nuclear testing infrastructure and in 2000, a final explosion at Semipalatinsk-21 was carried out to destroy its infrastructure.

== Deweaponization ==
On 16 December 1991, Kazakhstan declared independence from the Soviet Union (ten days before its disintegration), Kazakhstan suddenly inherited, along with Ukraine, the largest stockpiles of nuclear weapons. Besides nuclear testing site, Kazakhstan was the most significant site for Soviet military where its biological weapons program under Ken Alibek was based in Stepnogorsk, and chemical weapons were being manufactured in Pavlodar.

Following Ukraine, Kazakhstan became the fourth largest nuclear state with 1,400 nuclear warheads mounted on the 108 or 147 (sources vary) SS-18 ICBMs. In addition, Kazakhstani military also had 40 Tupolev Tu-95 bombers equipped with 320 cruise missiles and hundreds of nuclear weapon support infrastructure. Fear of nuclear proliferation particularly attracted the international attention due to unsubstantiated rumors reported the sale of nuclear warheads to Iran, which was pursuing its own nuclear program. Despite the growing fears of Iranian acquisition of former Soviet nuclear warheads, the operational command and control of these weapon system had remained under the Russian Rocket Forces in Moscow.

With Semipalatinsk-21 site, Kazakhstan also inherited the Baikonur, which Russia debated for the control until agreeing to give ownership to Kazakhstan in 1994.

With aging weapon infrastructure and widely reported cancer cases, the Kazakhstani government reached an understanding to denuclearize its territory by returning all nuclear warheads to Russian Federation in 1994 after signing to legal Alma-Ata Protocol in 1991. On 29 August 1991, the Kazakhstani government closed the former Soviet Semipalatinsk nuclear testing site. In 1992, Kazakhstan further committed to acceding to the Treaty on the Non-Proliferation of Nuclear Weapons (NPT) as non-nuclear weapons states that would not develop, possess, or control nuclear weapon as soon as possible, which they were able to do on 13 December 1993. They also accepted the International Atomic Energy Agency (IAEA) safeguards and assisted in drafting the Central Asia Nuclear Weapons Free Zone Treaty (CANWFZ).

Former Soviet Weapons of Mass Destructions sites in Kazakhstan
| Facilities | Symbol | Established Year | Purpose | Decommissioned | Present-day as of 2022 |
|---|---|---|---|---|---|
| Semipalatinsk | | 1949 | Nuclear testing, primary venue for Soviet nuclear program | 1991 | Abandoned, now in the vicinity of Semey. |
| Sary-Ozek/Baikonur | | 1955 | Rocket and missile testing, primary venue for Soviet space program. | - | Now in Baikonur, and operational under Russian management as of 2022.. |
| Pavlodar Chemical Plant | | 1965 | The only Soviet facility built in Kazakhstan. The manufactured precursor chemicals for CW agents, though it never actually produced any chemical weapons, because Soviet authorities halted the CW program before the final CW production lines were complete. | 1991 | Now in Pavlodar. |
| Scientific Experimental and Production Base | | 1982 | The only Biopreparat facility to be built outside of Russia for the means of producing biological weapons. | 1991 | At present, it is known as Stepnogorsk Scientific and Technical Institute for Microbiology whose mission is overseen by American CRDF Global. |

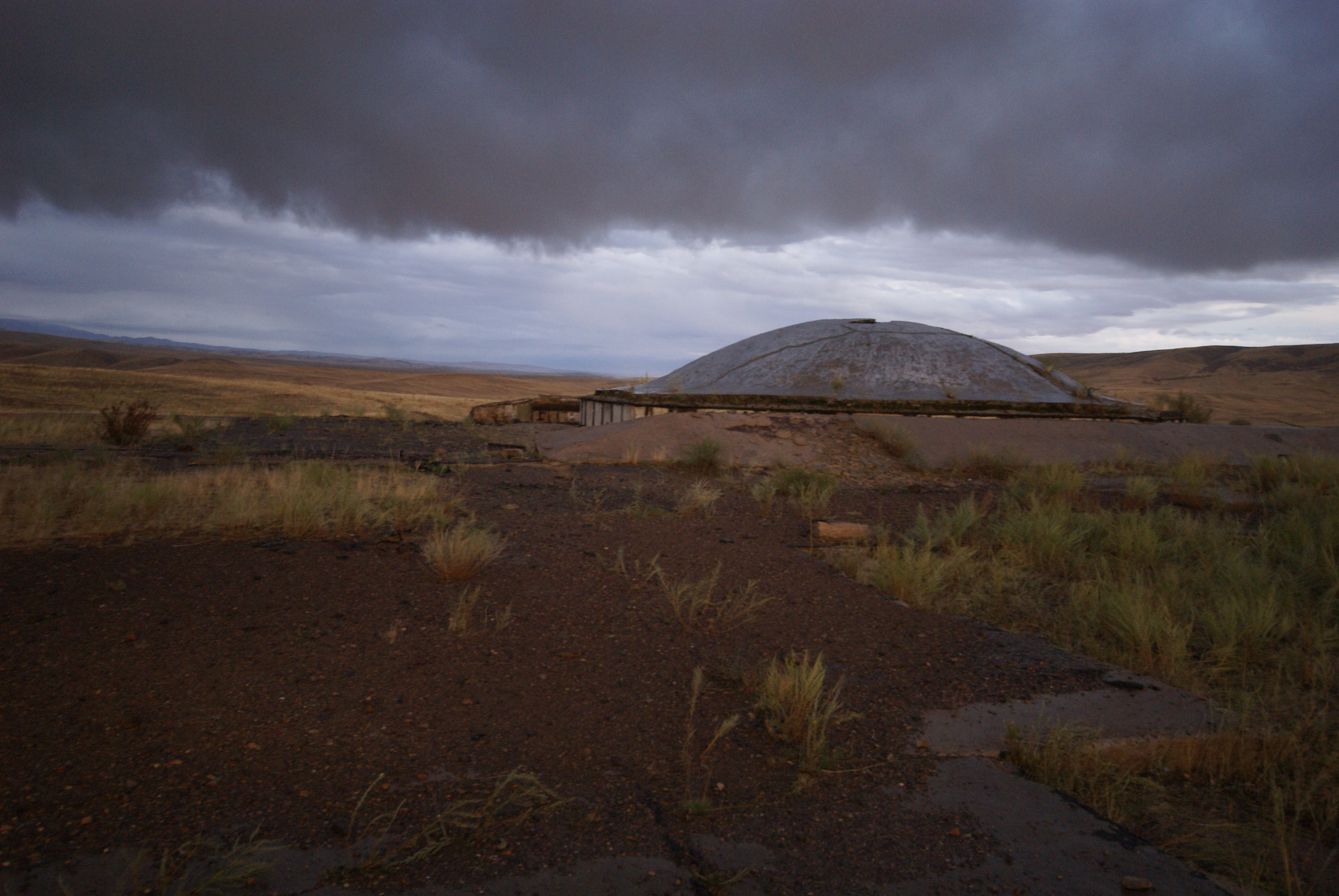
The Sary-Ozek missile base that once held SS-23 Spider missile.

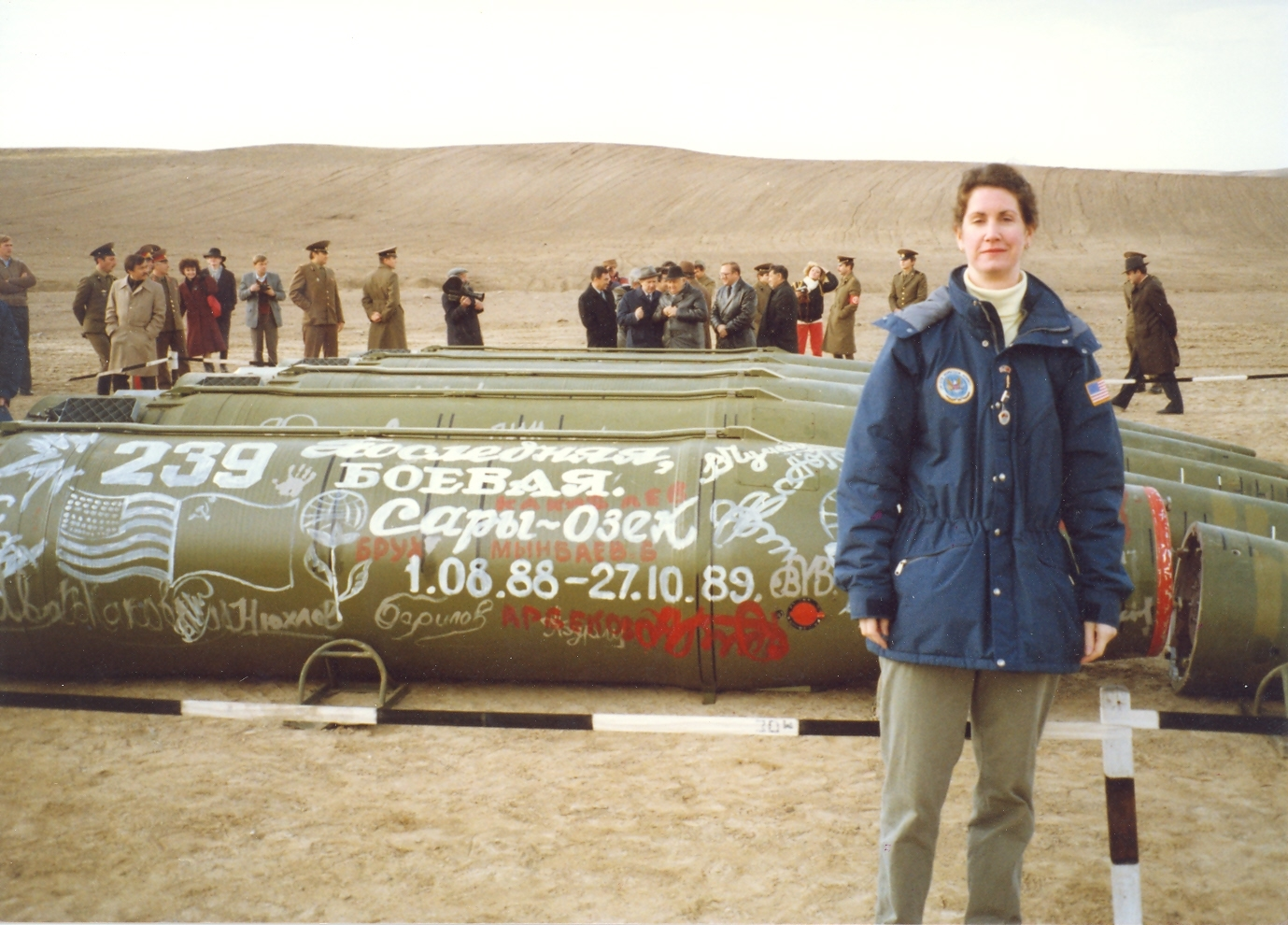
The Nuclear missile SS-23 Spider being decommissioned in 1990

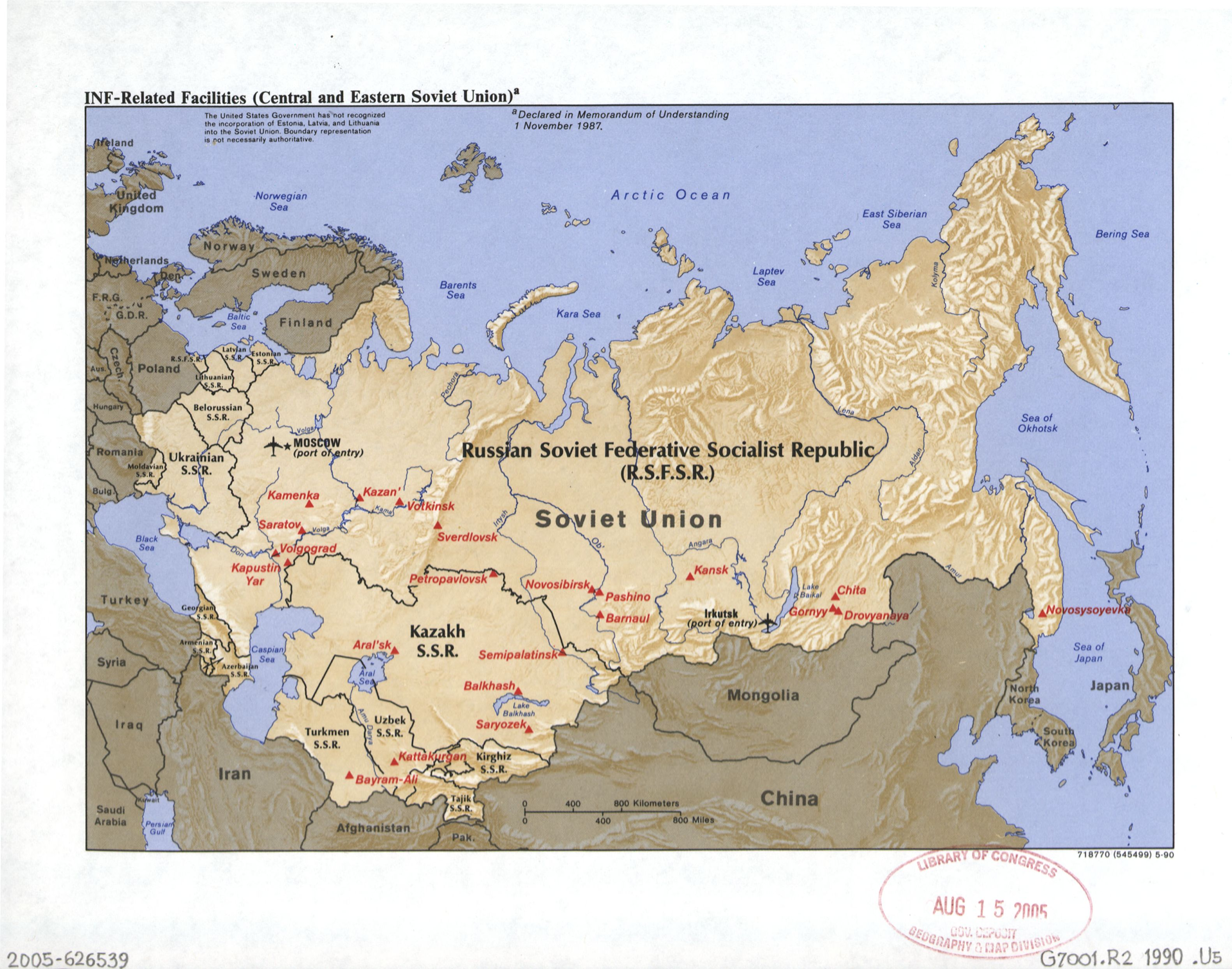
The former Soviet nuclear weapon facilities in Kazakhstan, 1990

== Legacies ==
=== Health effects ===
In understanding the way these nuclear tests have affected populations, Kazakh authorities have run into challenges due to lack of data that would outline the happenings at the Semipalatinsk Nuclear Test Site (SNTS), and the difficulty of measuring radiation. It is also argued that much of the challenge also stemmed from the restriction of available information on health data that the Soviet military and health institutions collected at the time. In addition to this, health studies surrounding the test site started relatively late, making it difficult to trace the early effects of irradiation.

Despite this, there has been an expressed concern from local health authorities regarding radiation health effects and cancer. Conducted by Bauer, et al. in the 1960s was an analysis of a cohort study that included 19,545 inhabitants of exposed and comparison villages around Semipalatinsk that would confirm the detrimental effect of radiation to health. In their examination of mortality over the 40 years of data collecting, they have found large differences between the two sample populations in which the rate of mortality and cancer was far larger in the exposed group than the comparison group. The most common cancers found within the exposed group were traces of cancer in tumors, lung cancer, stomach cancer, breast cancer, and esophageal cancer in women.

Possible indicators of early acute effects (1950–1960) have also been identified:

- High infant mortality rate: 100-110 cases per 1000 infants were known to have been affected in areas that were most exposed.
- Congenital malformations: understood to be more frequent in groups that were exposed. Most common types were congenital malformations of the nervous system and facial malformations.
- Leukemia: frequency of leukemia found in children doubled between 1945 and 1948.

In terms of long term early effects, in addition to the increase of mortality and cancer, cardiovascular diseases were more prevalent in the exposed group where the level of cardiovascular disease among 40-49 year-olds was comparable to the levels typically found in 50-59 year old's in the comparison group. Rates of mortality due to cardiovascular disease were also higher in the exposed group. Women who were exposed to radiation in childhood also experienced malformations among their children upon birth. This is proven to be due to the effects of nuclear testing radiation as following 1985, the rates of malformation in children dropped, possibly due to a new generation of mothers who have not been exposed to the radiation.

Indicators of late long-term effects (1985–2010) include premature aging: examined through a five-year study conducted in 2000-2005 where the diagnosis for several types of cancers in exposed populations were 6 – 9 years lower than in unexposed populations. On average, life expectancy was also inevitably lower in exposed populations.

=== Politics ===
Since its independence, Kazakhstan has been determined to turn its military heritage and scars to a new purpose of fostering a peaceful nuclear industry and use the technological foundations to build a civilian nuclear sector capable of boosting its economy whilst, on the international stage, pursuing non-proliferation diplomacy. Since its independence, Kazakhstan acted as a model state by cooperating with the removal of its nuclear arsenal whilst fully adopting non-proliferation norms and treaties. Nonetheless, locally, the nation has not been able to use nuclear material for peaceful uses such as setting up a nuclear energy program due to the negative public sentiment towards it due to historical accidents.

More recently, Kazakhstan has been one of the strongest players on pushing a global ban on nuclear weapons whilst being keen on the peaceful use of nuclear technology. Therefore, notably Kazakhstan was one of the first fifty countries to sign and ratify the Treaty on the Prohibition of Nuclear Weapons, which was symbolically ratified on the 70th anniversary of the first Soviet nuclear test in Kazakh soil. Kazakhstan has also taken softer diplomatic measures to promote its non-proliferation objective and increase the outreach of its policy. For example, the Kazakh government condemned China's nuclear testing program in 1995. In 2009, by President Nazarbayev’s initiative, the UN proclaimed UNGA Resolution 64/35 that declared 29 August as the International Day of Nuclear Weapons Renunciation. Finally, President Nazarbayev urged the international community "to make the building of a nuclear-weapon-free world the main goal of humanity in the 21st century" during the General Debate of the UNGA in September 2015, followed by the tabling of resolution 70/57 to establish a Universal Declaration for the Achievement of a Nuclear-Weapon-Free World.

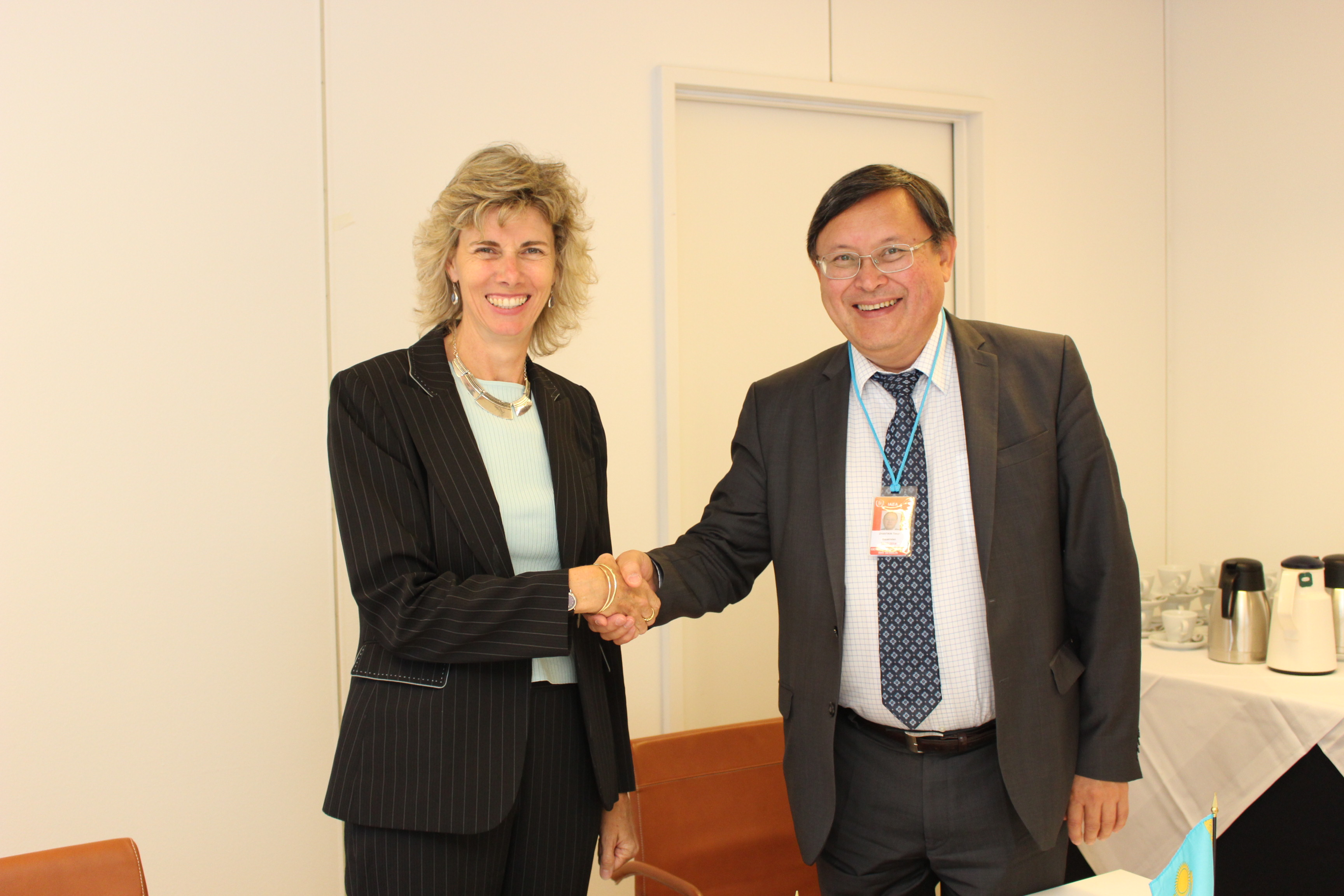
NRC Signs Agreement with Kazakhstan in Vienna

Formally, Kazakhstan has:

- Acceded to Treaty on the Non-Proliferation of Nuclear Weapons (NPT)
- Ratified the Partial Nuclear Test Ban Treaty (PTBT)
- Ratified the Comprehensive Nuclear Test Ban Treaty (CTBT)
- Ratified the Lisbon Protocol to START I
- Ratified the Central Asia Nuclear-Weapon-Free Zone
- Ratified the Treaty on the Prohibition of Nuclear Weapons (TPNW) (Notably the only former Soviet successor state to do so)
- Ratified the Collective Security Treaty Organization (CTSO)

==== Comprehensive Test Ban Treaty ====
On 30 September 1996, Kazakhstan signed the Comprehensive Nuclear-Test-Ban Treaty and ratified it on 14 May 2002. Immediately, Kazakhstan became an important party to the treaty as its National Nuclear Center has several seismic stations and one infrasound station that work as detection equipment for nuclear tests. Furthermore, the Semipalatinsk Test Site is suited to calibrate the stations with large explosions.

==== Central Asian Nuclear-Weapon Free Zone ====
In 2006, Kazakhstan, Kyrgyzstan, Tajikistan, Turkmenistan, and Uzbekistan signed the Tashkent Treaty that established a nuclear-weapon free zone in Central Asia. Uzbekistan put forward the idea of the nuclear-weapon free zone for the first time in 1993 when Kazakhstan still had Soviet nuclear weapons so it failed to grasp support from all parties, however, in 1995 the parties agreed to start drafting the Treaty after Kazakhstan denuclearized. In the Treaty, the parties agreed to never manufacture, acquire, test, or possess nuclear weapons on its territory again and called for nuclear states under the Non-Proliferation Treaty to respect their policy.

==== IAEA low enriched uranium bank ====
On 27 August 2015, the IAEA and Kazakhstan signed an agreement to host the world's first Low Enriched Uranium Bank in the Ulba Metallurgical Plant located in Oskemen. Active since 2019, the bank is owned and operated by the IAEA as part of an effort to assure access to nuclear fuel in case there are any disruptions to the commercial supply of LEU, especially considering the projected increase in demand for the material as new nuclear reactors are built. The objective of this assurance-of-supply mechanism is for countries to be less tempted to develop their own nuclear fuel production facilities hence reducing the risk of proliferation. Therefore, the facility’ minimal capacity aims to always be at least one reload for each reactor design currently on the market.

The initiative was formally born in 2006 when US Senator Sam Nunn, co-chair of the NGO Nuclear Threat Initiative, offered $50 million to the IAEA to create a LEU bank after Director-General ElBaradei called for approaches to tackle the most sensible part of the nuclear fuel cycle, uranium enrichment and plutonium separation, while guaranteeing the material's supply and non-proliferation. This initiative won the financing and support from the IAEA over other 11 existing ones after President Nazarbayev offered to host the bank in 2009. After an extensive three and a half years of negotiations between the IAEA Secretariat and the Kazakhstani authorities, the agreement was finalized in January 2015 where Kazakhstan agreed to lease the facility to the IAEA for one euro annually.

The establishment of the International Atomic Energy Agency (IAEA) and the Low Enriched Uranium Bank represents a joint initiative between Kazakhstan's government and the IAEA to support global nuclear nonproliferation regime. Located at the Ulba Metallurgical Plant in Oskemen, the facility is the first internationally controlled depository of its kind.

==== Nunn-Lugar Cooperative Threat Reduction Program ====
As part of Project Sapphire in the Nunn-Lugar Cooperative Threat Reduction Program, the United States announced on 23 November 1994, its measure to assist Kazakhstan on the removal of 581 kg of Highly Enriched Uranium from the Ulba Metallurgical Plant in Ust Kamenogorsk. The U.S. airlifted the materials back from Kazakhstan, downblended it into LEU, and sold it on the market on behalf of the U.S. government. In return, Kazakhstan received around $25 million in cash and in-kind assistance. As part of the same programme, between 1995 and 2001, the U.S. helped seal 13 bore holes and 181 tunnels at testing sites.

==== Opposition of nuclear weapons ====
Heading into the 21st century, Kazakhstan continued to play a role in opposing nuclear weapons. President Nursultan Nazarbayev founded the ATOM project (which stands for Abolish Testing. Our Mission) in 2012, and spoke in favor of a nuclear-weapons-free-world in 2015 at the UN General Assembly General Debate before tabling a resolution to initiate a Universal Declaration for the Achievement of a Nuclear-Weapon-Free World that was adopted on 8 December. On 29 August 2016, which marked both the UN International Day against Nuclear Tests and the 25th anniversary of the closure of the Semipalatinsk site, Kazakhstan hosted an international conference – Building a Nuclear-Weapon-Free World.

== Current situation ==
=== Uranium extraction ===
Since the discovery of uranium deposits in the 1950s, Kazakhstan has been engaged in active mining, and construction of the uranium ore processing centers. Before the dissolution of the USSR, Kazakhstan was the most important ground for military-industrial activity, producing more than 70,000 metric tons of natural uranium a year. A fast progressing uranium mining industry could have made Kazakhstan the fourth nuclear giant. However, after the Soviet Union collapsed, Kazakhstan made a decision to pursue policies of denuclearization.

On 14 February 1994, Kazakhstan officially ratified the Non-Proliferation Treaty that prohibited the deployment of nuclear weapons on Kazakhstan's territory. Ever since, the International Atomic Energy Agency (IAEA) has been maintaining control of the nuclear-weapons-usable materials located in the country. The facilities that are currently under control are the Institute of Atomic Energy, Power Reactors, Research Reactors. However, for the longest time most of the Uranium Processing sites have not been monitored by the IAEA. It was not until 2016 that the IAEA provided security guidance documents that include control and security measures, physical protection of natural uranium and full assurance of safety during transportation, production and storage. Thereby, a rigorous and effective assistance of International Atomic Energy Agency allows Kazakhstan to continue safely produce more than 20,000 tons of natural uranium per year and maintain 23 production sites for extracting and processing uranium.

Nowadays, Kazakhstan has been using its nuclear past and resources to develop connections and make agreements with other countries. Kazakhstan's nuclear past gave it necessary nuclear facilities, mining complexes, technological and scientific knowledge to develop uranium industries. Well-developed infrastructure and resources allows Kazakhstan to effectively mine and export natural uranium, export nuclear fuel, and build nuclear reactors.

One of the largest companies in Kazakhstan and in the global nuclear market is Kazatomprom. This company holds a monopoly over all activities associated with uranium mining and nuclear-fuel. Every year the production of uranium increased, in 2007 Kazatomprom was producing 6,637 tonnes but in 2010 it produced 15,000 tonnes. Over the years, Kazakhstan has become an absolute leader in production of uranium holding 41% of world supply.

==== Potential risks ====
Kazakhstan's ambitious plans in the uranium and nuclear fuel field raised concerns. One of which is the risk of its proliferation and the creation of dirty bombs from natural uranium waste. Since the non-proliferation treaty was signed, Kazakhstan has never breached any rules and showed an excellent record, supporting strict non-proliferation regulations. However, the risk remains due to the country's activities in the nuclear field.

Kazakhstan's regulatory and legal framework regarding nuclear facilities is constantly being improved to regulate the main aspects of activities for the peaceful use of nuclear energy. The main purpose is the development of the nuclear industry and the creation of nuclear energy to ensure the accelerated industrial and innovative development of the country.

==== Seeking to diversify the pool of partners ====
Kazatomprom has entered into cooperation agreements and established a number of joint ventures with companies from Russia, Canada, France, China and Japan. Russia has always been one of the main partners of Kazakhstan in enrichment of uranium. In May 2007, the International Uranium Enrichment Centre in Angarsk was established by Kazakh-Russian joint venture. Another major joint-venture was set with China. In December 2006 China Guangdong Nuclear Power Group signed a strategic cooperation agreement with Kazatomprom. According to the agreement Kazatomprom will be a major supplier of uranium supply and fuel fabrication to China. Such a venture is strategically crucial to China's nuclear power industry. With Japan, Kazatomprom made agreements to supply uranium in return for the technical assistance in fuel cycle developments and nuclear reactor construction. In May 2007, Canada agreed to use its refining technologies to increase the production of its Inkai mine in Kazakhstan and build a nuclear-conversion plant on the site of the Ulba Metallurgical plant in eastern Kazakhstan that will boost the production of uranium to 12,000 tonnes. The agreement with the French multinational company Areva is another joint-venture that will further increase the production of uranium per year to approximately 4,000 tonnes.

==== Future and ISL method ====
In the 70s-80s, a few uranium deposits that were discovered in Kazakhstan appeared to be amenable to the In situ leach (ISL) method. This methods is less costly and more environmentally friendly. When one of the most unique uranium ore regions - The Chu-Syrdarya - was discovered, the ISL method was used to carry out tests and extraction. As a result of successful testing using ISL method, more than 80% of uranium was extracted. Due to the ISL method, the Chu-Syrdarya uranium region was successfully mined and developed. The reserve is unique in the sense that its reserves range from 20,000 to 350,000 tons of uranium. The total resources of the region account for about 0.6 million of approved uranium.

The ISL method attracts a lot of world uranium producers. This method provides both ecological and economic advantages. Uranium extraction with ISL method results in less surface damage, reduced contamination and costs. In addition, the new technological advancements in ISL operations can increase the production capacity and allow for the development of successful, sustainable uranium mining industries.

== See also ==
- Kazatomprom
- Foreign relations of Kazakhstan
  - Kazakhstan - Iran relations
  - Kazakhstan–United States relations

== Bibliography ==
- Bauer, S., et al. "Radiation Exposure due to Local Fallout from Soviet Atmospheric Nuclear Weapons Testing in Kazakhstan: Solid Cancer Mortality in the Semipalatinsk Historical Cohort, 1960–1999." Radiat. Res. 164, 409–419, 2005.
- Kassenova, T. "Kazakhstan’s ‘Nuclear Renaissance.’" St Antony's International Review 4, no. 2 (2009): 51–74. JSTOR 26472733
- Semipalatinsk Nuclear Testing: The Humanitarian Consequences. (n.d.). Retrieved 14 March 2022, from http://large.stanford.edu/courses/2014/ph241/powell2/docs/vakulchuk.pdf
- Semipalatinsk Test Site. The Nuclear Threat Initiative. (2022, 13 January). Retrieved 14 March 2022, from https://www.nti.org/education-center/facilities/semipalatinsk-test-site/
