= Anti-nuclear movement in Russia =

The anti-nuclear movement in Russia is a social movement against nuclear technologies, largely stemming from the results of the Chernobyl incident in 1986. During the most active phase of the anti-nuclear movement, from 1988 to 1992, construction of over 100 nuclear projects were prevented on the territory of the Soviet Union. Also, the economic troubles of the 1990s led to a reduction in the number of construction projects. This deprived the anti-nuclear movement of its raison d’être. At the same time, it too was affected by financial difficulties, in particular the lack of donations, which continues to be an issue today. Since the 2000s the Russian Government embarked on highly pro-nuclear policy, with plans to invest billions of dollars in developing the nuclear industry, which leaves the movement with big challenges.

The first nuclear power plant in Russia was built in 1954, a 5 MWe reactor in Obninsk. In the several years prior to 1954, Russia began building more nuclear power plants, and by the mid-1980s, had built a total of twenty-five reactors. By the early 2000s, Russia has about ten nuclear power plants and thirty-one operating reactors. With these new nuclear power plants and reactors, eight out of the ten nuclear power plants can be found in the European part of Russia. In the Eastern part of Urals, two other nuclear power plants can be found.

Russia has a long history of nuclear power plants. It was beneficial to the country when it first began but the view quickly changed in the post-Chernobyl period. On April 26, 1986 when the Chernobyl Nuclear Plant malfunctioned, it gave birth to the anti-nuclear movement in Russia and many anti-nuclear organizations emerged in the USSR. Many of these anti-nuclear protest or activities took place in the 1980s, which motivated people to pursue the anti-nuclear law that was later to be found to be short lived, due to the collapse of the Soviet Union. In the earlier years of the anti-nuclear movement, there were several activists that followed help assist in the movement to pursue the goal of becoming a denuclearized country.

== Nuclear Non-Proliferation Treaty ==
The Nuclear Non-Proliferation Treaty has helped the anti-nuclear movement in Russia. It has requirements that help to reduce or completely remove all types of nuclear weapons. The Strategic Arms Reduction Talks Treaty (START), are talks that assist in getting rid of the part and significance of nuclear weapons not only in the military, but also in security policies.

== History ==
=== Beginnings ===
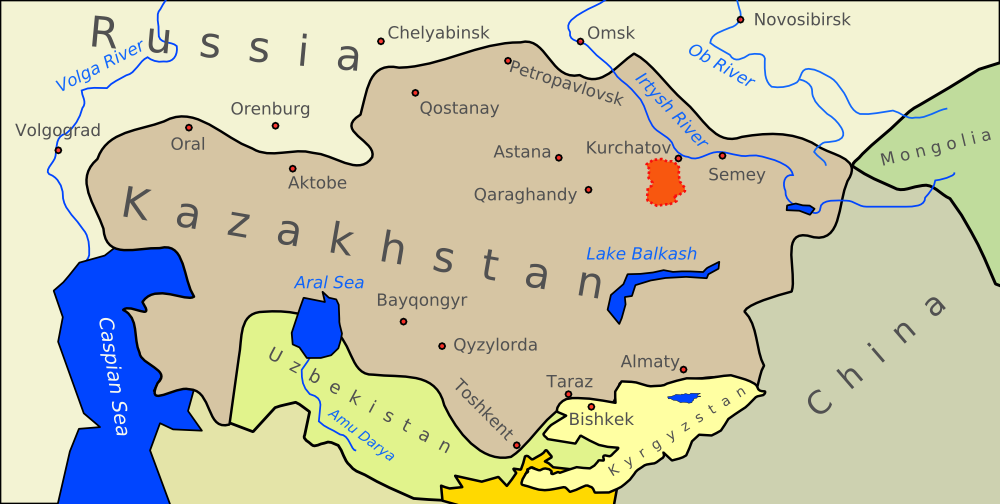
The 18,000 km^{2} expanse of the Semipalatinsk Test Site (indicated in red), attached to Kurchatov (along the Irtysh river). The site comprised an area the size of Wales.

During the most active phase of the anti-nuclear movement in the Soviet Union and Russia—from 1988 to 1992 over 100 nuclear projects were prevented on the territory of the Soviet Union. These were not just reactors, but also infrastructure projects linked to the planned power stations and other nuclear enterprises. This social activism succeeded in stopping nearly all of the nuclear plants under construction in Russia, either temporarily or permanently. After active protests, the planned construction of nuclear plants in Tatarstan and Bashkortostan, as well as of nuclear heating plants (Atomnye Stantsii Teplosnabzheniya—AST) in Gorky and Voronezh were stopped.

=== 2000s ===
The nuclear industry, struggling with liquidity problems, proposed that a new law be passed permitting the commercial import of spent nuclear fuel—the most dangerous kind of highly-toxic waste. It was claimed that this business could generate US$20 billion within ten years. The first reading of this draft law was held at the State Duma at the end of 2000, with more than 90 percent of lawmakers voting in favor. After hundreds of public groups had engaged in just a few months of campaigning against this legislative proposal, more than 40 percent of Duma delegates changed their stance. The law was accepted, but the opponents were only three votes short of the quorum needed to reject it. The environmentalists managed to secure a significant tightening of the procedure for importing nuclear waste compared to the first draft of the law. This was one of the reasons why the entire proposal for importing nuclear waste to Russia ultimately failed.

In August 2008, activists from all over Europe and Russia (about 50 persons) gathered in a 'tent city' near Nizhny Novgorod to participate in a 2-week anti-nuclear camp, which consisted of demonstrations and protests, music shows, workshops, movie shows & etc., to make the citizens of Nizhny Novgorod aware of a new NPP that's planned by Rosatom to be built in Nizhny Novgorod area.

In autumn 2010, “EcoDefense!” played an important role in preventing a nuclear waste transport from the Rossendorf research reactor to Russia. Another example was the campaign against construction of the nuclear power plant in the area of Nizhny Novgorod. According to opinion surveys, about 70 per cent of the population were opposed to the nuclear plant (the survey was conducted before the disaster in Japan).

In the city of Murom, 20 km from the site of the planned power plant, a local movement has been in existence for several years that has managed to delay construction of the plant. This movement was also responsible for organizing a demonstration of 5,000 people in autumn 2009- one of the largest protests against nuclear energy in Russia in the 21st century. The event was largely ignored by the Russian national media, although it was a unique event for the country.

== Protest ==
=== Rostov Nuclear Power Plant ===
Rostov Nuclear Power Plant Around the 1970s, Russia began to construct the Rostov Nuclear Power Plant, which was in the pre-Chernobyl era. After locals from the nearby town of Volgodonsk learned that the nuclear reactor being built was on an active earthquake fault line, they began to protest. The power plant's radioactive wastewater would create potentially dangerous water which would go into the town's drinking water. Due to the townspeople's protest, the construction of the nuclear power plant was cancelled.

Several years later in 1996, the Nuclear Power Ministry of Russia announced that they were going to continue with their plans to start construction of the nuclear power plant in Rostov, and have it opened for action by 1998. However, the protest against building the power plant began again on July 27 that same year. Around seventy protesters from Russia and several other countries nearby protested on a nearby road of where the plant was going to be built. The protesters barricaded the road by handcuffing themselves to barrels of concrete. These protesters called themselves the "Rainbow Keepers". About two days later, around five-hundred Rostov workers were sent out to stop the protesters. The workers attacked the peaceful protesters by setting their tents on fire and burning them to the ground. Many men and women were severely beaten. Five of the seventy Rainbow Keepers were hospitalized due to brain injuries.

=== Voronezh Nuclear Heating Plant ===
During a protest in March 1999 against the construction of the planned Voronezh Nuclear Heating Plant, there were three people that were arrested for protesting against the construction of the heating plant. That same day, the Eurasian anti-nuclear networking conference was being held in the city of Voronezh. The protest was supported by local residents, and among those were several that voted against the 1990 referendum. The referendum of 1990 was what stopped the nuclear heating plant from being built, though now there has been some conflict with the decision on the power plant to be reserved.

=== Leningrad Nuclear Power Plant ===
In Russia, the first reactor was known as the Leningrad Nuclear Power Plant, being built in Sosnovy Bor. The Leningrad Nuclear Power Plant had many incidents that caused people to die due to radiation. This caused people to feel upset about what was being done after the deaths of many civilians. It soon became a protest which was known as the "Nuclear Monsters’ protest of the Leningrad".

=== Reactors Prevented from being Built ===
Several nuclear reactors were prevented from being built due to the efforts of anti-nuclear activist from 1988 to 1992. The planned construction of the following reactors were cancelled:

- Reactor number 1 of the Kostroma NPP
- Reactors number 3 and 4 of the Kaliningrad NPP
- Reactor number 4 of the Beloyarsk NPP
- Reactors number 1 and 2 of the Rostov NPP
- Reactor number 5 of the Kursk NPP.

== Notable Anti-Nuclear Activists ==
=== Vladimir Slivyak ===
Right after a bombing in Moscow on September 6, 1999, several anti-nuclear activists were detained under suspicion. Vladimir Slivyak was one of the three arrested under suspicion. He was an activist in the anti-nuclear movement and a Voronezh action camp organizer. After the bombing Slivyak was pushed into a car by several men who claimed to be Moscow police. The police interrogated and threatened Slivyak for around ninety minutes before letting him go. The Moscow police thought environmentalists from the anti-nuclear movement were associated with the bombing since an earlier bombing occurred on August 31 at Manezh Palace in Moscow. After the incident, on August 31, several more bombings occurred which agitated many people, leading to the racially profiled arrest of dark-skinned Muscovites and visitors to the Russian capital.

=== Professor Yablokov ===
Russian scientists were reported by an anti-nuclear activist named Yablokov in 2010 for the twenty-five percent of radiation that was released instantly from the explosion. In Russia, one of Professor Yablokov's colleagues, Professor Busby petitioned to the European Union Parliament. His petition was to reconsider the official standards of basic safety of radiation. Many of Prof. Yablokov's colleagues and himself were confident enough that the standards of radiation requirements were not providing accurate data. According to Prof. Yablokov and his colleagues, one of the main consequences of the nuclear accident of Chernobyl was thyroid cancer. There was a great increase in not only thyroid cancer but in many more diseases relating back to radiation. Prof. Yablokov and his colleagues were asked to report the impacts of radiation on the lives of civilians before and after the accident. There were two major differences between the numbers of pre-Chernobyl and post-Chernobyl. Between these two differences, it showed the number of reports being made due to cancer, leukemia and psychological disorders. In addition to the reports being made, it was already difficult enough to prove that radiation was the only cause of the increase of these diseases.
