= Keshrim Boztayev =

Kazakhstani political activist (1933–1999)

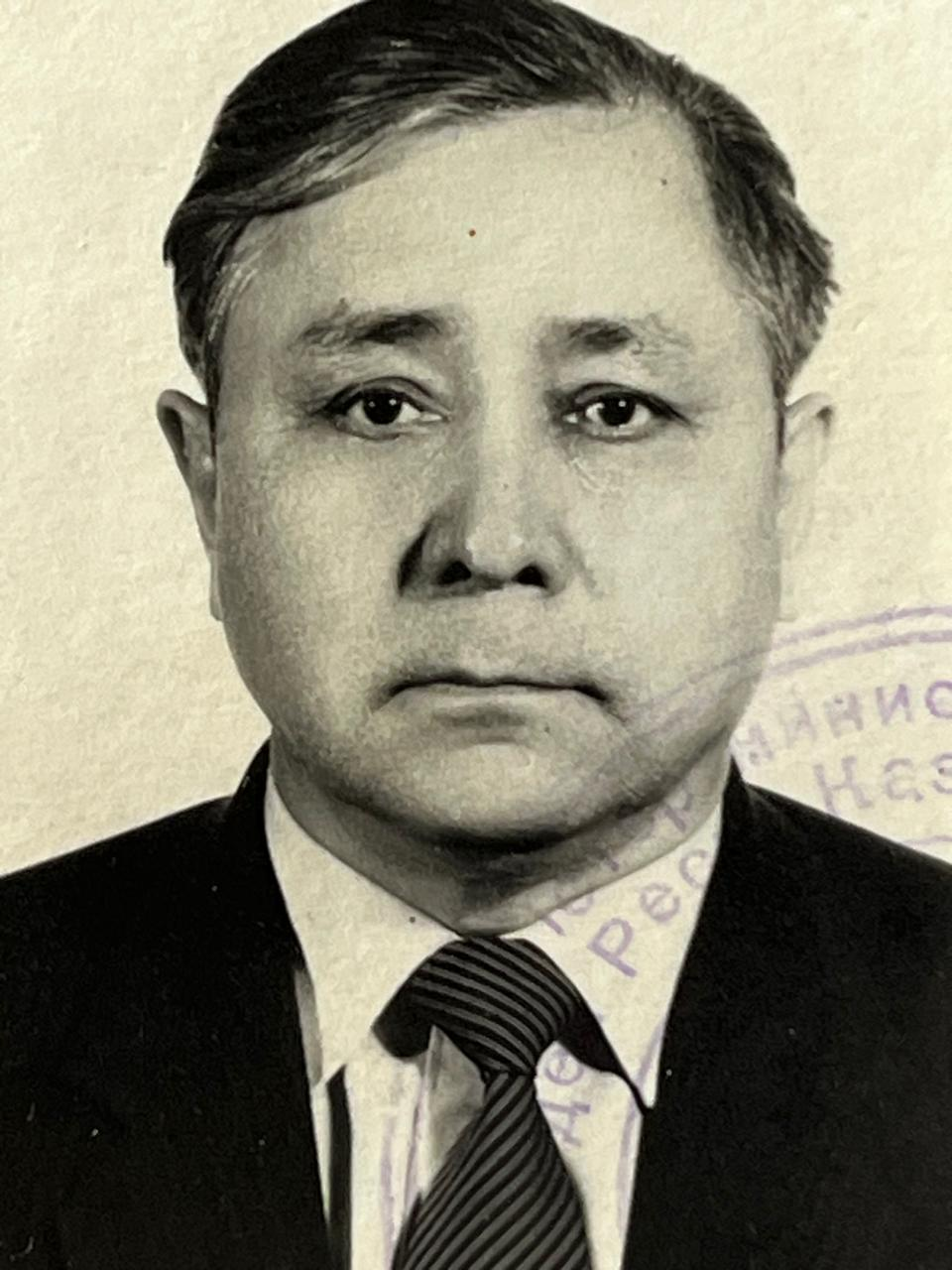

Keshrim Boztayev (25 June 1933 – 1999) was a Kazakh political activist working to provide health care for those affected by the Soviet nuclear test program.

== Early life ==
Boztayev was born 25 June 1933 at Akchatau village in Ayagoz district in the Semipalatinsk region. He studied at the Kazakh Mining and Metallurgy Institute. After graduation he worked as refiner, senior melter, shift master, process engineer, workshop manager. Boztayev died in 1999.

== Career ==
=== Professional and academic ===
Bozyatev became a member of the Academy of National Security Problems research in 1997 (Moscow), an academician of National Academy “Ecology”, an Honorary Citizen of Semipalatinsk town, and Professor emeritus of Semipalatinsk Medical Academy.

=== Political ===
Boztayev rose through the ranks of the Kazakh Communist Party:

- Party committee secretary of Ust-Kamenogorsk lead and zinc plant (1956–1973)
- Secretary, Second Secretary of East-Kazakhstan Regional Party Committee(1973–1985)
- Chairman of East-Kazakhstan Executive Regional Committee (1985–1987)
- First Secretary of Semipalatinsk Regional Committee of Communist party (1987–1991)
- Chairman of Semipalatinsk Regional people’s deputies Council (1990–1993)
- People’s deputy of USSR (1989–1991)
- Member of Defense and National Security Committee of Supreme Soviet of USSR (1989–1991)
- Deputy of Supreme Soviet of Kazakh SSR of 11th convention.
- 1996-1999 – chairman of Foundation Council “Polygon – 29 August”

He received the Order of the Red Banner of Labour three times, and earned various medals, Certificates of Honour, and certificates of merit, and was an Honoured Official of the Republic of Kazakhstan.

=== Author ===
Boztayev was the author of:

- From first fire to atom (1956)
- Experience of integrated usage of raw materials in Ust-Kamenogorsk lead and zinc plant (1972)
- Semipalatinsk Polygon (1992), republished in 2006
- Kaynar syndrome (1995)
- Polygon – 29 August (1998), republished in Japan.

== Activism ==
Boztayev contributed to the industrial development of the East Kazakhstan and Semipalatinsk regions. He attacked the continuation of nuclear weapons tests at Semipalatinsk Nuclear Test site (coded telegram to Central Committee of the Communist Party of the USSR addressed to President Mikhail S. Gorbachev, 20 February 1989), which was the first official document arguing for stopping the tests. Despite the resistance of the military–industrial complex, Boztayev pursued policy for ending tests for two and a half years.

On 29 August 1991, Semipalatinsk Nuclear test site was closed by the Decree of the President of Kazakhstan, Nursultan Nazarbaev. As first secretary of Semipalatinsk regional committee, he supported democratic reforms in late 1980s, and the anti-nuclear movement “Nevada-Semipalatinsk”, which became an international movement for the closure of nuclear test sites.

Boztayev requested the Russian Military industrial complex to declassify materials regarding the effects of nuclear tests and to transfer this information to Kazakhstan. He sought financial aid to the region of the Semipalatinsk Test Site and improvement of the socio-economic conditions of the population. He insisted on a special commission for radio-ecological and health assessment of affeced residents.

A state commission led to declassifying materials concerning ecological effects by nuclear tests and transferring them to Kazakhstan. An expert medical and social assessment commission and conference were created. Based on his initiative, the first All Soviet Union “Health of the population and ecological situation in Semipalatinsk region” Conference was conducted 17–19 July 1989 in Semipalatinsk; it revealed to the world the consequences of nuclear tests. The resolution for closing Semipalatinsk nuclear test site was adopted at this conference.

Boztayev was an author of the “Social protection of citizens who suffered as a result of nuclear tests conducted in Semipalatinsk nuclear test site” law passed 18 December 1992. In 1996, Boztayev, along with other public figures, organized the international charitable foundation “Polygon – 29 August”.

Boztayev created a program of medical rehabilitation for sufferers from nuclear tests (Kazakhstan Government decree № 336, 17.03.1997), and one of the first to draw attention and practical aid to the problems. The "Polygon - 29 August" fund was an initiator of resolutions 52 and 53 passed in sessions of General Assembly of UN in 1997-1998. The Fund received Roster Consultative status with the Economic and Social Council of the United Nation (ECOSOC) in 2002.

== See also ==
- Anti-nuclear movement in Kazakhstan
- Kazakhstan and weapons of mass destruction
