= Test (2014 film) =

2014 Russian film directed by Alexander Kott

- Test, directed by Alexander Kott
- Russian: Испытание
- Directed by: Aleksandr Kott
- Written by: Aleksandr Kott
- Produced by: Anna Kagarlitskaya; Alexander Kozlov; Sergey Kozlov; Igor Tolstunov
- Starring: Elena An; Danila Rassomakhin; Karim Pakachakov; Narinman Bekbulatov-Areshev; Anvar Khalilulaev
- Cinematography: Levan Kapanadze
- Edited by: Karolina Maciejewska
- Music by: Alexei Aigui
- Production companies: Igor Tolstunov Production Company (PROFIT), Drug Druga
- Release date: 18 September 2014 (Russia)
- Running time: 96 minutes
- Country: Russia
- Language: no dialog

Test (Russian: Испытание) is a 2014 Russian film about a doomed love triangle, set in 1949 on the prairie of the Kazakh Soviet Socialist Republic in present-day Kazakhstan, near the Semipalatinsk nuclear test site. The film does not have dialogue. The main character, Dina, lives with her father Tolgat on a serene farm that is near a nuclear test site. Dina is gentle, has a strong attachment to nature, and loves art. She loves to scrapbook and collage with the leaves and sticks. In one of her scrapbooks she creates a plane flying away representing her dream to one day travel and escape the isolation she feels in the remote farmland. "Unspecified in the movie itself, the geographical setting can be deduced as somewhere near Semey in modern-day Kazakhstan, then known as Semipalatinsk — notorious as the site of the USSR’s first nuclear test, in August 1949."

== Background ==
During the time period of 1949 and 1989, Semipalatinsk was used as a testing site for the Soviet Union conducting 456 nuclear tests. One of the first weapons tests took place at this testing site in 1949. A Limited Test Treaty Ban was put into effect in 1963 allowing the use of underground bombing despite the ban on nuclear testing in the atmosphere or in an environment that will possibly lead to radiation.

== Plot, Characters, and Themes ==
Dina, a poor farm girl, lives with her father on a remote farm in the middle of present day Kazakhstan but was a part of the Soviet Union when the movie took place in 1949. Tolgat, Dina's father, is a farmer and used to fly planes. While never stated, it is assumed Tolgat fought in World War II. Both Dina and Tolgat show little emotion throughout the film. They have experienced trauma and the isolation is brutal. Latest times Tolgat often comes home with such intense burns that he is unable to walk. It's not explicitly stated but it's very probably radiation burn. Especially because last time he delivered on the track and dies shortly probably from acute radiation syndrome.

Dina also has two love interests. Kaisyn is a local who comes from a similar background to Dina. His relationship with her shows more of a passionate and intense intimacy, while her second love interest with Max represents a more goofy and lighthearted love. Being blue eyed and Caucasian, he is clearly not from the same area of the Soviet Union and ultimately ends up with Dina in the ends of the movie when a nuclear bomb explodes wiping out Dina's home and everything with it.

There are many themes that are used in this film in order to implicitly show Dina's emotions. One of these themes is nature and her strong attachment to it. Dina is one with nature as a result of her extreme isolation. The vast farm land of nothingness adds to the feeling of isolation. There is a lack of infrastructure and people, preventing any real interaction with the world besides the characters present in the film. This minimal interaction presented creates more of an urge for Dina's dreams of leaving. She uses it in her artwork to represent her future ambitions of escaping the area she lives in. Her artwork is also an indication of the creativity she develops, as she uses the elements of nature in her work to present to viewers her feelings of wanting more without directly speaking on her emotions. Another theme is "actions speak louder than words", as cliché as it sounds.

The element of no dialogue drastically adds to the feeling of isolation because viewers are solely left to observe the scenery, objects, and the action of characters. There are many opportunities for viewers to ponder and contemplate on the characters' actions and emotions since there are no conversations. With the absence of dialogue, there is additional work done with the framing distance, lighting, color, camera angles, and editing to assure that viewers think critically about how its mise en scène contributes to telling the story of the film without words adding to the story. Overall, no dialogue adds to the element of loneliness and detachment that may reflect the emptiness of this time period. Another theme is her ambition to travel. There is a large World map in her room that she often gazes at. Dina additionally includes Indian dancing rituals and exotic fish in the collages she makes. Tolgat is also a pilot, so it seems as though travel should be more accessible, which makes her longing to escape more drastic.

== Cast ==
- Elena An as Dina
- Danila Rassomakhin as Max
- Karim Pakachakov as Tolgat
- Narinman Bekbulatov-Areshev as Kaysin

== Reception ==
Neil Young of The Hollywood Reporter stated "Elevated by a luminous performance from newcomer Elena An and Levan Kapanadze's crisply poetic cinematography" along with Noémie Luciani's response that "Pictures and sounds are worth (nearly) a thousand words."

== Accolades ==
The film has won the following awards:

- Narrative Competition, Abu Dhabi Film Festival 2014
- Grand Prize of the Festival, Sochi Open Russian Film Festival 2014
- Best Artistic Contribution Award, Tokyo International Film Festival 2014
- Best International Feature, Golden Orange Film Festival 2014 (Turkey).

Awards	Year	Category	Results
Abu Dhabi Film Festival	2014	Special Jury Award	Won
Abu Dhabi Film Festival	2014	Best Narrative Feature	Nominee
Asia Pacific Screen Awards	2014	Achievement in Cinematography	Nominee
Nika Awards	2015	Best Music	Won
Nika Awards	2015	Best Film	Nominee
Nika Awards	2015	Best Cinematographer	Nominee
Nika Awards	2015	Best Sound	Nominee
Russian Guild of Cinematographers, Russia	2015	Best Cinematography in a Feature Film	Won
Russian Guild of Film Critics	2015	Best Composer	Won
Russian Guild of Film Critics	2015	Best Director	Nominee
Russian Guild of Film Critics	2015	Best Cinematographer	Nominee
Sakhalin International Film Festival	2014	Grand Prix	Nominee
Sochi Open Russian Film Festival	2014	Best Cinematographer	Won
Sochi Open Russian Film Festival	2014	Grand Prize of the Festival	Won
Sochi Open Russian Film Festival	2014	Prize of the Guild of Russian Film Scholars and Film Critics	Won
Tokyo International Film Festival	2014	Best Artistic Contribution	Won
Tokyo International Film Festival	2014	WOWOW Viewer's Choice Award	Won
Tokyo International Film Festival	2014	Tokyo Grand Prix	Nominee
Transylvania International Film Festival	2015	FIPRESCI Prize	Won
