= Stepnogorsk =

Town in Akmola Region, Kazakhstan

Stepnogorsk Степногорск
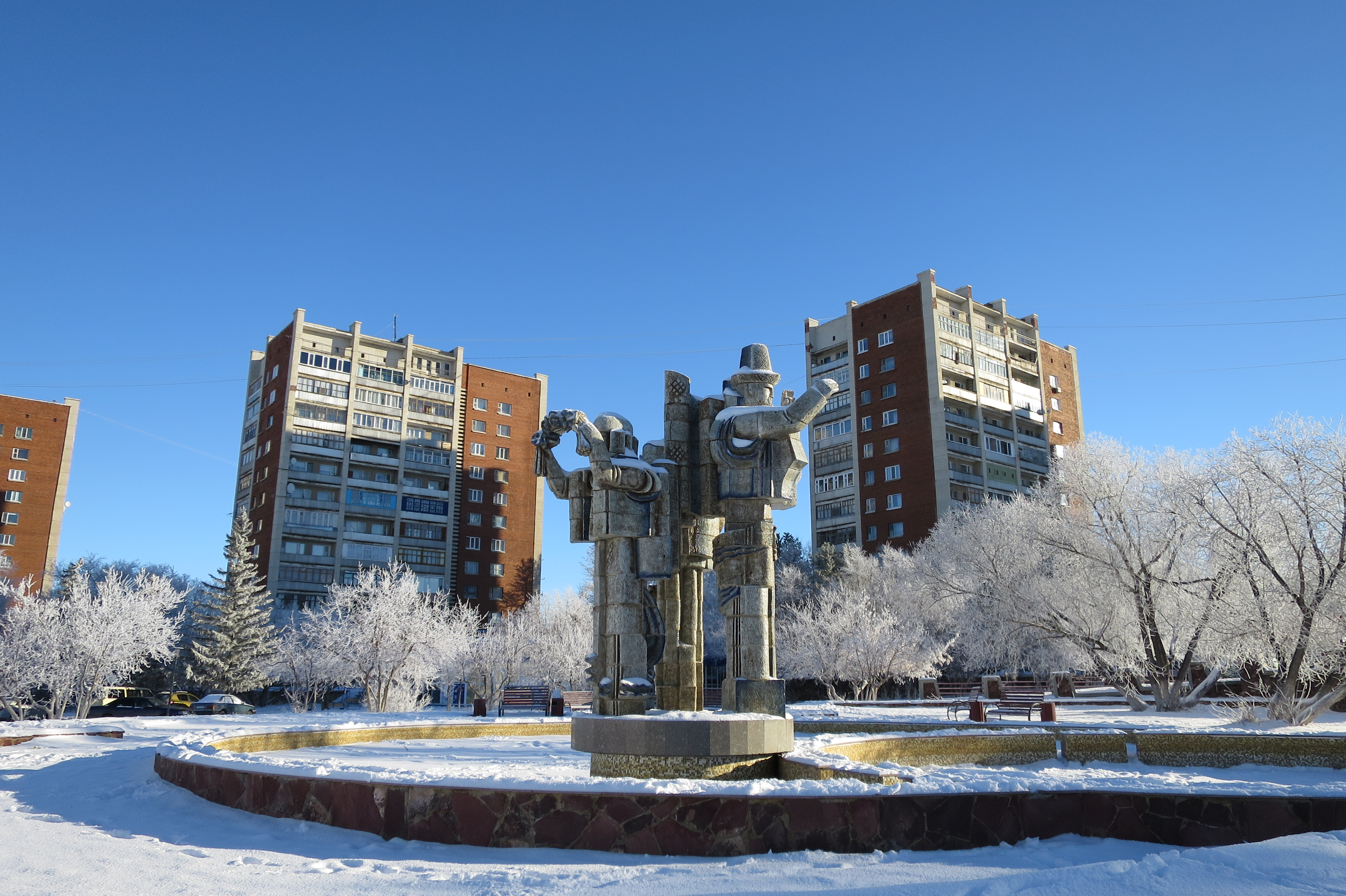

- Location in Kazakhstan
- Coordinates: 52°20′59″N 71°53′24″E
- Country: Kazakhstan
- Region: Akmola Region

Government
  - Type: Mayor-council government
  - Mayor: Gaidar Kassenov

Population (2009)
  - Total: 46,712
- Time zone: UTC+05:00 (Kazakhstan Time)

Stepnogorsk (Kazakh: Степногорск, romanized: Stepnogorsk; Russian: Степногорск) is a town in Akmola Region, Kazakhstan.

== History ==
Stepnogorsk was established in 1959, and has been a town since 1964. It began as a closed town with code names Tselinograd-25 (Russian: Целиноград-25), Makinsk-2 (Russian: Макинск-2). The town is known as a nuclear and biochemical site, which was known as the Stepnogorsk Scientific and Technical Institute for Microbiology.

== Demographics ==
As of 2023, the town’s urban population was estimated at 48,343. Historically, the 2009 census recorded 46,712 residents, and the 1999 census recorded 47,372.

== Climate ==
Stepnogorsk has a sharply continental, arid climate. Spring is typically dry and windy, with large swings between high daytime temperatures and below-freezing nights. In summer, mostly cloudless and hot conditions prevail, caused by intense warming of the steppe. A stable snow cover usually forms by mid-November and remains for 130–150 days, with an average depth of around 20–22 cm. Temperatures can drop below −25 °C for 10–14 days each January, occasionally lasting up to 20 days during severe winters. The coldest winter on record was 1976–1977 (down to −44.4 °C with high winds), and the strongest winds—28–34 m/s—occurred in winter 1995. Spring sets in during the second half of March and lasts 1.5–2 months, with daily highs typically reaching 0 °C in early April. The hottest recorded summer occurred in August 2002, when temperatures reached +44 °C. An aurora borealis was observed on 14 and 16 March 1989. According to local meteorological data from 2012–2019 (GISMETEO), the average annual temperature is about +4.6 °C.

Climate data for Stepnogorsk (2012–2019, GISMETEO)
Month	Jan	Feb	Mar	Apr	May	Jun	Jul	Aug	Sep	Oct	Nov	Dec	Year
Record high °C (°F)	1 (34)	5 (41)	9 (48)	27 (81)	31 (88)	33 (91)	35 (95)	36 (97)	33 (91)	23 (73)	11 (52)	1 (34)	36 (97)
Mean daily maximum °C (°F)	−2.9 (26.8)	−1.8 (28.8)	4.3 (39.7)	18.7 (65.7)	25.2 (77.4)	28.8 (83.8)	29.2 (84.6)	29.0 (84.2)	23.9 (75.0)	13.9 (57.0)	3.8 (38.8)	−1.5 (29.3)	14.2 (57.6)
Daily mean °C (°F)	−14.8 (5.4)	−12.6 (9.3)	−4.3 (24.3)	7.9 (46.2)	15.7 (60.3)	21.9 (71.4)	21.0 (69.8)	21.2 (70.2)	13.9 (57.0)	4.2 (39.6)	−5.7 (21.7)	−12.3 (9.9)	4.6 (40.3)
Mean daily minimum °C (°F)	−26.2 (−15.2)	−21.9 (−7.4)	−12.9 (8.8)	−3.1 (26.4)	5.8 (42.4)	13.0 (55.4)	10.8 (51.4)	11.4 (52.5)	5.2 (41.4)	−6 (21)	−17.5 (0.5)	−27.4 (−17.3)	−5.8 (21.6)
Record low °C (°F)	−38 (−36)	−33 (−27)	−20 (−4)	−8 (18)	1 (34)	8 (46)	10 (50)	7 (45)	1 (34)	−13 (9)	−29 (−20)	−38 (−36)	−38 (−36)
Average precipitation mm (inches)	16.9 (0.67)	13.8 (0.54)	13.4 (0.53)	19.7 (0.78)	34.3 (1.35)	42.2 (1.66)	56.3 (2.22)	42.8 (1.69)	25.0 (0.98)	29.5 (1.16)	22.0 (0.87)	16.6 (0.65)	332.5 (13.09)
Source: GISMETEO (2012–2019)
