= Stepnogorsk Scientific and Technical Institute for Microbiology =

Soviet biological warfare facility

- Stepnogorsk, Kazakhstan

Site information
- Type: Biological weapons research and production
- Controlled by: Soviet Union (1982–1991); Kazakhstan (1991–present)

Location
- Coordinates: 52°26′47″N 72°1′34″E

Site history
- Built: 1982
- In use: 1982–present

Garrison information
- Past commanders: Ken Alibek, Vladimir Bugreyev

The Stepnogorsk Scientific and Technical Institute for Microbiology, also known as the Scientific Experimental and Production Base, was one of the premier biological warfare facilities operated by the Soviet Union. It was the only Biopreparat facility to be built outside of Russia proper, and one of the few ever visited officially by Western experts. As of 1998 the site conducted civilian biological research overseen by director Vladimir Bugreyev. At the time the United States Department of State and the U.S. Civilian Research & Development Foundation provided significant funds supporting civilian research at Stepnogorsk.

== History ==
The facility was built in 1982, ten kilometers from Stepnogorsk, Kazakhstan, in the wake of the accident at Sverdlovsk. It was built to develop and produce large quantities of weaponized anthrax, almost 300 tons annually, in order to fill the production gap caused by a potential shutdown of their Sverdlovsk facility. Soviet leadership placed Colonel Kanatjan Alibekov (a.k.a. Ken Alibek) in charge of the base until his transfer to Moscow in 1987.

Following the dissolution of the Soviet Union in 1991, the Stepnogorsk base fell under the purview of the nascent Kazakh government, who, having little interest in weapons of mass destruction, let the secret city fall into disrepair.

Kazakh President Nursultan Nazarbayev personally granted a team of American experts, led by U.S. Department of Defense diplomat Andy Weber, permission to visit the still-operational site in 1995, the first time an American intelligence team had ever been allowed to do so.
