= Anti-nuclear movement in Kazakhstan =

Movement opposing nuclear weapons testing in Kazakhstan

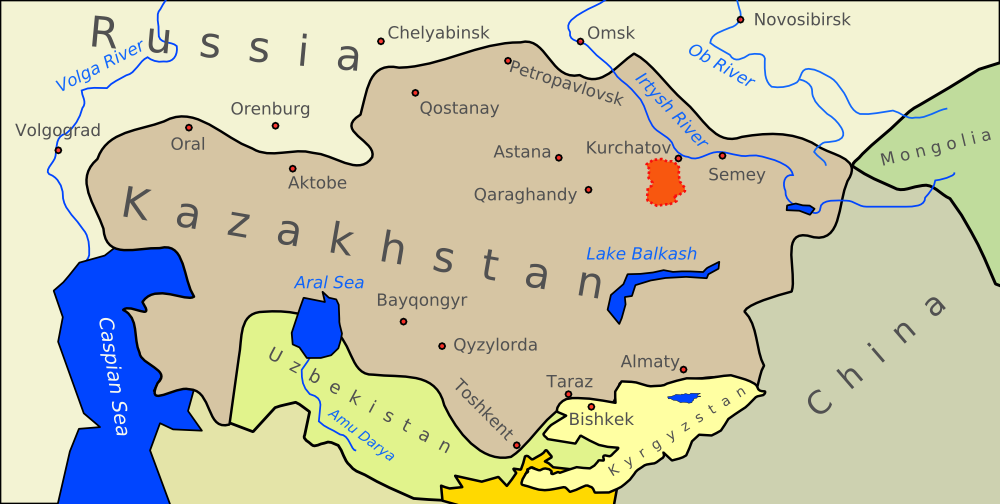
The 18,000 km^{2} expanse of the Semipalatinsk Test Site (indicated in red), attached to Kurchatov (along the Irtysh river). The site comprised an area the size of Wales.

The anti-nuclear movement in Kazakhstan, commonly known as Nevada-Semipalatinsk (Russian: Невада-Семипалатинск; Kazakh: Невада-Семей, romanized: Nevada-Semei), was formed in 1989 and was one of the first major anti-nuclear movements in the former Soviet Union. It was led by author Olzhas Suleimenov and attracted thousands of people to its protests and campaigns which eventually led to the closure of the Semipalatinsk Test Site in north-east Kazakhstan in 1991. The movement was named "Nevada Semipalatinsk" in order to show solidarity with similar movement in the west of the United States aiming to close the Nevada Test Site.

The Soviet Union conducted 456 nuclear weapons tests at the Semipalatinsk Test Site, between 1949 and 1989. The United Nations believes that one million people around Semey were exposed to radiation, and the incidence of birth defects and cancer is much higher than for the rest of the country.

According to UNESCO, Nevada-Semipalatinsk played a positive role in promoting public understanding of "the necessity to fight against nuclear threats". The movement gained global support and, became "a real historical factor in finding solutions to global ecological problems".

Astana hosted an international conference Building a Nuclear-Weapons-Free World in August 2016. The topics of the conference included nuclear non-proliferation and disarmament and the physical protection of nuclear weapons. The main outcome of the conference was the adoption of The Astana Vision Declaration “From a Radioactive Haze to a Nuclear-Weapon-Free World.”

== See also ==
- Semipalatinsk Test Site
- Downwinders
- Kazatomprom
- Energy policy of Kazakhstan
- List of anti-nuclear power groups
- List of books about nuclear issues
- List of Chernobyl-related articles
- List of nuclear whistleblowers
- List of Nuclear-Free Future Award recipients
