= Semipalatinsk Test Site =

Nuclear testing venue for the Soviet Union in northeast Kazakhstan

Semipalatinsk-21
- Near Kurchatov in Kazakhstan

Site information
- Type: Nuclear test site
- Operator: Soviet Union (1949–1989)
- Status: Inactive

Location
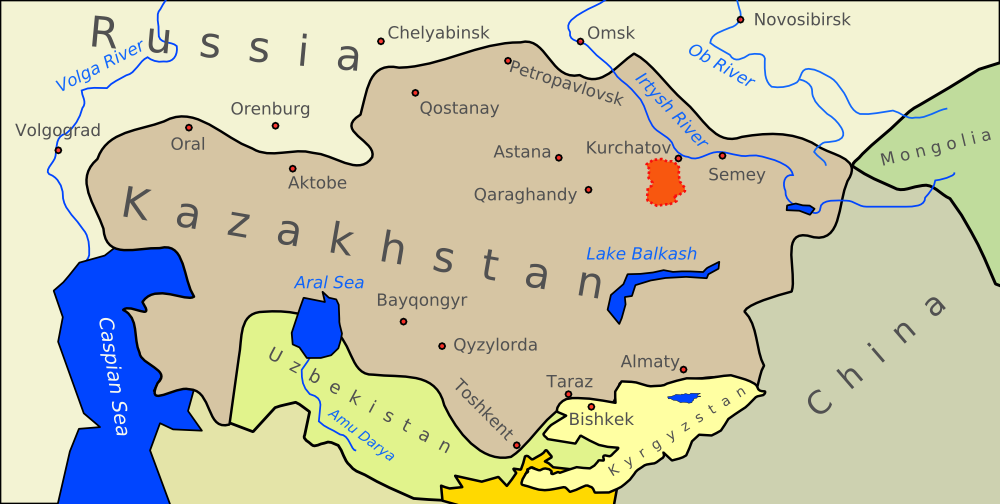
- The 18,000 km^{2} expanse of the Semipalatinsk Test Site (indicated in orange), attached to Kurchatov (along the Irtysh river), and near Semey, as well as Karagandy, and Astana. The site comprised an area the size of Wales.
- Coordinates: 50°07′N 78°43′E
- Area: 18,000 km^{2} (6,950 sq mi)

Site history
- In use: 1949 – 1991

Test information
- Subcritical tests: not known
- Nuclear tests: 468 nuclear tests Atmospheric: 125: Ground-based — 26; Airborne — 91; High-altitude — 8; Underground: 343: Adit tests — 215; Borehole tests — 128

The Semipalatinsk Test Site or Semipalatinsk-21 (Russian: Семипалатинск-21; Kazakh: Семей-21, romanized: Semei-21), also known as "The Polygon", was the primary testing venue for the Soviet Union's nuclear weapons. It is located in Zhanasemey District, Abai Region, Kazakhstan, south of the valley of the Irtysh River. The test site was part of the former Kazakh SSR. The scientific buildings for the test site were located around 150 km (93 mi) west of the town of Semipalatinsk, later renamed Semey, near the border of East Kazakhstan Region and Pavlodar Region. Most of the nuclear tests took place at various sites further to the west and the south, some as far as into Karagandy Region.

The Soviet Union conducted 468 nuclear tests at Semipalatinsk from 1949 until 1989 with little regard for their effect on the local people or environment. The full impact of radiation exposure was hidden for many years by Soviet authorities and has only come to light since the test site closed in 1991. According to estimates from Kazakh experts, 1.5 million people were exposed to fallout over the years.

From 1996 to 2012, a secret joint operation of Kazakh, Russian, and American nuclear scientists and engineers secured some waste plutonium in the tunnels of the mountains.

The Semipalatinsk Test Site saw the detonation of the first Soviet atom bomb and the first air-tested hydrogen bomb. Over the course of 40 years, a quarter of all nuclear tests in history took place here. Since its closure on 29 August 1991, the Semipalatinsk Test Site has become the best-researched nuclear testing site in the world, and the only one in the world open to the public year-round.

== History ==
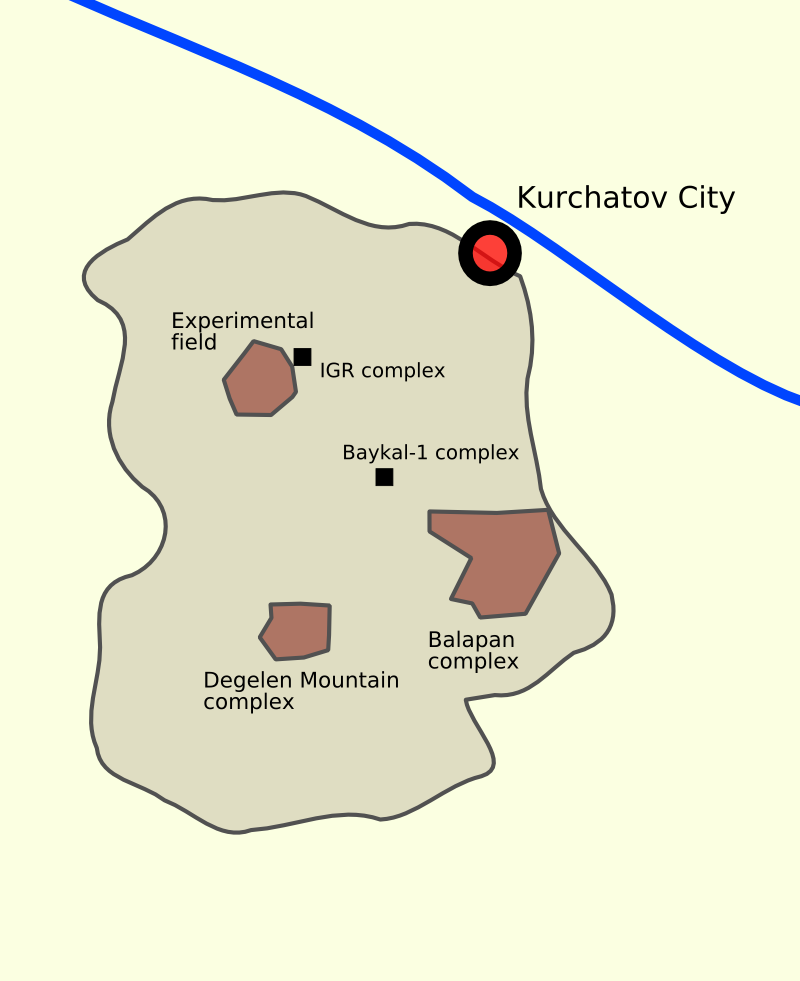
The various facilities grouped inside the Semipalatinsk Test Site

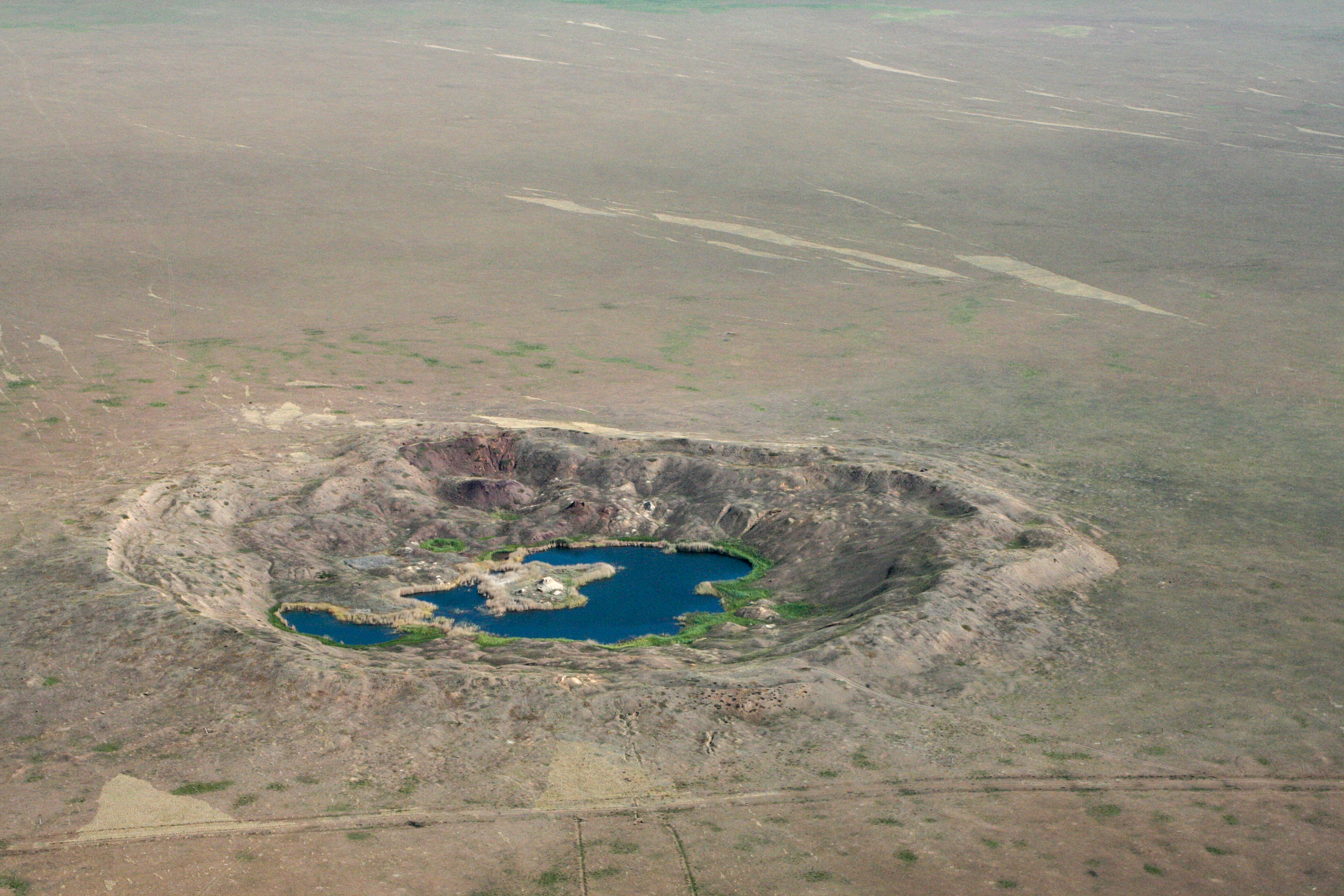
Crater from a nuclear test

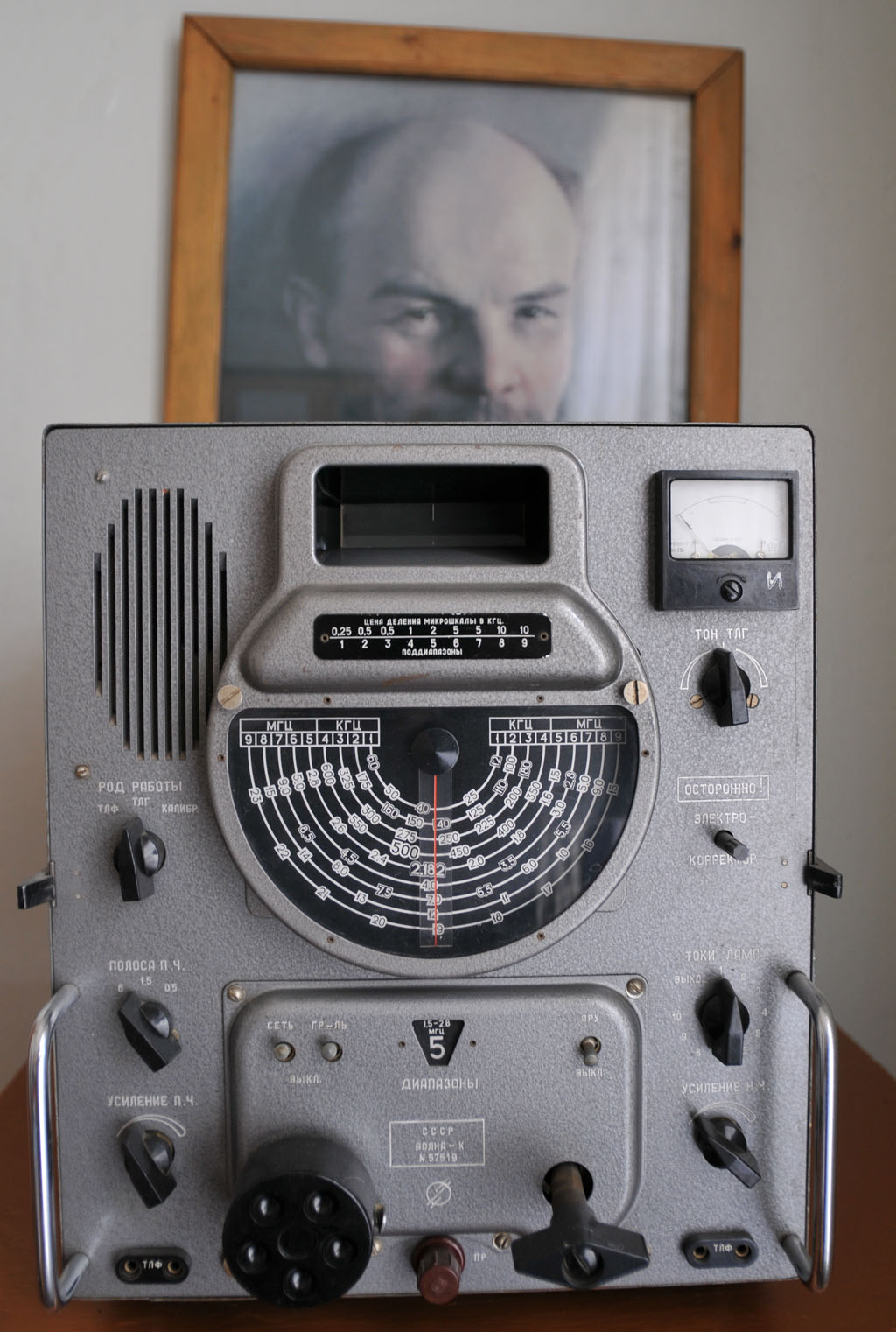
Igor Kurchatov's radio and a portrait of Vladimir Lenin, found at the old test site

The site was selected in 1947 by Lavrentiy Beria, political head of the Soviet atomic bomb project. Beria claimed the vast 18,000 km² steppe was "uninhabited". Gulag labour was employed to build the primitive test facilities, including the laboratory complex in the northeast corner on the southern bank of the Irtysh River. The first Soviet bomb test, Operation First Lightning, was conducted in 1949 from a tower at the Semipalatinsk Test Site, scattering fallout on nearby villages. The same area, "the experimental field", a region 64 km (40 mi) west of Kurchatov city, was used for more than 100 subsequent above-ground weapons tests.

Later tests were moved to the Balapan complex by the Chagan River in the southeast of the Semipalatinsk Polygon, including the site of the Chagan test, which formed Chagan Lake. Once atmospheric tests were banned, testing was transferred to underground locations at Saryozen, Murzhik in the west, and at the Degelen mountain complex in the south, which is riddled with boreholes and drifts for both subcritical and supercritical tests. After the closure of the Semipalatinsk labour camp, construction duties were performed by the 217th Separate Engineering and Mining Battalion, who later built the Baikonur Cosmodrome.

Between 1949 and the cessation of atomic testing in 1989, 456 explosions were conducted at the STS, including 340 underground borehole and tunnel shots and 116 atmospheric, either air-drop or tower shots. The lab complex, still the administrative and scientific centre of the STS, was renamed Kurchatov City after Igor Kurchatov, leader of the initial Soviet nuclear programme. The location of Kurchatov city has been typically shown on various maps as "Konechnaya", the name of the train station, now Degelen, or "Moldary", the name of the village that was later incorporated into the city.

The Semipalatinsk Complex was of acute interest to foreign governments during its operation, particularly during the phase when explosions were carried out above ground at the experimental field. Several U-2 overflights examined preparations and weapons effects, before being replaced with satellite reconnaissance. The US Defense Intelligence Agency who were spying on the Soviet Union, believed that the Soviets established an enormous beam weapon station at a small research station located on the testing site.

This smaller research station, known to the Department of Defense as PNUTS (Possible Nuclear Underground Test Site) and to the CIA as URDF-3 (Unidentified Research and Development Facility-3) was of great interest to American intelligence agencies. After the fall of the Soviet Union in 1991, it was discovered that the mysterious URDF-3 was tasked with researching a nuclear thermal rocket similar to the US's NERVA.

=== Closure of the test site ===
Information about the test site was first made public during the Glasnost era. Before this, even the First Secretary of the Central Committee of the Communist Party of Kazakhstan had neither access to the site nor any authority over its operations. According to Nazarbayev, then Chairman of the Council of Ministers of the Kazakh SSR, a few months after the Chernobyl disaster, Moscow sent an order to expand the territory of the Semipalatinsk site into the Taldy-Kurgan Region. Nazarbayev refused to sign the document, summoning Taldy-Kurgan’s regional executive committee chair, Seilbek Shaumakhanov, to Alma-Ata and instructing him to spread the word about the expansion plan and to hold a protest rally with an “unexpectedly assembled” public. A significant role was also played by Keshirim Boztaev, the First Secretary of the Semipalatinsk Regional Committee of the Communist Party of Kazakhstan, who, with the approval of the republican leadership, sent a telegram on February 20, 1989, to the CPSU Central Committee, addressed to M. S. Gorbachev, requesting that “relevant ministries and agencies be instructed to temporarily suspend or drastically reduce the frequency and power of explosions and, in the future, move nuclear testing to another, more acceptable location.” Meanwhile, the KGB reported to Moscow that protest sentiments were intensifying and warned of a possible repeat of the December 1986 events in Alma-Ata, but on a republic-wide scale. Ultimately, the decision was made to abandon the site expansion plan.

On May 30, 1989, Nazarbayev addressed the Supreme Soviet of the Soviet Union:

I want to especially highlight the Semipalatinsk Nuclear Test Site, which has been active since 1949 and initially conducted atmospheric tests. The population around it has quadrupled since then. But the military is almost trying to convince us that these tests are beneficial to human health. We understand the necessity for the state, but there must be a thorough analysis of the environmental impact of atomic explosions, and this information should be shared with the people.

In 1989, the prominent Kazakh activist Olzhas Suleimenov founded the Nevada-Semipalatinsk movement, uniting victims of nuclear testing worldwide. One of the movement’s most significant events was a mass rally held in the village of Karaaul in the Abay district.

The last explosion at the site was conducted on October 19, 1989.

One of Nazarbayev’s first decisions as president of the Kazakh SSR was to close the Semipalatinsk Test Site and to fully renounce the world’s fourth-largest nuclear arsenal. On August 29, 1991, the Kazakh SSR government closed the site. On that day, Nazarbayev announced a special parliamentary session to discuss the site’s closure without the Soviet leadership’s consent. The session began in the morning and concluded in the evening. By the end, some deputies and officials from the Semipalatinsk Region requested additional tests to secure the informal compensation promised by Moscow. In his closing statement, the president assumed responsibility and, exercising his authority, signed the decree to close the site on the spot.

=== Legacy ===
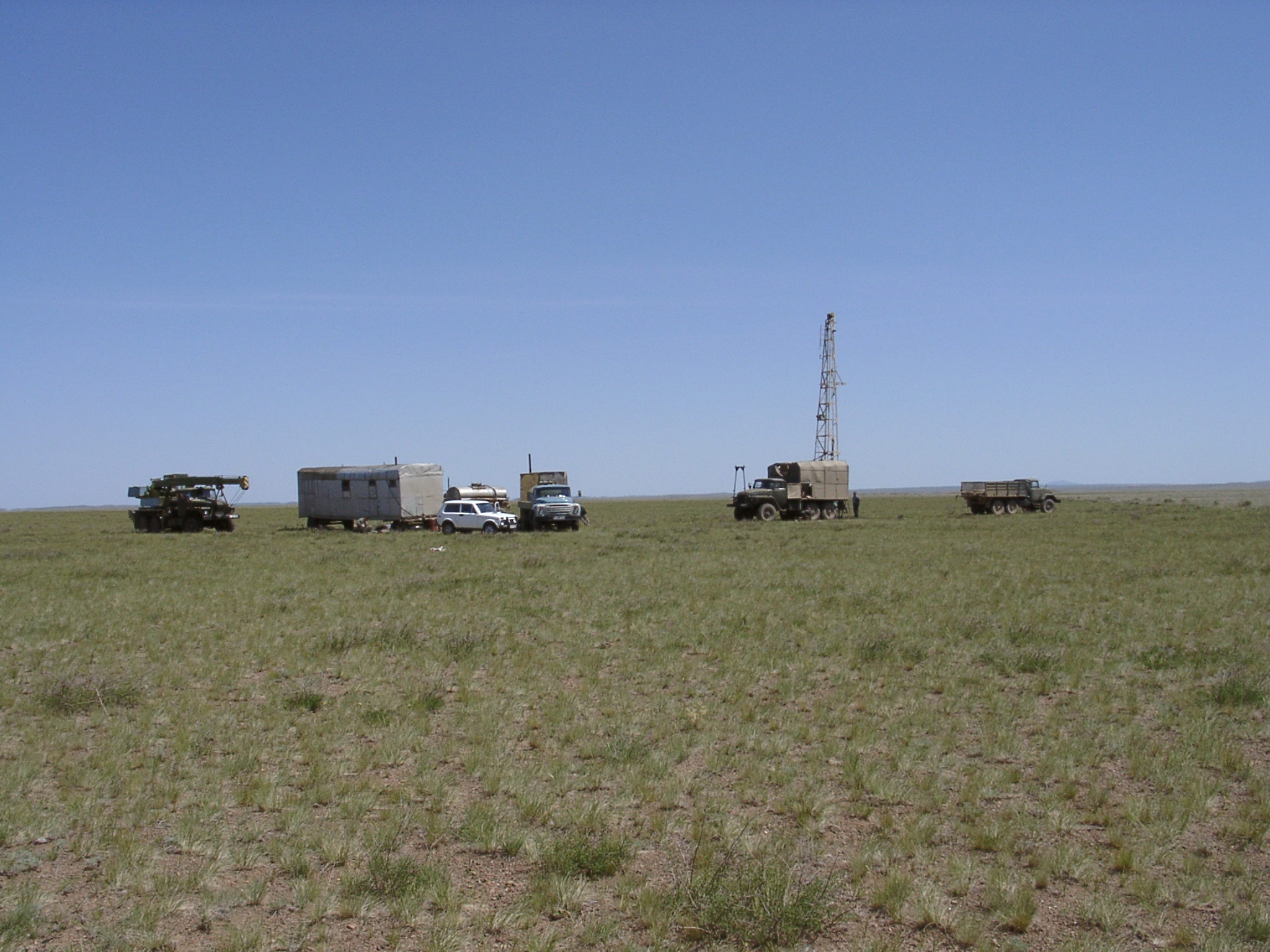
Drilling tower in the Semipalatinsk test site, 2003

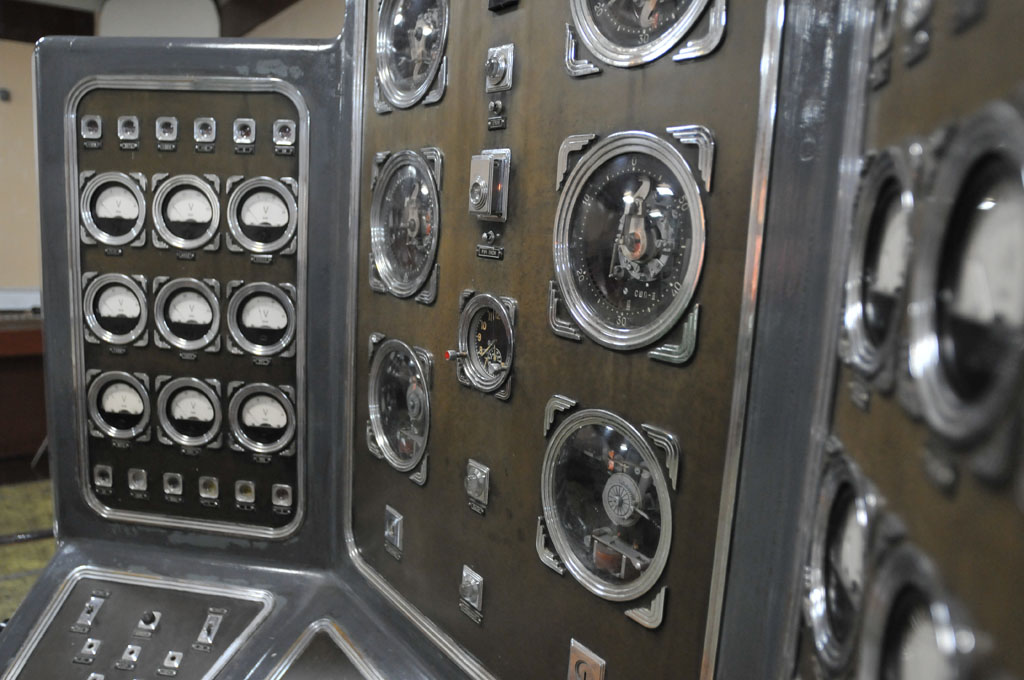
Console from the old Soviet test site

The Soviet government conducted its last tests in 1989. After the Soviet Union collapsed in 1991, the site was neglected. Fissile material was left behind in mountain tunnels and bore holes, virtually unguarded and vulnerable to scavengers, rogue states, or potential terrorists. The secret cleanup of Semipalatinsk was made public in the 2010s.

After some of the tests, radioactive material remained on the now abandoned area, including significant amounts of plutonium. The risk that material might fall into the hands of scavengers or terrorists was considered one of the largest nuclear security threats since the collapse of the Soviet Union. The operation to address the problem involved, in part, pouring special concrete into test holes, to bind the waste plutonium. In other cases, horizontal mine test holes were sealed and the entrances covered over. In October 2012, Kazakh, Russian, and American nuclear scientists and engineers celebrated the completion of a secret 17-year, $150 million operation to secure the plutonium in the tunnels of the mountains.

Large parts of the STS have opened up since 2014, and economic activity has resumed: mostly mining, but also agriculture and tourism. As with other areas affected by radioactivity, the lack of human interference has made the STS a haven for wildlife.

Residents of the test site's surrounding area in the Kazakh Steppe have been affected by the radiation and have suffered from radiation caused illnesses just as other surrounding areas have. However, unlike other communities, some Kazakhs have formed an identity around this fact. Some have even considered themselves to be a new breed of human. As they understand it, they are mutants who have grown and adapted to the radiation present in their home. According to unconfirmed sources detailing the residents' opinion, the air and the food are toxic, and the people consume this and live. They believe they must be adapting to the radiation and that is why people only get a 'little sick'. They have even begun to believe that they are so used to radiation that their bodies require it. This belief has stemmed from the fact that many individuals who left in favour of opportunities in cities have died soon after. Although the evidence villagers cite is anecdotal, and most of the deaths were as a result of alcoholism, overdose, and other challenges that arose after a failure to adapt to a new way of life, to some left behind, it seems that the lack of radiation killed them. This has further cemented their belief that they are 'radioactive mutants'.

The locals also believe that their status is backed by science. The basis of this was a training exercise performed by the Comprehensive Test-Ban-Treaty Organization (CTBTO). The exercise was based around a hypothetical nuclear explosion, so CTBTO participants wore full protective gear during the exercise. Citizens of a nearby village witnessed this but were neither informed of the 'exercise' nor the reason for the outsiders' presence. As such the citizens perceived strangers having to wear protective gear to enter the area around their community while they, the residents, had no need. This further cemented their belief that they must be radioactive mutants.

== Anti-nuclear movement ==
The anti-nuclear movement in Kazakhstan, named Nevada-Semipalatinsk, was formed in 1989 and was one of the first major anti-nuclear movements in the former Soviet Union. It was led by author Olzhas Suleimenov and attracted thousands of people to its protests and campaigns which eventually led to the closure of the nuclear test site at Semipalatinsk in 1991.

According to UNESCO, Nevada-Semipalatinsk played a positive role in promoting public understanding of "the necessity to fight against nuclear threats". The movement gained global support and became "a real historical factor in finding solutions to global ecological problems".

== Health impacts ==
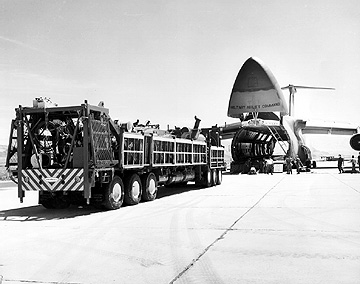
A 55-ton Cardwell drill rig being loaded onto a USAF C-5 Galaxy aircraft for shipment to Semipalatinsk in support of the Joint Verification Experiment, 1988

Studies conducted by scientists from Berlin and Kurchatov took blood samples from forty different families who lived in a district of Kazakhstan that were directly exposed at high levels to fallout from the Soviet bomb tests. These studies concluded that individuals who had been exposed to the fallout between 1949 and 1956 had an approximate 80% increase of mutations in the minisatellite regions of their DNA. The children of these individuals had 50% more mutations in their minisatellite regions compared to their control counterparts.

Some health scientists are still not sure what the germline mutations mean for the individuals' health, but there is increasing evidence these mutations may increase genetic predisposition to certain diseases, such as cardiovascular diseases. There has also been evidence that increased levels of DNA mutation rates are correlated with prolonged radiation exposure.

A longitudinal study conducted over a 40-year span found a correlation between radiation fallout exposure and prevalence of solid tumors. The most frequent sites for solid tumors were the esophagus, stomach, lungs, breasts, and liver. These sites were found to have statistically significant increases in prevalence when compared to a control group. However some bodily sites had no significant difference in number: cervix uteri, kidney, rectum, and pancreas. The study's data suggests that there is a link between exposure length, and amount, to overall and cancer mortality. Nonetheless the relationship between the level of radiation exposure and effect is still up for discussion.

The full impact of radiation exposure was hidden for many years by Soviet authorities. The general consensus of health studies conducted at the site since it was closed is that radioactive fallout from nuclear testing had a direct impact on the health of about 200,000 local residents. Specifically, scientists have linked higher rates of different types of cancer to post-irradiation effects. Likewise, several studies have explored the correlation between radiation exposure and thyroid abnormalities. A BBC programme claimed in 2010 that in the worst affected locations one in twenty children born were with genetic defects. British film-maker Antony Butts documented some of the genetic health impacts in his 2010 film After the Apocalypse.

A recently declassified CIA report provides a first-hand witness account of the immediate impacts of a nuclear test near Semipalatinsk in 1955. In this report, a source who was in the vicinity of a Soviet thermonuclear test in November 1955 describes experiencing loss of hearing, "the air... crackling up with pressure" as if the "air was tearing up", and the ground shaking.

Ethnographic data from anthropological study detail some of the unique perspectives of those populations that are affected and still live within the area of radiation exposure that allow those populations to understand their circumstances and the biological subjectivity of concepts like safety and their survival within an area still affected by radiation.

The nation of Kazakhstan recognizes more than a million of their citizens as victims of Soviet-era radiation exposure. In one village adjacent to the test site, categorized as "minimal risk", the Kazakh government allots each resident a one time lump sum roughly equivalent to $50 USD.

=== Perception of adaptation to radiation ===
Although there are clear biological impacts of the radiation exposure, the surrounding communities rarely have a sense of nuclear victimization. Although their health is negatively impacted by the radiation, residents see themselves as resilient. Many believe that they have genetically adapted to survive the radiation and report that they have come to rely upon it. One villager claimed that "Our organism is different... now accustomed to radiation. For many years we were exposed to radioactive fallout, and now we eat it. Slowly and quietly, our bodies got used to it. Why do you think people don't die [here], but only get a little sick?... Most of us can't live in clean air—we need radiation to survive. Clean air is our death. We are not deformed, just a little sick." In the same manner, many within the village self-report that when they venture outside the area for supplies, they suffer symptoms such as headaches, dizziness, and stomach cramps, furthering the thought that they have come to rely on the radiation to live. Overall, residents have embraced the radiation as a sign of their own genetic adaptation.

According to fieldwork in Koyan, with a population of 50, Koyaners have high rates of "anemia, cancer, hypertension, headaches, skin rashes, and bone pain" along with self-reported hair loss, nosebleeds, and cataracts. While unhealthy, Stawkowski noted that there was an absence of "serious and life-threatening deformities" that are portrayed, in media and by doctors, to be prevalent in people exposed to long-term and low-dose radiation. Examples of the mutations that could be found in Koyaners included "a man born with webbed feet, a woman with one slightly short thumb, and several people living with vitiligo" The nature of these mutations, coupled with the fact that villagers experienced aggravated symptoms upon leaving Koyan, Koyaners insist that they have biologically adapted to and subsequently rely on the radiation. To Koyaners, the prevalence of maladapted animals emphasized their resilience and further proved the success of their own adaptations. As one Koyaner said, "the radiation exposure made everyone 'a little sick', ... but they have survived and live long lives."

== Site of the signing of the Central Asian Nuclear Weapon Free Zone treaty ==
Semipalatinsk was the site that Kazakhstan, Kyrgyzstan, Tajikistan, Turkmenistan, and Uzbekistan chose for the signing of the Central Asian Nuclear Weapon Free Zone on 8 September 2006, also commemorating the 15th anniversary of the test site's closing.

== In popular culture ==
The 2014 Russian film Test is a fictionalized account of the first Soviet nuclear test from the perspective of some of the local inhabitants.

The Dead Lake by Hamid Ismailov explores the effects of the nuclear tests on Kazakhs.

We Live Here is a 2025 Kazakh documentary film about Semipalatinsk and the people who live near to it.

== See also ==
- Anti-nuclear movement in Kazakhstan
- Aral Sea disaster
- List of nuclear reactors
- List of nuclear tests
- List of nuclear weapons tests of the Soviet Union
- Lists of nuclear disasters and radioactive incidents
- Nevada Test Site
- Novaya Zemlya Test Site
- Nuclear energy in Kazakhstan
- Operation Plumbbob
- Struan Stevenson
- Totskoye nuclear exercise
- Ulba Metallurgical Plant
