= Kurchatov, Kazakhstan =

Kurchatov Курчатов
- Seal

- Location in Kazakhstan
- Coordinates: 50°45′24″N 78°32′24″E
- Country: Kazakhstan
- Region: Abai Region
- Founded: 1947
- Incorporated (city): 1948

Government
  - Akim (mayor): Abdraliev Bolat

Area
  - Total: 16 km^{2} (6.2 sq mi)
- Website: http://kurchatov.vko.gov.kz/

Kurchatov (in Kazakh and Russian: Курча́тов) is a town in Abai Region in north-east Kazakhstan. Named after Soviet nuclear physicist Igor Kurchatov, the town was once the centre of operations for the adjoining Semipalatinsk Test Site. With the cessation of nuclear testing and the decommissioning of the test site, Kurchatov's population has fallen from over 20,000 to around 8,000. In its heyday, Kurchatov (which was known by its postal code Semipalatinsk-21) was a closed city, one of the most secretive and restricted places in the Soviet Union. The nuclear facilities at Kurchatov are managed by the Kazakhstan Institute of Atomic Energy, a division of the country's National Nuclear Center.

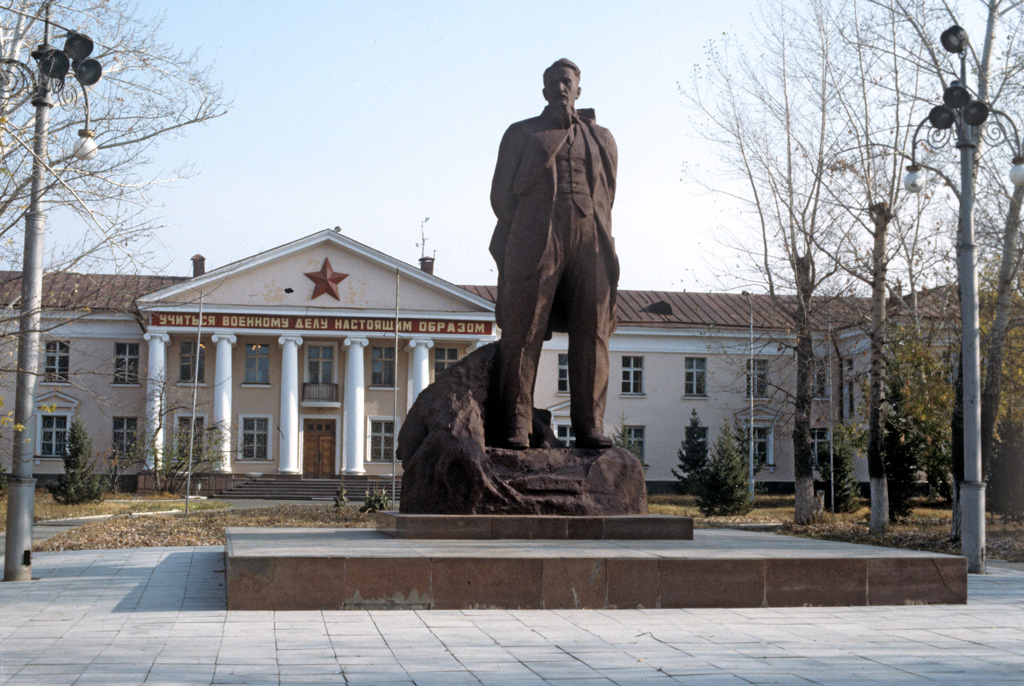
A monument to Kurchatov on the background of the Semipalatinsk nuclear test site's Central Staff, 1991. Now it is the Town Administration building

== Geography ==
Kurchatov is located on the south bank of the Irtysh River, which crosses into Kazakhstan from the autonomous region of Xinjiang in China approximately 400 kilometres (250 mi) to the southeast.

== Infrastructure ==
A railway connects Kurchatov to Pavlodar and Astana to the west and to Semey 130 kilometres (100 mi) to the east.

== Effects of radiation ==
Kurchatov residents were exposed to radiation from the Semipalatinsk Test Site, also known as the Polygon to locals. One village, located in the radius of three underground atomic test bomb craters, was deemed to belong to a “minimal risk category” and residents are entitled to a one-time, lump-sum payment equalling about $50.

People in the Kurchatov region experience a variety of adverse health effects, though this has not been definitively linked to the radiation exposure due the “toxic layering” of numerous factors, such as inadequate nutrition, poor water quality, and unsanitary living conditions. The chronic ailments and diseases suffered by Kurchatov residents may be the result of radiation exposure, but the decades-long latency period from exposure to symptom makes it difficult to determine whether radiation or some other cause is at fault.

As a result of the secrecy surrounding the Soviet atomic project, researchers were prevented from discussing radiation exposure and conducting public safety risk assessments. Soviet scientists were unable to track the types and amounts of radioisotopes released into the environment, unlike their US counterparts who were able to track radioisotopes and link them to quantifiable and singular physical effects, such as thyroid cancer. Chronic radiation syndrome (CRS) exists as a result of Soviet researchers’ linkage of concurrent symptoms, such as anemia, chronic fatigue, joint pain, nosebleeds, and brittle bones, to biological changes.

The National Research Council in 2006 concluded that lose-dose radiation and illness cannot be clearly linked, and despite the possible dangers, there is no evidence that exposure to it causes disorders like birth defects, chromosomal aberrations, or any other cellular abnormalities among adult populations. The NRC also concluded that genetic damage caused by radiation cannot be passed on to offspring. This research is grounded in longitudinal studies of atomic-bomb survivors from Hiroshima and Nagasaki. Other research studies, such as Dubrova et al 1996, find that radiation can cause serious mutations in the germ line even in low doses and that somatic mutations are transmittable to offspring.

== Citizens and “radioactive mutants” ==
According to Magdalena Stawkowski, the citizens of Kurchatov have a unique way of viewing themselves. Instead of believing they are victims of the radiation in the area, they consider themselves "radioactive mutants." They see the effects of the radiation as a “locally specific form of adaptation” and believe that any citizens who move out of the area die due to no longer being in an irradiated environment. While they embrace their radiation exposure, they also acknowledge the chronic ailments it has caused such as rashes, high blood pressure, heart problems, and cancers. However, they believe the radiation is keeping them alive and that clean air would actually kill them which is why so few leave the area. Despite the many ailments the people of Kurchatov have suffered through, they reject the idea that they are victims.
